= Trujillo, Peru =

Trujillo
- City
- Trujillo de Nueva Castilla
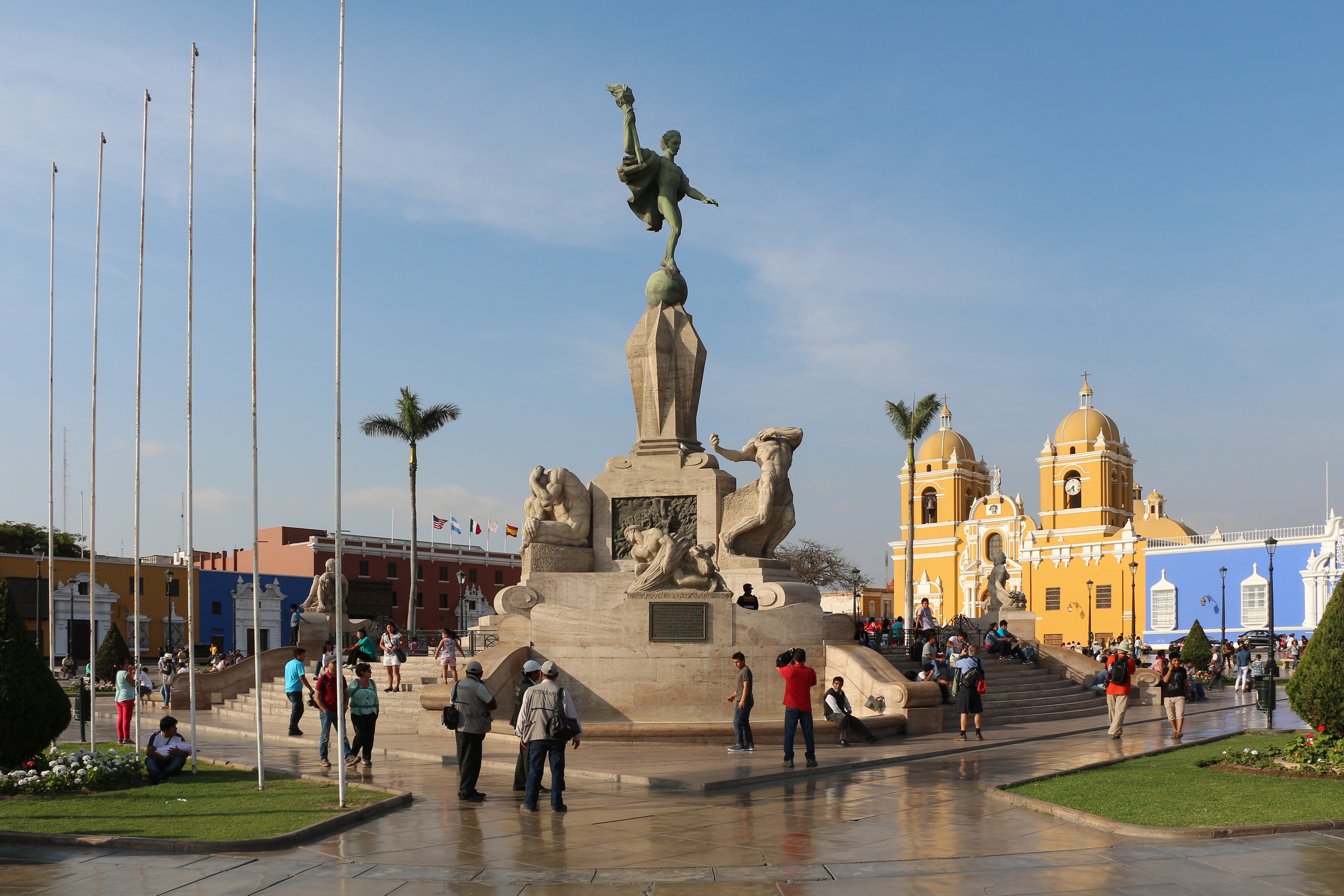
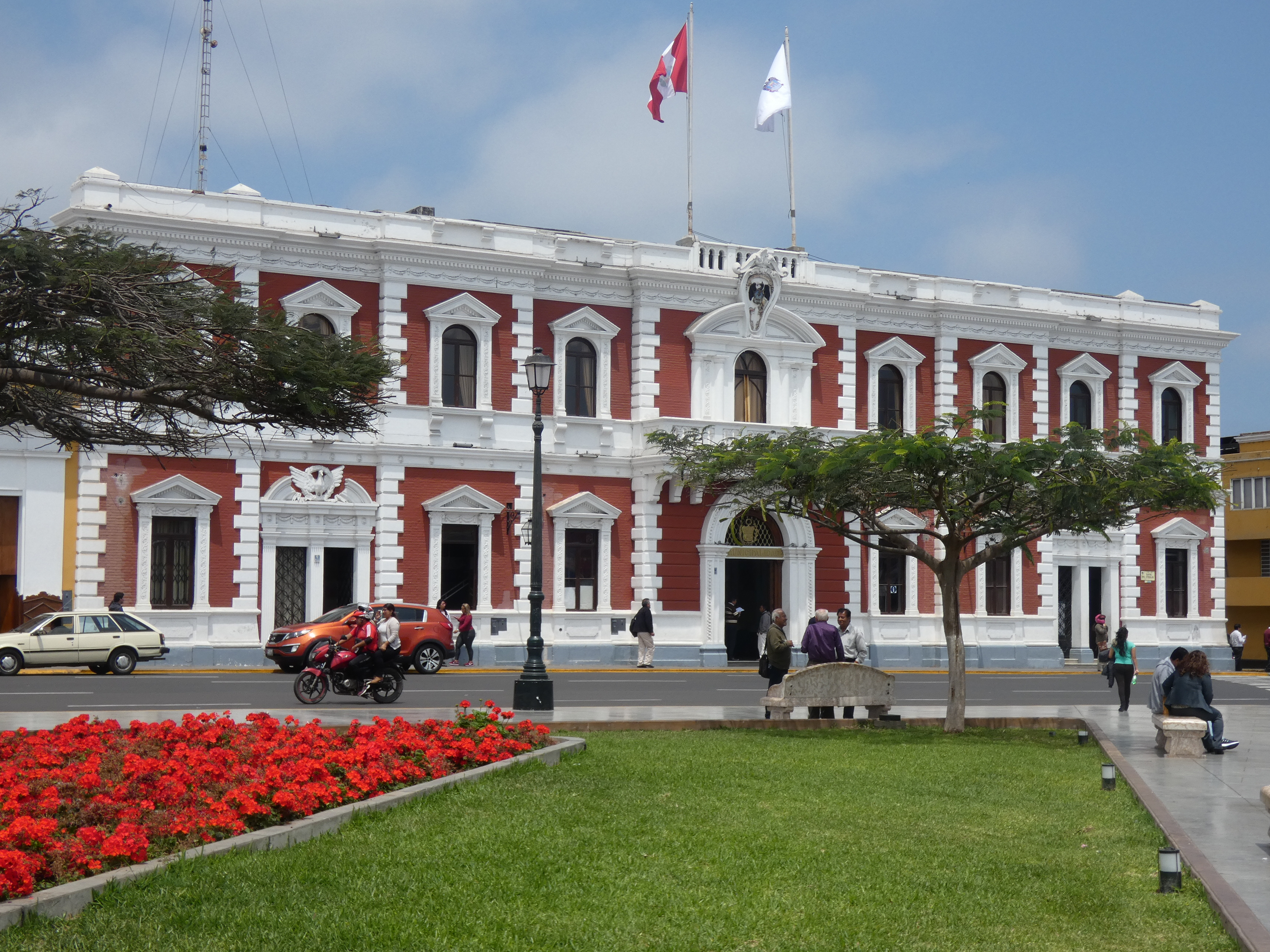
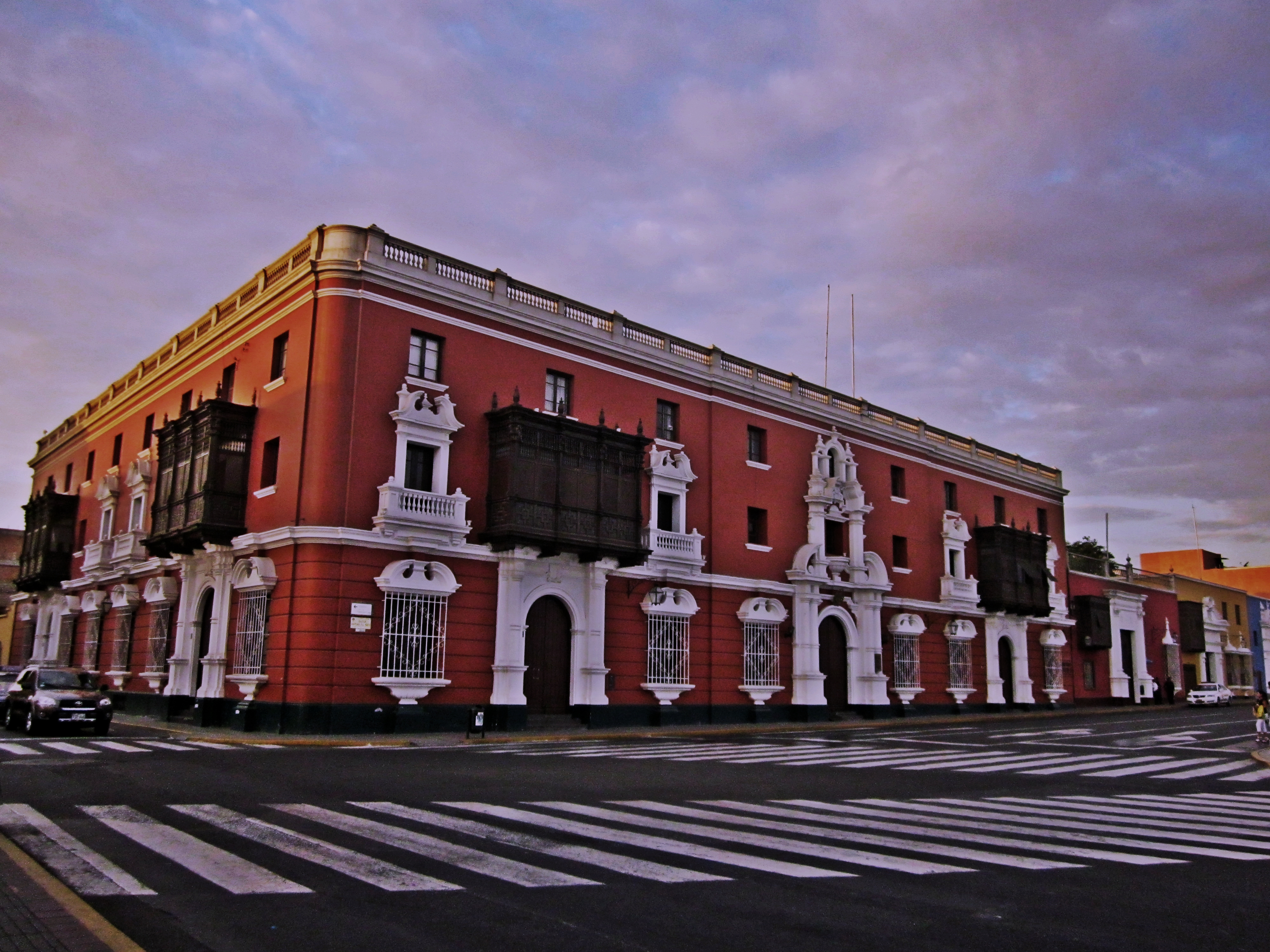
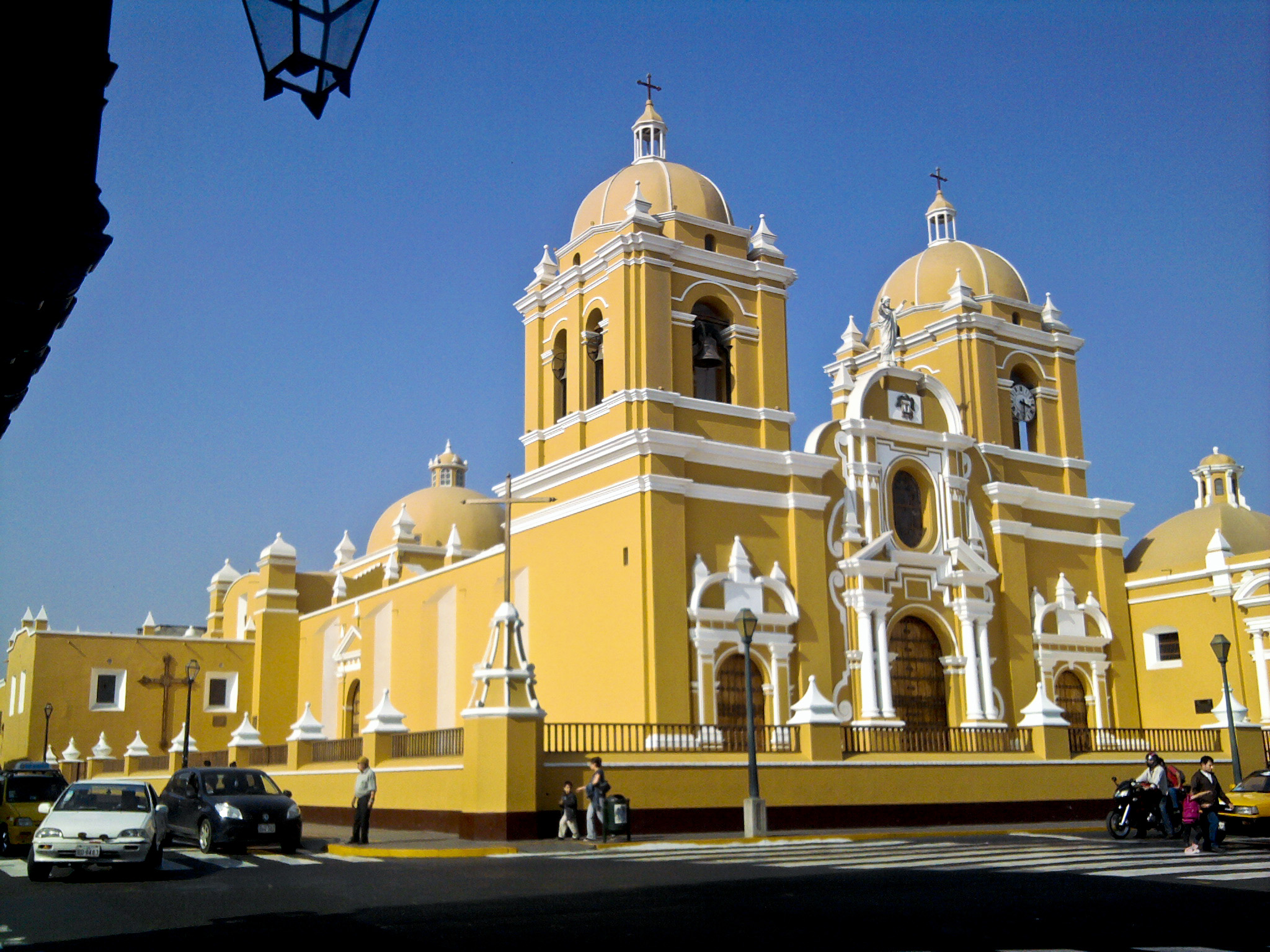
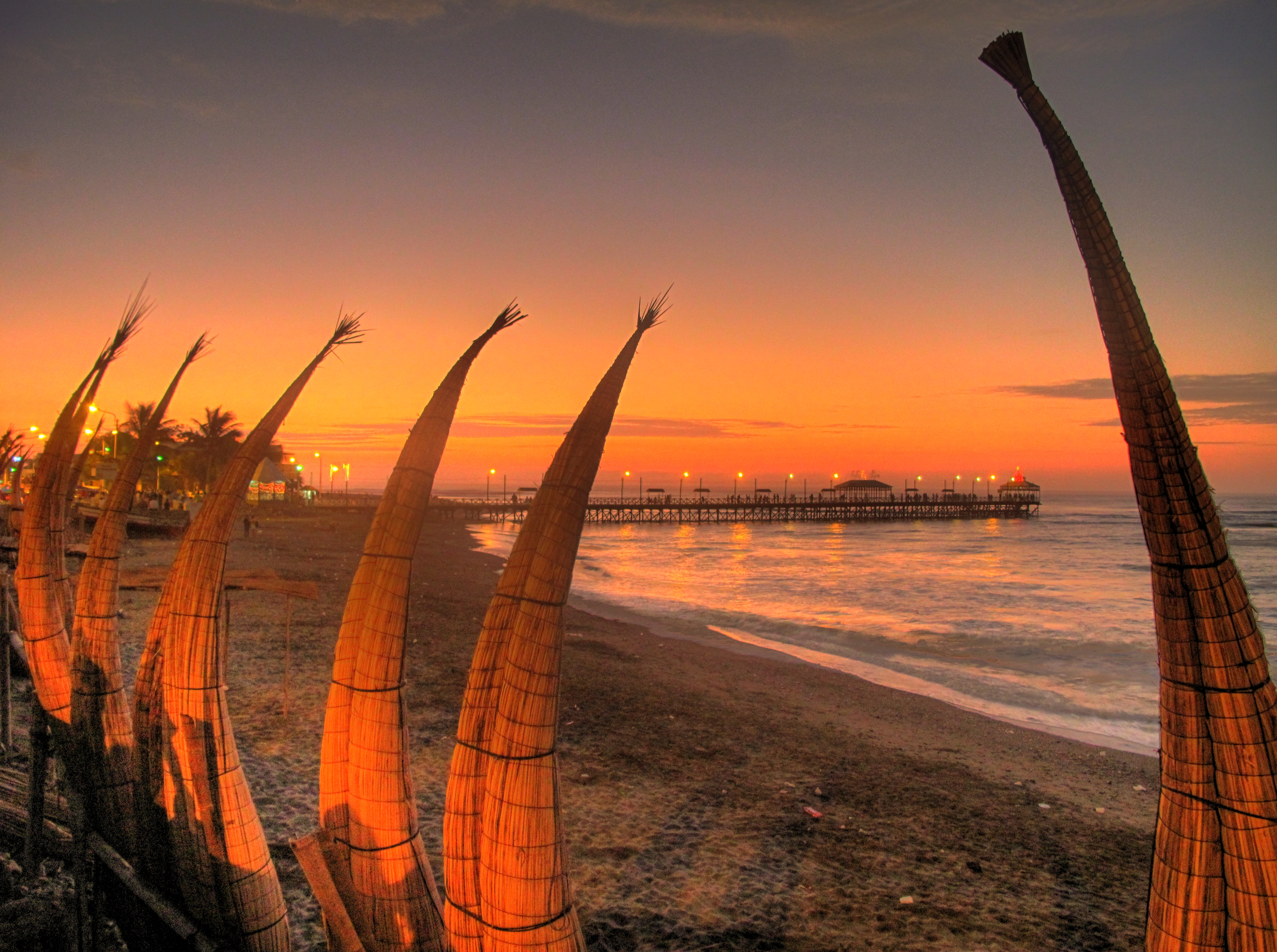
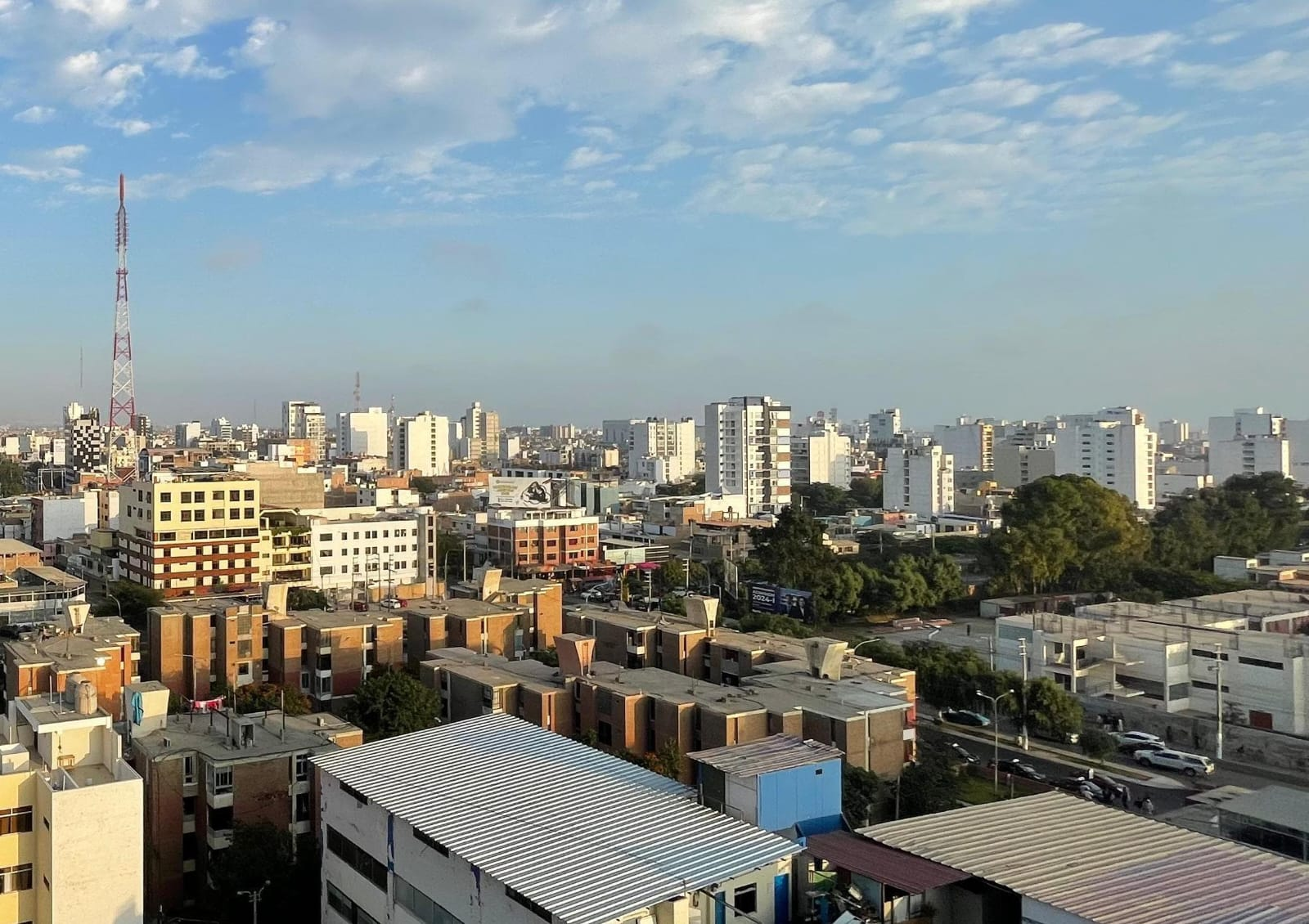
- Plaza de Armas Trujillo Town Hall Hotel Libertador Trujillo Cathedral Beach at Huanchaco Panoramic view of Trujillo

- Flag Coat of arms
- Nicknames: Ciudad de la Eterna Primavera ("City of Everlasting Spring"); Capital de la Cultura Peruana ("Capital of Peruvian Culture"); Capital Nacional de la Marinera ("National Capital of the Marinera"); Ciudad Benemérita y Fidelísima a la Patria ("Meritorious City and Faithful to the Fatherland"); Cuna del Paso Peruano ("Cradle of the Peruvian Paso"); Cuna de la Libertad y la Justicia ("Cradle of Freedom and Justice"); Cuna del Poder Judicial del Perú ("Cradle of the Judiciary of Peru")
- Anthem: Himno a Trujillo
- Interactive map of Trujillo
- Location in Peru Location within South America Location within Earth
- Coordinates: 8°6′43.2″S 79°1′43.68″W
- Country: Peru
- Department: La Libertad
- Province: Trujillo
- District: Trujillo
- Founded: November 1534
- Founder: Diego de Almagro
- Named for: Trujillo, Spain

Government
  - Type: Mayor–council government
  - Mayor: Arturo Fernández Bazán

Area
  - Metro: 1,100 km^{2} (420 sq mi)
- Elevation: 34 m (112 ft)

Population (2025)
  - Rank: 3rd
  - Urban: 1,067,700
  - Metro density: 874.9/km^{2} (2,266/sq mi)
- Demonym: Spanish: Trujillano/a

GDP (PPP, constant 2015 values)
  - Year: 2023
  - Total: $10.5 billion
  - Per capita: $11,600
- Time zone: UTC−5 (PET)
- Postal code: 13001
- Area code: 044
- Patron Saints: San Valentin; Virgin of La Puerta
- Metropolitan area: Trujillo Metropolitano
- Integrated districts: Trujillo; Victor Larco; Huanchaco; Moche; La Esperanza; Laredo; El Porvenir; Salaverry; Florencia de Mora
- Website: Municipality of Trujillo
- Founded as Truxillo de Nueva Castilla (Trujillo of The New Castile) Nearby places: Huanchaco; Buenos Aires; Lake Conache; Chan Chan

Trujillo (Spanish: [tɾuˈxiʝo]; Quechua: Truhillu; Mochica: Cɥimor) is a city in coastal northwestern Peru and the capital of the Department of La Libertad. It is the third most populous city and center of the third most populous metropolitan area of Peru. It is located on the banks of the Moche River, near its mouth at the Pacific Ocean, in the Moche Valley. This was a site of the great prehistoric Moche and Chimu cultures before the Inca conquest and subsequent expansion.

The Independence of Trujillo from Spain was proclaimed in the Historic Centre of Trujillo on December 29, 1820, and the city was honored in 1822 by the Congress of the Republic of Peru with the title "Meritorious City and Faithful to the Fatherland", for its role in the fight for Peruvian independence. Trujillo is the birthplace of Peru's judiciary.

In 1823, Riva Agüero settled in Trujillo after being deposed, but his government lacked legal recognition, while the Congress in Lima continued to function and appointed Torre Tagle as the new president. In 1824, to facilitate the campaign for independence, Trujillo was declared the provisional capital of Peru by Bolívar. It was the scene of a military revolt in 1932. Trujillo is considered the "cradle of liberty and cradle of the judiciary in Peru".

Trujillo is also known as the "City of Everlasting Spring", is considered the "Capital of the Marinera", a traditional dance in Peru, "Cradle of the Peruvian Paso horse", as well as the "Capital of Culture of Peru". It has sponsored numerous national and international cultural events, and has a lively arts community. Current festivals include the "National Marinera Festival", the Trujillo Spring Festival and the International Book Festival, which is one of the most important cultural events in the country.

Trujillo is close to two major archaeological sites of pre-Columbian monuments: Chan Chan, the largest adobe city in the ancient world, designated a World Heritage Site by UNESCO in 1986; and the temples of the Sun and Moon (the largest adobe pyramid in Peru).

The city center contains many examples of colonial and religious architecture, often incorporating distinctive wrought ironwork. It includes residential areas, a central business district, and industrial supply distribution to the various districts. The Roman Catholic Archdiocese of Trujillo has its seat here. Roman Catholicism is the predominant religion and 10 colonial churches are located within the old city wall, now encircled by Avenida España; additional churches in the towns of Huamán, Huanchaco and Moche are located within 15 kilometres (9.3 miles) of Trujillo's centre.

Since 2011, the city has been developing the pilot project Trujillo: Sustainable City, as part of the platform "Emerging and Sustainable Cities of the Inter-American Development Bank", in cooperation with the IDB. In 2012, Trujillo was selected by IBM to participate in a "Smarter Cities Challenge" project intended to improve public safety and transportation through technology.

== Identity ==
=== Capital of culture ===
Trujillo is considered the "Capital of Culture of Peru" for the prominent writers associated with the city such as Cesar Vallejo and Víctor Raúl Haya de la Torre, and because the city is a center for important cultural expressions as the marinera dance, Peruvian paso horses, caballitos de totora, Trujillo's gastronomy, etc. The North Group was formed here, with Eduardo González Viaña and Gerardo Chávez as successors. The city presents important national festivals, such as Marinera Festival, Spring Festival, and competitions for the paso horse and caballito de totora.

=== Symbols ===
==== Coat of arms ====
The coat of arms of the city was awarded on December 7, 1537, by Royal Decree issued by the King of Spain, Charles V. The shield consists of two columns rising from water, a king's crown on top surrounded by pearls and precious stones and two staffs that surround the letter K (for Karolus, royal cypher of the King); and on the back is a black griffin facing right and supporting the shield.

==== Flag ====
The flag is the coat of arms on a white background; it is carried during the official ceremonies of the Municipality of Trujillo in the main square of the city. Also it is flown every December 29 to commemorate the proclamation of independence of Trujillo in 1820.

==== Anthem ====
The anthem was written by Ramiro Mendoza Sánchez in 1974 with music composed by Ramiro Herrera Orbegoso in 1975. The melody and lyrics were subsequently brought together at the Municipal Theater, accompanied by the traditional Band of Musicians of the 32nd Infantry Brigade and the Polyphonic Choir of what was then the National Institute of Culture. The city municipality primarily promotes the anthem through official civic ceremonies held in the city, where it is performed by musical bands. The anthem expresses a greeting to and recognition of the city through a celebration of its history.

Spanish original

Coro:
¡Salve Joven y heroica Trujillo,
solariega ciudad colonial
que, al tocar tu conciencia la aurora
pronunciaras la voz Libertad!

Estrofa I
En tus calles palpita la historia
de la Ibérica espada que vino
a trazar tu glorioso destino
entre el Ande bravio y el mar,
donde estuvo el ceramio Mochica,
sobre el río el desierto y la duna,
y las Huacas del Sol y la Luna,
y el Coloso de adobe Chan Chan

Estrofa II
De tus pasos emergen unidos
señorio trabajo y hazaña.
Tus blasone vinieron de España
con la rueda, el idioma y la cruz.
Eres cuna de la Independencia
ante un pueblo viril que se inflama,
Torre Tagle lanzó la proclama
que esperaba con ansias el Perú.

Estrofa III
Marinera mestiza y peruana,
Primavera y Caballos de paso.
En tu azúcar melaza y bagazo
late el hombre del cañaveral
vas creciendo al amor de tus hijos;
harás fértiles los arenales
que natura no quizo irrigar.

Estrofa IV
Han quedado en tu acervo tres siglos
de colonia que fue mestizaje;
han quedado también el mensaje
de tu grito de emancipación.
Pueblos jóvenes que surgen ahora
más allá de tus viejas murallas;
su mensaje es valor, fé y acción.

English translation

Chorus:
Hail, youthful and heroic Trujillo,
ancestral colonial city,
when dawn touches your conscience,
will proclaim the voice: Freedom!

Verse I
History beats within your streets,
of the Iberian sword that came
to forge your glorious destiny
between the fierce Andes and the sea,
where the Moche pottery once stood,
amid the river, desert, and dune,
and the Temples of the Sun and Moon,
and the adobe Colossus of Chan Chan

Verse II
From your footsteps emerge, united,
lordship, labor, and heroic deeds.
Your coats of arms came from Spain,
along with the wheel, the language, and the cross.
You are the cradle of Independence,
before a vigorous people ablaze;
Torre Tagle proclaimed the call
that Peru had eagerly awaited.

Verse III
Mestizo and Peruvian marinera,
Springtime and Paso horses.
In your sugar, molasses, and bagasse,
beats the heart of the cane-field worker.
You grow through the love of your children;
you will make fertile the sandy lands
that nature did not wish to irrigate.

Verse IV
Three centuries remain in your heritage,
of a colonial era that became mestizaje;
there also remains the message
of your cry for emancipation.
Young communities now rise
beyond your ancient walls;
their message is courage, faith, and action.

== History ==
The history of Trujillo has its beginning in ancient times, as the area at the mouth of the Moche River was long a center of successive pre-European cultures. They extended their domains along the northern coast of Peru.

=== Pre-Columbian era ===
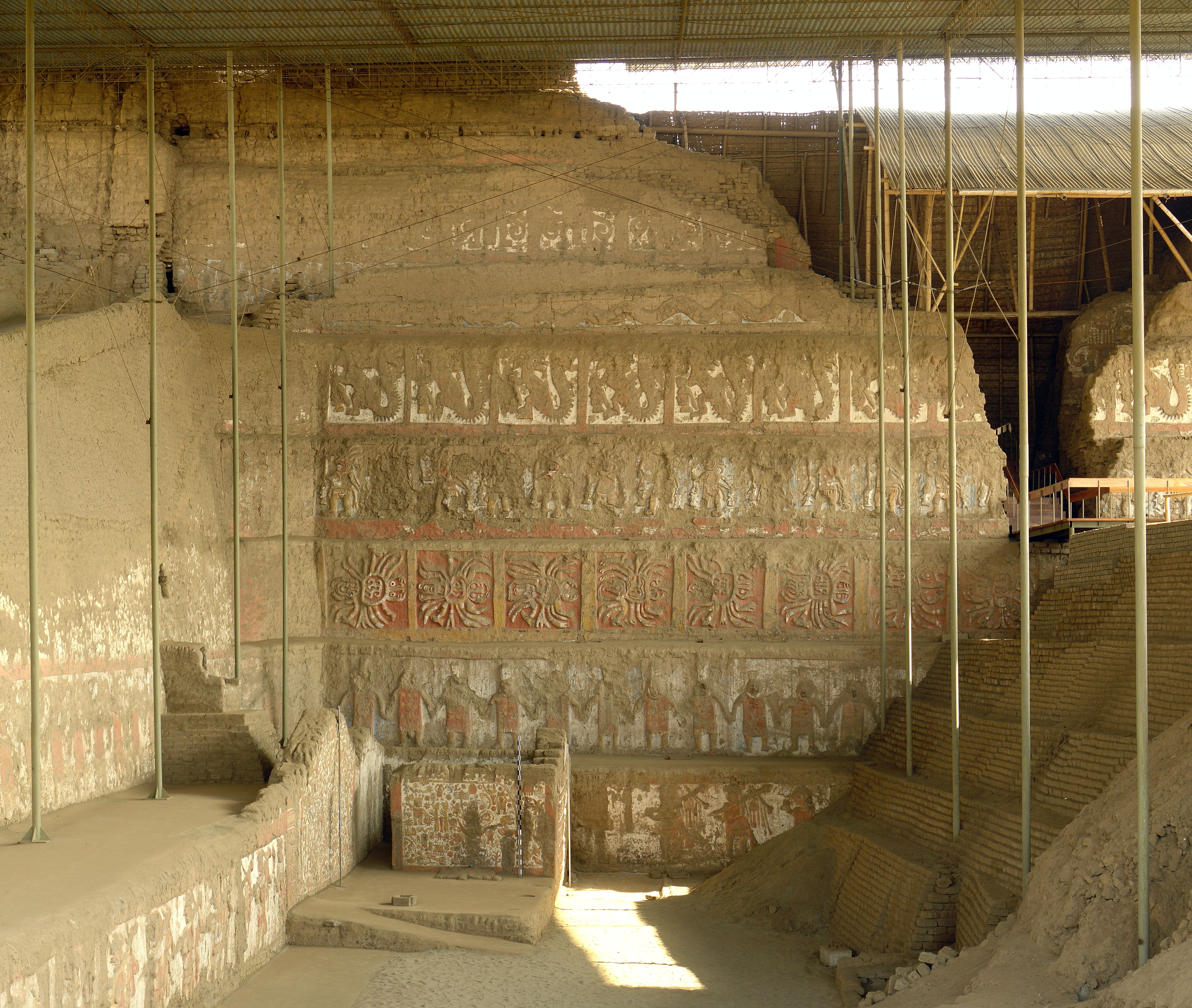
Mural of the Huaca de la Luna archaeological site in the district of Moche

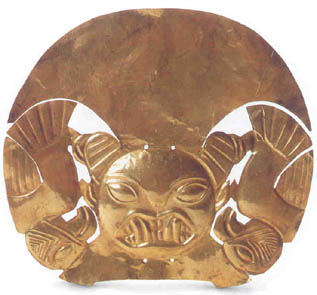
Moche headdress, c. AD 400

The archaeological history of this region goes back to the early pre-ceramic period. For example, Huaca Prieta was occupied as early as 4700 BC.

Several ancient cultures developed in this area: the Cupisnique, the Moche and Chimu. Numerous archaeological sites and monumental remains attest to the high degree of complexity of these civilizations.

Among the Cupisnique culture sites are Caballo Muerto and Huaca Prieta.

The Moche culture sites include huacas: the Temples of the Sun and Moon south of the city, the Huaca del Dragón (or Rainbow Huaca) and the Huaca Esmeralda to the north, and others.

The Chimu culture built its primary settlement at what is known as Chan Chan, which was the capital, having an estimated 100,000 people at its peak. It is the largest pre-Columbian city built of adobe and has been designated a UNESCO World Heritage Site. Its remains are 5 km (3 miles) northwest of the current city center. The present Spanish–Peruvian city of Trujillo was founded in an ancestral territory populated by ancient indigenous civilizations. The Spanish founded new cities expressing their culture in what they called the "Viceroyalty of Peru".

==== Southern Moche civilization ====
The Southern Moche civilization flourished in northern Peru with its Huacas del Sol y de la Luna from about AD 100 to 800, during the Regional Development Epoch. The people likely had formed into a group of autonomous polities that shared a common elite culture, as seen in the rich iconography and monumental architecture that survive today. They are particularly noted for their elaborately painted ceramics, gold work, monumental constructions (huacas) and irrigation systems.

Moche history is broadly divided into three periods – the emergence of the Moche culture in the Early Moche (AD 100–300), its expansion and florescence during the Middle Moche (300–600), and the urban nucleation and subsequent collapse in the Late Moche (500–750). Moche society was agriculture-based, and the cultural leaders invested in the construction of a network of irrigation canals for the diversion of river water to supply the crops. Their culture was sophisticated; and their artifacts fully express their lives, including scenes of hunting, fishing, fighting, sacrifice, elaborate ceremonies, and sexual acts.

==== Chimu Empire ====
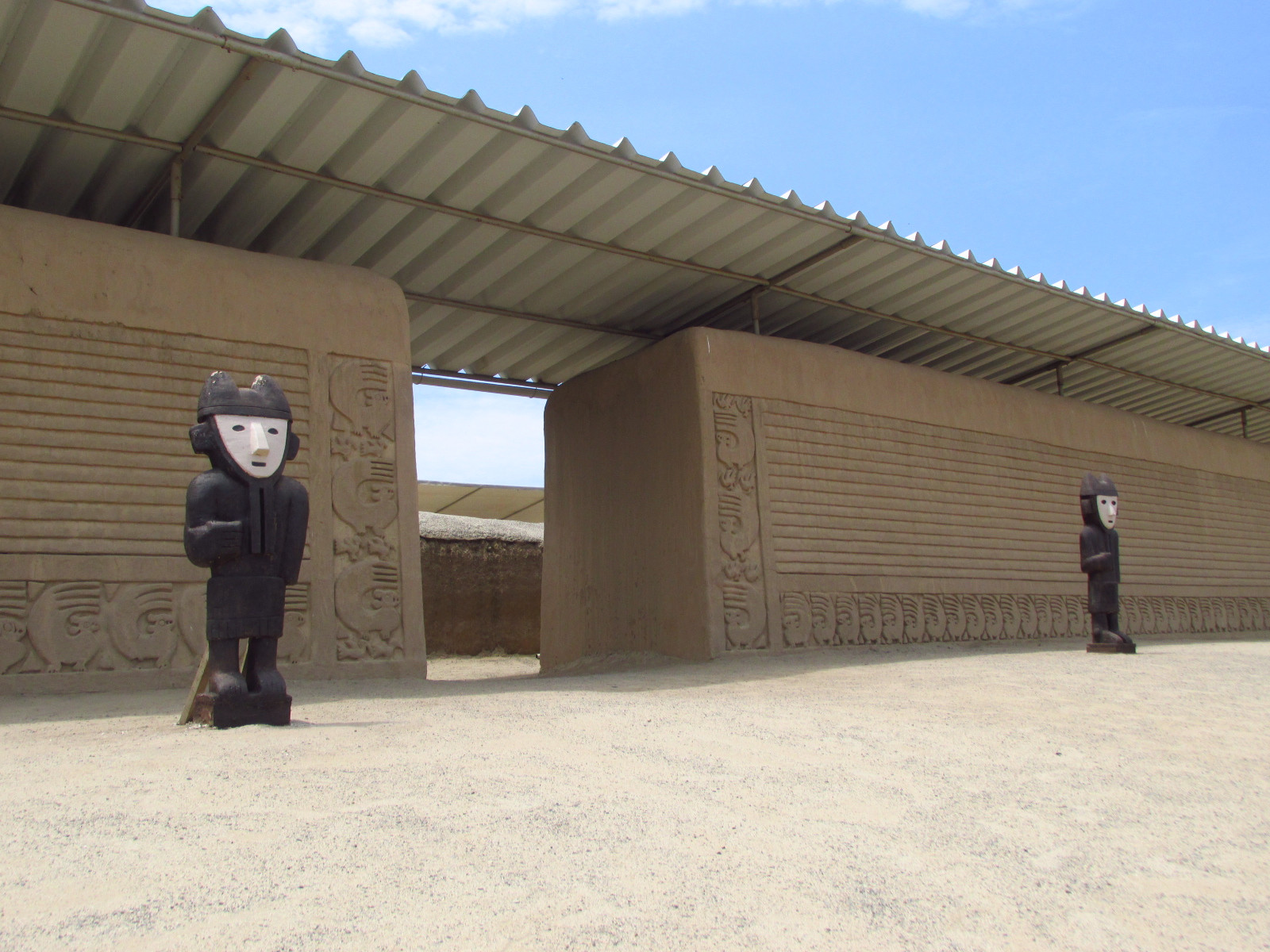
Nik An Palace of Chan Chan

The Chimu built and occupied a territory known as Chimor, with its capital at the city of Chan Chan, a large adobe city in the Valley of Moche (around which present-day Trujillo city developed). The culture arose about 900 and flourished into the 14th century.

The Chimos were characterized by speaking the Quingnam language, one of the languages that is certain to have existed in the ancient province of Trujillo:

[A] cacique of what is today called Trujillo, called the Chimo [...] was conquering the Yunga indians, and making the provinces of these plains from Paramonga to Paita and Tumbes tributaries [...] and with his power he was introducing his native language, which is the one spoken today in the valleys of Trujillo. It was Quingnam, the language of this lord [...]

— Antonio de la Calancha (1584-1654)

The Inca ruler Tupac Inca Yupanqui led a campaign which conquered the Chimu in around 1470.

This was just 50 years before the arrival of the Spanish in the region. Consequently, Spanish chroniclers recorded accounts of Chimu culture from persons who had lived before the Inca conquest. Similarly, archaeological evidence suggest Chimor emerged from the remnants of Moche culture; early Chimu pottery had some resemblance to that of the Moche. Their ceramics are all-black, and their work in precious metals is very detailed and intricate. In the Late Chimu period, about 12,000 artisans lived and worked in Chan Chan alone. They engaged in fishing, agriculture, craft work, and trade. Artisans were forbidden to change their profession, and were grouped together in the citadel according to their area of specialization. Archaeologists have noted a dramatic rise in the volume of Chimu craft production, which they attribute to artisans having been brought to Chan Chan from another area taken in conquest. As there is evidence of both metalwork (generally a male specialty) and weaving (a female art) in the same domestic dwelling, it is likely that both men and women were artisans. The men engaged in fishing, heavy agriculture (aided by irrigation and earthworks), and metallurgy. The women made ceramics and textiles (from spun and dyed cotton, llama, alpaca, and vicuña wool). People used reed fishing canoes, hunted, and traded using bronze coins.

In 2018 archaeologists uncovered the world's largest child-sacrifice site at Trujillo. National Geographic discovered the remains of over 140 children and the skeletons of llamas, apparently the result of ritual sacrifice.

=== Colonial era ===
==== Spanish foundation ====
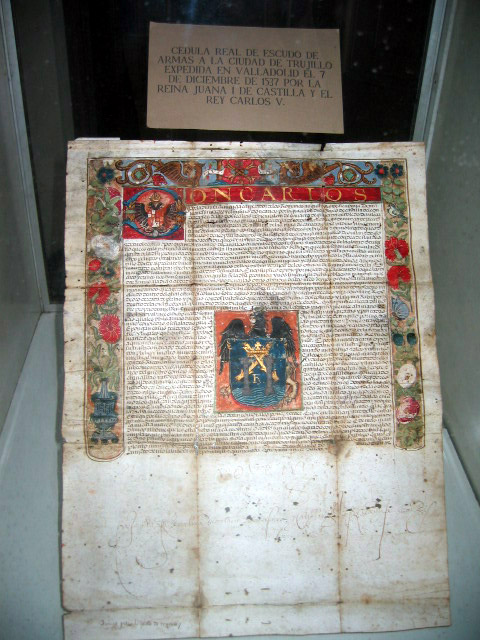
Royal decree granting the coat of arms.

Trujillo was one of the first cities in the Americas founded by the Spanish conquistadors. They arrived in an area that had been inhabited and developed for thousands of years by the indigenous peoples. According to historian Napoleón Cieza Burga, the conquistador Diego de Almagro founded the first settlement in November 1534, calling it Trujillo of New Castile after Trujillo, the home city of Francisco Pizarro. It was founded among four Chimu settlements: Huanchaco, Huamán, Moche and Mampuesto, to create an alliance against the Incas. On November 23, 1537, King Charles I of Spain gave the town the rank of 'city' and the coat of arms that remains a symbol for the city; it was the first city in Peru to receive a coat of arms from the king. By 1544 Trujillo had around 300 homes and 1,000 inhabitants, and an economy booming from the cultivation of sugar cane, wheat, and other food crops and the raising of livestock.

The Spanish colonists welcomed a diverse array of religious orders from the time of its founding, and there was a boom in church construction in the city during the 16th and 17th centuries. In 1577 Pope Gregory XIII created the Diocese of Trujillo, and in 1616 construction work commenced on the cathedral.

On February 14, 1619, Trujillo was struck by an earthquake, resulting in the near-total destruction of the city and the deaths of around 400 of its inhabitants. Rebuilding was slow. The people developed a devotion to Saint Valentine, on whose day the earthquake hit. The Jesuits opened a seminary and school for the education and training of priests; they also served as missionaries to the indigenous peoples, as they introduced Christianity.

==== 17th century ====
===== The Wall of Trujillo =====
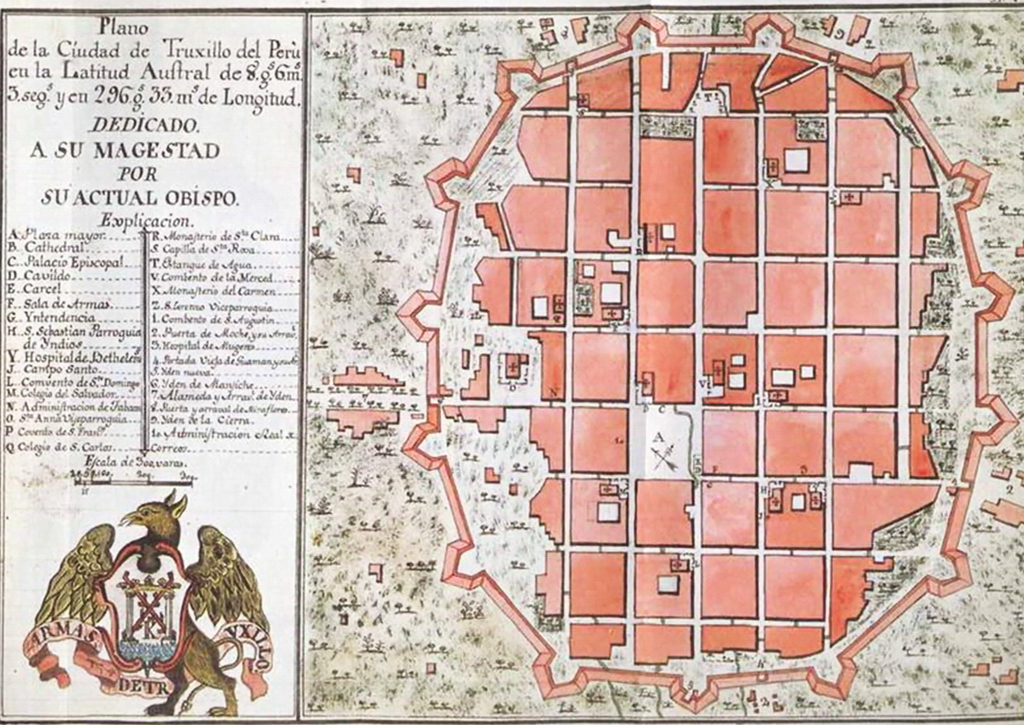
Map of Trujillo in 1786, by Baltasar Jaime Martínez Compañón, showing the City Walls of Trujillo

Due to the proximity of the city to the sea (about 4 km [2.5 miles] away) and the danger of attack by pirates and privateers, the Wall of Trujillo was built for defense during the reign of Viceroy Melchor de Navarra and Rocafull and the city mayors Bartolome Martinez and Fernando Ramirez Jarabeitia Orellana. This wall was built by an Italian architect, Giuseppe Formento, who began construction on February 19, 1687. Formento based his design on that by Leonardo da Vinci for the Italian city of Florence. The wall was designed in an elliptical shape to save costs in its construction, and was completed in 1689. The wall reached a perimeter of 5.5 km (3.4 miles) and used more than 100,000 bricks. The defensive structure was composed of 15 bastions, 15 shades and 5 covered gates.

The Huamán Gate was oriented westward to the road to the village of the same name. The Mansiche Gate was located to the north, giving way to the highway. The Miraflores Gate opened to the east. The Sierra Gate was named after the road leading to this region. Lastly, the Moche Gate gave access to people coming from the south. In 1942 the city developed a master plan; following the path of the ancient wall, it built Avenida España to encircle the area now called the Historical Center of Trujillo.

In the latter half of the 17th century, severe droughts and pestilence caused a major economic crisis for the city, which depended on agriculture. Trujillo regained prominence in the 18th century, in part due to the destruction of the city of Saña by flooding in 1720. Trujillo also suffered from flooding in 1701, 1720, 1728 and 1814; and earthquakes in 1725 and 1759.

By 1760 an estimated 9,200 people were living in the vicinity of the city. The foundation of the Municipality of Trujillo in 1779 coincided with a peak of prosperity for the city. Numerous undeveloped lots remained within the city walls but Trujillo was regarded as one of the most important cities in Northern Peru during the colonial era.

=== Independence ===
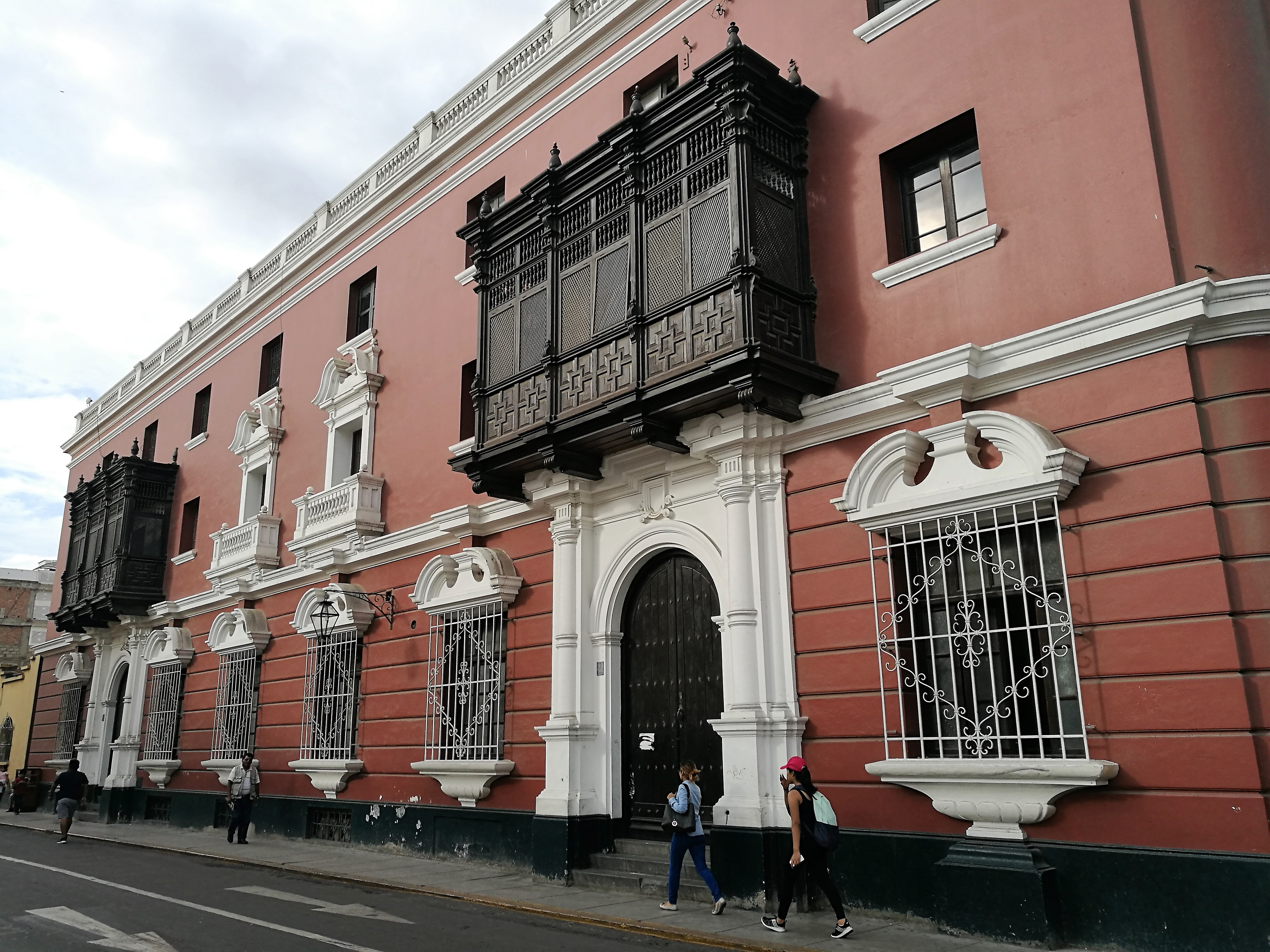
Independence Street in front of Main Square, at right El Libertador Hotel

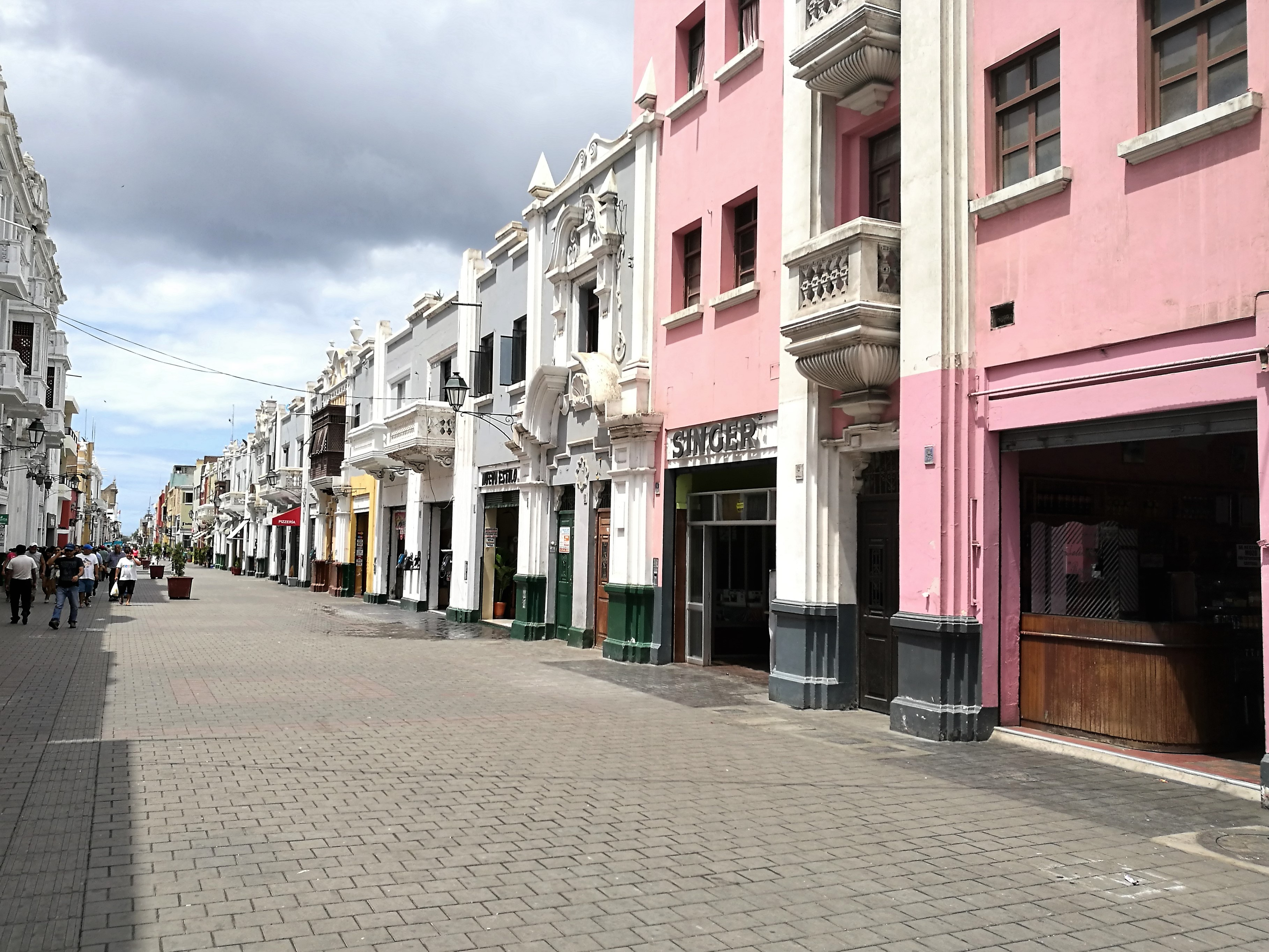
Architecture of Paseo Pizarro, one of the busiest streets in the historic center of Trujillo. In the background is the historic Plazuela El Recreo, with tall trees forming the skyline in that part of the city.

Inspired by liberal ideas from members of its educational institutions, Trujillo became a principal centre of Peruvian republican sentiments. Led by the city mayor and intendant José Bernardo de Tagle, the Intendancy of Trujillo declared its independence from Spain on December 29, 1820.

Between 1821 and 1825 the Trujillo region was the only stable and productive land within the nascent republic. In 1823, in response to the counterattack by royalist troops who took the city of Lima, the Congress, convened in Callao, decreed on June 21 to move the seat of government to Trujillo. However, just a few days later, on June 23, the Congress removed José de la Riva Agüero from the office of President of the Republic. Upon learning of these events, Riva Agüero embarked for Trujillo along with his ministers and part of the deputies. Once in the city, on June 26, he established his government seat, dissolved the Congress, and created a Senate of ten members. From there, he governed de facto until August 6, 1823.

On March 26, 1824, the Superior Court of the North (now the Superior Court of Justice of La Libertad), the first Superior Court of Justice in Peru, was founded. In the same year, the city welcomed the liberating army of Simón Bolívar, who assumed the government of the country and established in Trujillo the national accounts, the official gazette, and the general staff, on March 8, 1824. Later, by decree of March 26, 1824, Trujillo was designated as the provisional capital of the republic, while Lima was liberated.

The years following the revolution saw the growth in the economic influence of the city, compensating for a loss of political power to Lima when it was designated as the capital, which instead suffered from the resulting political turmoil. The Moche and Chicama valleys emerged as new economic enclaves for the sugar cane industry. Land was increasingly concentrated in large estates and a new "agricultural aristocracy" developed that was linked to and influenced national political power. The policy of free trade and openness to foreign investment attracted an influx of Europeans, principally from Britain and Germany. By then, Trujillo had a population of 15,000 and began to grow beyond the city walls. New architectural styles were adopted, influenced by French and English Romanticism.

During the War of the Pacific against Chile between 1879 and 1883, Trujillo contributed troops towards national defence. Although never a site of battle, Trujillo suffered from occupation by Chilean troops and their plundering of the surrounding countryside.

==== First Independent City of Peru ====
It is considered the "First Independent City of Peru" for three reasons: it proclaimed independence from Spain on December 24, 1820 at the historical "Casa de la Emancipación" (House of Emancipation). Its leaders signed the declaration of independence at the Seminario de San Carlos y San Marcelo and proclaimed independence to an open council meeting in the Plaza de Armas, on December 29, 1820. Finally, on January 6, 1821, its leaders ratified the agreement and the proclamation of the independence of this city, as stated in the document called Libro rojo (the Red Book) of the Trujillo council.

Their actions gained independence for almost all of northern Peru, because the government of Trujillo city ruled what is now the regions of Tumbes, Piura, Lambayeque, La Libertad, Cajamarca, San Martín and Amazonas. Marquis of Torre Tagle said, "My people. From this time for the unanimous will of the people, Trujillo is free. I put our fate and that of people under the protection of Heaven! Long live the homeland! Long live independence!"

=== Republican era ===
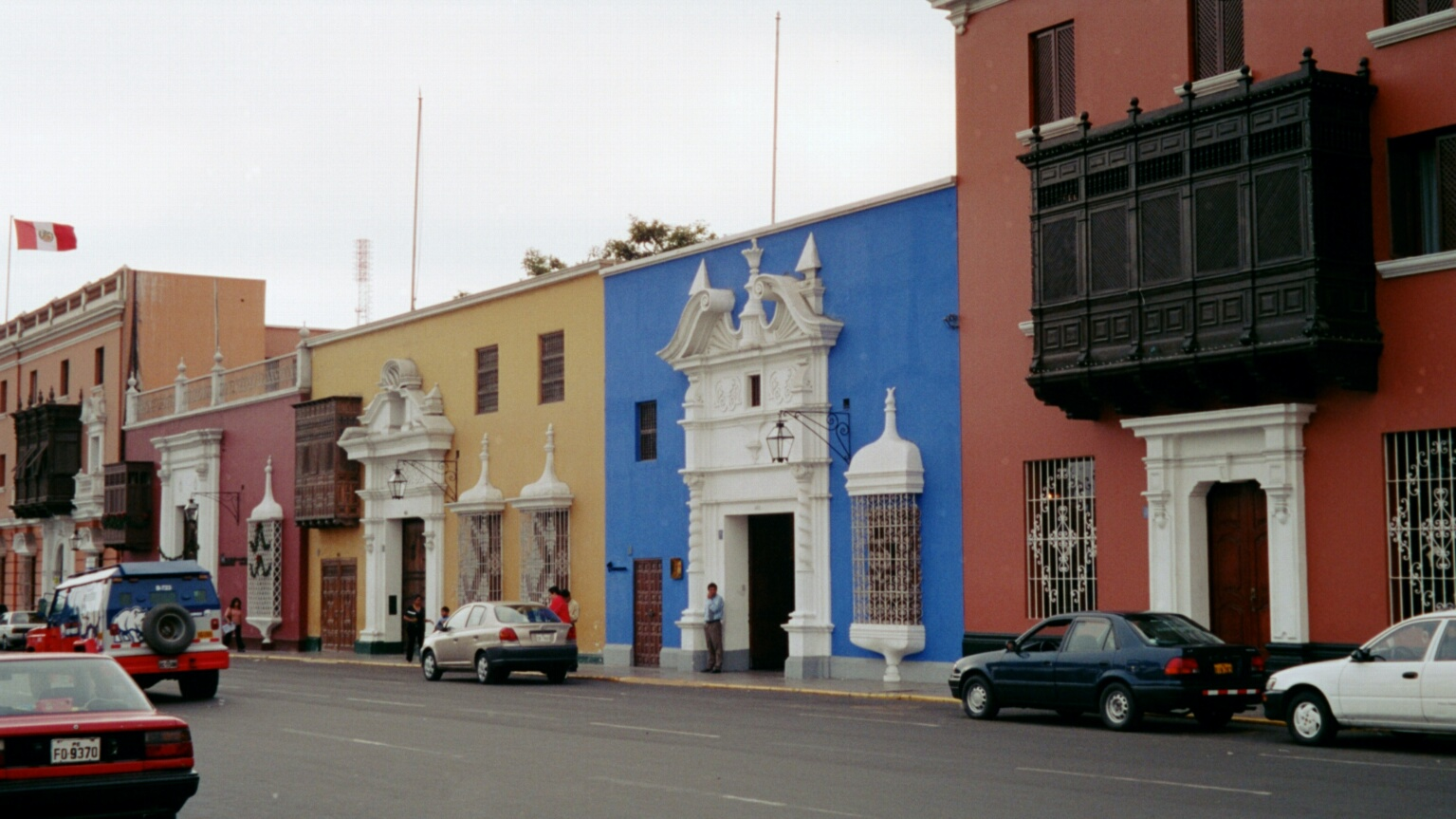
Architecture of the 18th and 19th centuries, Plaza de Armas

The Provisional Regulations given by General San Martín in 1821 created the Department of Trujillo, based on colonial administration. This status was acknowledged in the first Constitution of Peru in 1823. Because of its size and economic wealth, the Department of Trujillo between 1821 and 1825 was the only stable and productive area that could organize and lead the nascent republic. The department encompassed nearly half the country. For the efforts of its people in the war of emancipation, San Martín gave it the title of "Meritorious City Loyal to the Homeland". The municipality of the city, then called a cabildo, was given the rank of "honorable".

In 1823, after the creation of the Republic of Peru, the protectorate of José de San Martín was developed. Before royal troops took the city of Lima, the first President of Peru, Don José de la Riva Agüero, together with Sánchez Carrión, named Trujillo as provisional capital of the country, which survived for a short period.

In 1824 the city received the liberation army of Simón Bolívar. Taking over the government of the country, he established a temporary government of the country in Trujillo, on March 8, 1824.

In 1821 the Court of Appeals was created to replace the Royal Court. Its jurisdiction extended over the present departments of Cajamarca, Piura, Lambayeque, Amazonas (then known as the Chachapoyas), and Huamachuco (then known as Sánchez Carrión). On March 26, 1824 Simón Bolívar established Trujillo's first Superior Court of Justice as the Northern Superior Court. It had been the first high court established in the Republic of Peru with the powers of the Supreme Court.

==== 19th century ====
By the end of the 19th century the five entrances had disappeared from the city, so it was that during this time the Wall of Trujillo was torn down and allowed the growth of the city. This urban expansion allowed the establishment of the neighborhoods of Chicago, La Unión and Pedro Muñiz. During the administration of Don Víctor Larco Herrera as mayor, the city began upgrading works such as the construction of City Hall, the arrangement and embellishment of the Plaza de Armas and the atrium of the cathedral. It also built the road to the resort of Buenos Aires, which expanded the city urban planning perspective. Another project was the renovation of the Municipal Theater.

==== 20th century ====
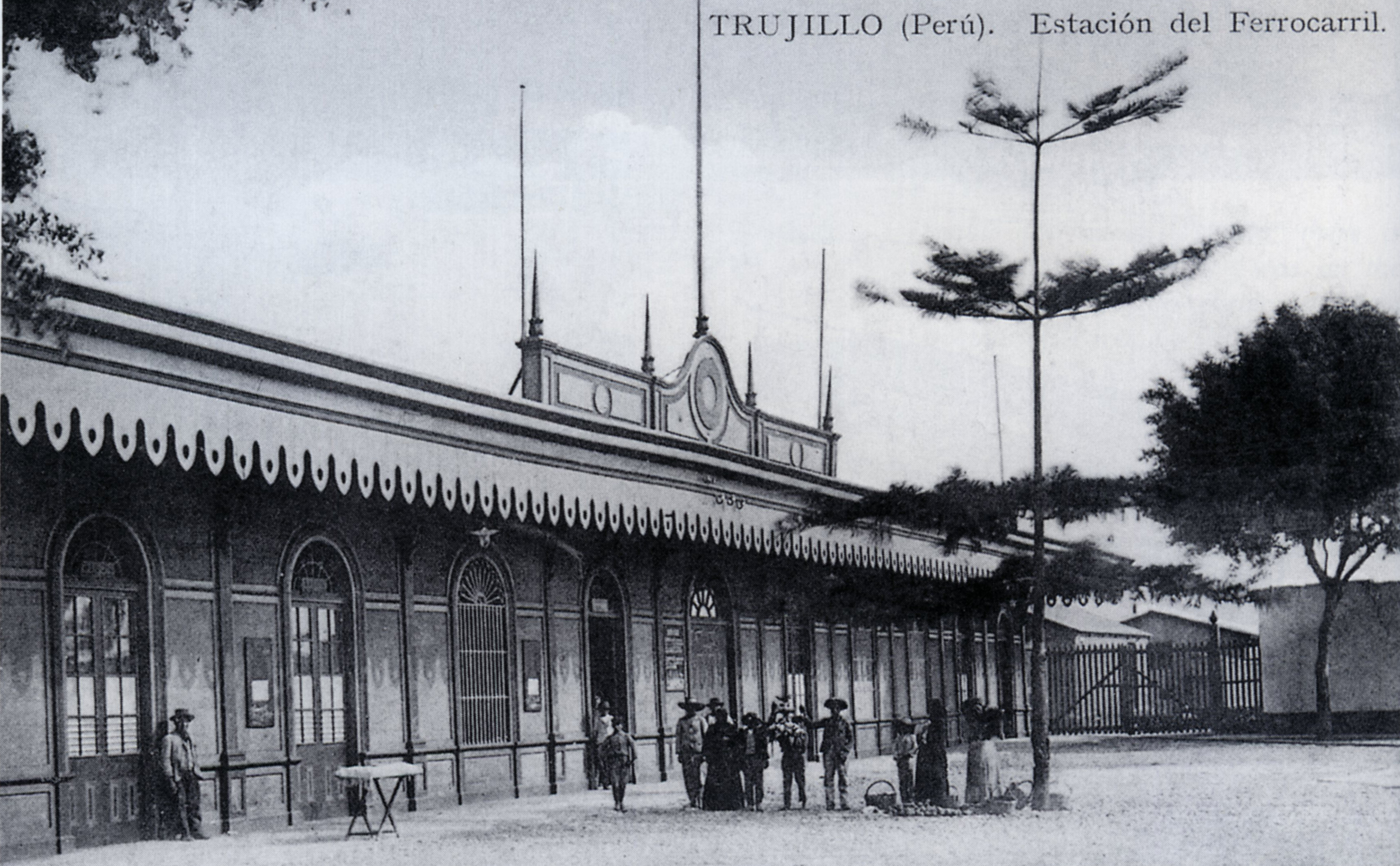
Trujillo rail station in the early 20th century

In July 1932, Trujillo was once again at the centre of one of the most important episodes in the history of the Republic of Peru, the 1932 Trujillo uprising, which cost the lives of many citizens. Although this year came to be known as the "year of barbarism", it would also mark the political identity of the city during the second half of the 20th century.

The latter half of the 20th century saw the expansion of the city due to a combination of rural-to-urban migration and the consolidation of surrounding districts into the Trujillo metropolitan area.

From 1980 Trujillo took on the aspect and behavior of a particularly dynamic metropolitan area, by which time the growth of the city and adjoining districts had produced a single metropolitan area, so in the 1980s the nascent Trujillo metropolitan area consisted of the integrated urban districts of Trujillo, El Porvenir and Florencia de Mora, with Víctor Larco Herrera and La Esperanza remaining discontinuous districts. In 1981 the city had 403,337 inhabitants. Also in the 1980s the Trujillo Industrial Park project was begun, located on the north side of the city, in the present La Esperanza district.

With the advent of the 1990s, the city of Trujillo was unified with the districts of La Esperanza and Victor Larco Herrera and the spread of the city resulted in the districts of Moche, Trujillo, Salaverry, and Laredo becoming part of the metropolitan area. In the first half of the 1990s, after the emergence of the El Milagro area in Huanchaco, it was joined to La Esperanza district, and increasing interdependence with the districts of Moche and Laredo, which was cemented Trujillo as a new metropolis of Peru, then with a population of 589,314 inhabitants.

==== 21st century ====
===== Modernization of the city =====
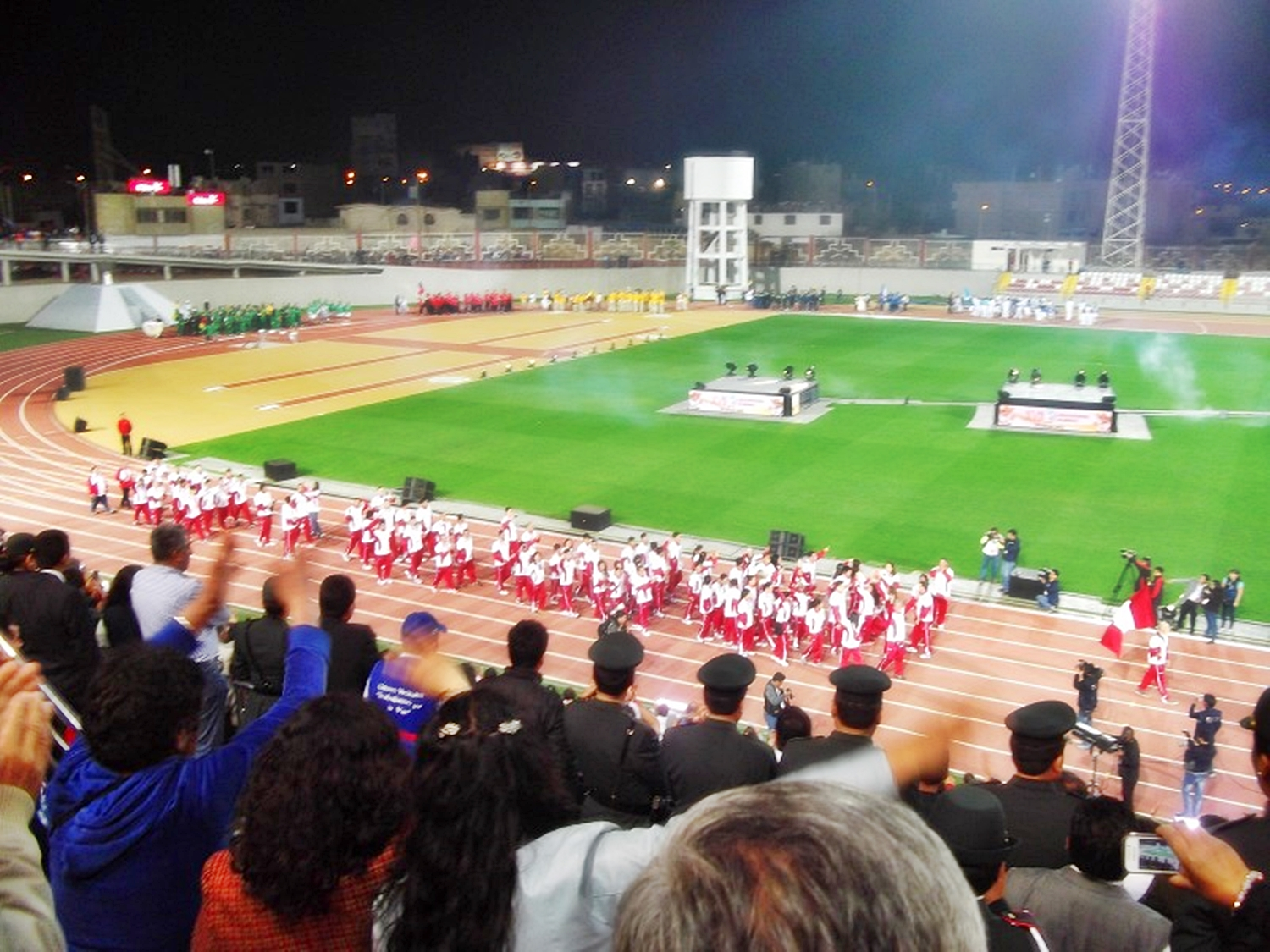
2013 Bolivarian Games opening ceremony, held in Trujillo

With the experience of the last two decades of the 20th century, when the city experienced an excessive disordered growth while increasing the costs for providing basic services to the population, the Provincial Municipality of Trujillo created the Trujillo Metropolitan Development Plan 2010, known as "Plandemetru", which was approved by city ordinance on November 30, 1995. Through this was planned the growth and development of the city up to 2010; later the lines of development of the metropolis were governed by the "Strategic Plan for Integral Development and Sustainable Trujillo till 2015" containing general guidelines for the development of the city by 2015.

===== Sustainable and smart city =====
In November 2010, Trujillo was the first city in Latin America and the Caribbean to be chosen by the Inter-American Development Bank (IDB) to develop the pilot "Sustainable City" project as part of the platform "Emerging and Sustainable Cities of the Inter-American Development Bank". This project includes a plan of action on climate change, which will be held on emissions limits in Trujillo, and will review the list of investment projects with respect to climate sustainability. According to IDB representative Fidel Jaramillo, Trujillo was chosen as the first driver of progress in Latin America to develop a new initiative. Trujillo's plan is to conceive from other perspectives such as fiscal and financial sustainability, which is basic, but also from environmental sustainability and quality of life. The IDB is developing relevant projects in coordination with the Provincial Municipality of Trujillo. In 2012 Trujillo began to develop, with the support of American technology corporation IBM, the "Smart City" project, which will try to focus technologically on the two problems of public safety and transportation.

== Geography ==
=== Location ===
Trujillo is located at an altitude of 34 metres (112 feet) on a coastal strip in the west of the province of Trujillo, in the old valley of Chimor today known as the Moche or Santa Catalina Valley. Its main square is located at 8°6′3″S 79°1′34″W longitude at an altitude of 31.16 metres (102.23 feet) above sea level and lies 4.40 kilometres (2.73 miles) inland from the Pacific Ocean, in a straight line along Avenido Larco.

=== Climate ===
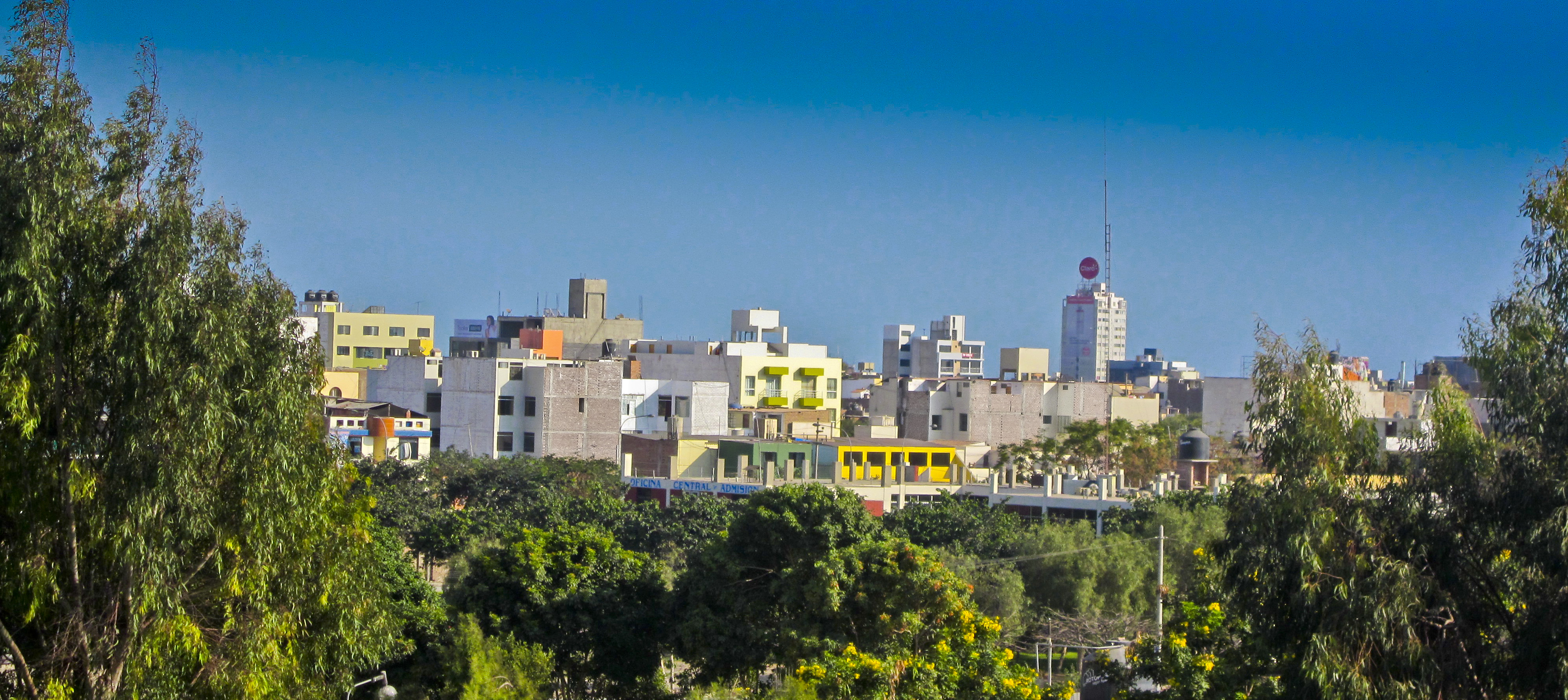
Panoramic view of Trujillo

This city has a desert climate (BWh, according to the Köppen climate classification) and it is known as La Ciudad de la Eterna Primavera (city of everlasting spring) because of its sunny and pleasant weather year-round. The International Spring Festival in early October attracts visitors from all over Peru and the world. The city is in an area of mild climate and low rainfall, with moderate temperatures ranging between 14 and 30 °C (57 and 86 °F) due to the Humboldt Current. Trujillo has a warm climate during the day and mild during the night due to the sea breeze. It has an average temperature of 18 °C (64 °F), and the extreme minimum and maximum temperatures fluctuate between 17 and 28 °C (63 and 82 °F) in winter and summer, respectively. Rains are light, sporadic and occur during the afternoon or evening. The Andes and their foothills are very close to the coast, and having a lower elevation relative to the mountains of central and southern Peru, the flow of moist air from the Amazon region, which converges with the sea breezes from the west, favors during the summer a higher frequency of light showers. According to the climate classification of Thornthwaite, city of Trujillo would correspond to an arid climate type with no rain during all seasons.

The parts of the city closest to the sea experience haze during the morning and usually the temperature is lower than in the central and upper parts of the city. However, during the phenomenon of El Niño the climate varies, mainly the rainfall, with less intensity than in regions located north of the city, and the temperature can also be lifted.

Climate data for Trujillo (1991–2020 normals, extremes 1943–present)
Month	Jan	Feb	Mar	Apr	May	Jun	Jul	Aug	Sep	Oct	Nov	Dec	Year
Record high °C (°F)	32.0 (89.6)	35.0 (95.0)	36.0 (96.8)	35.0 (95.0)	32.7 (90.9)	30.0 (86.0)	29.3 (84.7)	27.0 (80.6)	27.4 (81.3)	30.5 (86.9)	28.0 (82.4)	29.5 (85.1)	36.0 (96.8)
Mean daily maximum °C (°F)	27.1 (80.8)	28.2 (82.8)	27.6 (81.7)	25.9 (78.6)	24.0 (75.2)	22.4 (72.3)	21.4 (70.5)	21.1 (70.0)	21.1 (70.0)	21.8 (71.2)	23.0 (73.4)	24.8 (76.6)	24.0 (75.3)
Mean daily minimum °C (°F)	19.4 (66.9)	20.4 (68.7)	20.0 (68.0)	18.2 (64.8)	17.2 (63.0)	16.8 (62.2)	15.9 (60.6)	15.3 (59.5)	15.2 (59.4)	15.4 (59.7)	15.9 (60.6)	17.5 (63.5)	17.3 (63.1)
Record low °C (°F)	11.6 (52.9)	9.8 (49.6)	8.0 (46.4)	11.1 (52.0)	10.0 (50.0)	7.0 (44.6)	8.0 (46.4)	8.0 (46.4)	9.0 (48.2)	8.0 (46.4)	8.8 (47.8)	11.0 (51.8)	7.0 (44.6)
Average precipitation mm (inches)	2.3 (0.09)	7.0 (0.28)	9.1 (0.36)	1.4 (0.06)	0.2 (0.01)	0.0 (0.0)	0.0 (0.0)	0.0 (0.0)	0.2 (0.01)	0.4 (0.02)	0.2 (0.01)	1.5 (0.06)	22.3 (0.9)
Average precipitation days (≥ 1.0 mm)	1.3	0.6	0.9	0.6	0.0	0.0	0.0	0.0	0.0	0.0	0.1	0.4	3.9
Average relative humidity (%)	84	81	81	82	86	84	86	85	86	86	84	82	84
Mean monthly sunshine hours	170.5	159.6	145.7	144.0	170.5	120.0	117.8	105.4	114.0	142.6	156.0	173.6	1,719.7
Mean daily sunshine hours	5.5	5.6	4.7	4.8	5.5	4.0	3.8	3.4	3.8	4.6	5.2	5.6	4.7
Source 1: National Meteorology and Hydrology Service of Peru Meteo Climat (record highs and lows)
Source 2: Deutscher Wetterdienst (precipitation days 1970–1990 and humidity 1975–1985)FAO (sun 1971–2000)

=== Hydrography ===
Trujillo is crossed by the Moche River that passes to the south of the city; its waters have been used since ancient times by the Moche and Chimu who inhabited this area, who took its waters to irrigate their fields; today the river is part of the countryside of Moche and its waters continue to be used for irrigation. The river empties into the Pacific Ocean right on the boundary between the districts of Moche and Víctor Larco Herrera.

=== Physiography ===
Trujillo is set on a coastal plain of the La Libertad Region and has a gentle topography with hilly terrain, sitting on a plateau of the Trujillo Province. The low-lying areas of the city are very close to the Pacific Ocean and the higher elevations are close to the Andean foothills.

== Demographics ==
=== 2007 census ===
About the spatial distribution of the population of the city and the urban continuum of Trujillo in 2007, there are two positions:

According to the report "Sociodemographic Profile" issued by the INEI In 2007, the city had a population of up to 682,834 people, with an annual average growth rate of 2.1%; According to the report "Peru: Recent Internal Migration and Cities System 2001 – 2007", in 2007 the figure was 709,566 inhabitants.

Moreover, considering the studies of urban development of the "PLANDET", the city is formed by the five districts that make up the conurbation of the districts of Trujillo, La Esperanza, El Porvenir, Florencia de Mora and Victor Larco Herrera in addition these also the minor municipality called "El Milagro" in the jurisdiction of Huanchaco district, which make up the urban continuum of Trujillo city; and the urban area known as "Trujillo Metropolitano" comprises the urban continuum and the urban and rural towns of the districts of the metropolitan area including such as are Huanchaco, Laredo, Moche and Salaverry.

In recent decades, urban growth is largely due to Trujillo population increase of migrant origin, the main contributors of population (1993 census), the interior provinces of La Libertad as Otuzco (15.8%), Santiago de Chuco (9.3%), Ascope (9%) and Sánchez Carrión (5.2%), while 16% contributed Cajamarca and Ancash with 5%;

- In the following table is shown the population of Trujillo Metropolitan distributed by districts:

Trujillo Metropolitan Area
Districts of Trujillo Metropolitan	Data by Districts						
Districts of Trujillo Metropolitan	Median elevation (msl)	Distance (Approx.) to Historic Centre of Trujillo (km)	Ubigeo	Area ([[km^{2}]])	Density (inhabitants/km^{2})	Population; 2007	Population; 2015 (Est.)
1. Trujillo	34	0	130101	39,36	7.035,5	294.899	318.914
2. Victor Larco Herrera	3	5	130111	18,02	7.035,5	294.899	64.024
3. La Esperanza	77	4	130105	18,64	7,8	151.845	182.494
4. El Porvenir	90	4	130102	36,7	3.609,29	140.507	186.127
5. Huanchaco	23	12	130104	333,9	114,2	44.806	68.104
6. Florencia de Mora	85	5	130101	1,99	18.802,5	40.014	41.914
7. Laredo	89	7	130106	335,44	96,17	32.825	35.289
8. Moche	4	7	130107	25,25	1.146,7	29.727	34.503
9. Salaverry	3	14	130109	390,55	33,67	13.892	18.129
Trujillo Metropolitan	-	-	-	110.000	837	804.296	949.498
Sources INEI: Population 2007; Estimated population 2015

- Graphics of the population.

A comparison Chart of the city and metropolitan population of Trujillo, in the bars in green color It is shown the evolution of the population of the city and the blue bars show the population of Trujillo metropolitan. According to INEI in 2014 Trujillo metropolitan, with a population of 935,147 people is Peru's second largest metropolis by population.

Comparison Chart of Trujillo city and Trujillo metropolitan population

Population of Trujillo city.
Population of Trujillo Metropolitan
Population 1804, Census (Gil de Toboada),
Population 1812, Viceroyalty of Peru
Population 1876, Census of inhabitants of Peru 1876
Population 1940- 1993, PLANDEMETRU,
Population estimate 2014

=== Religion ===
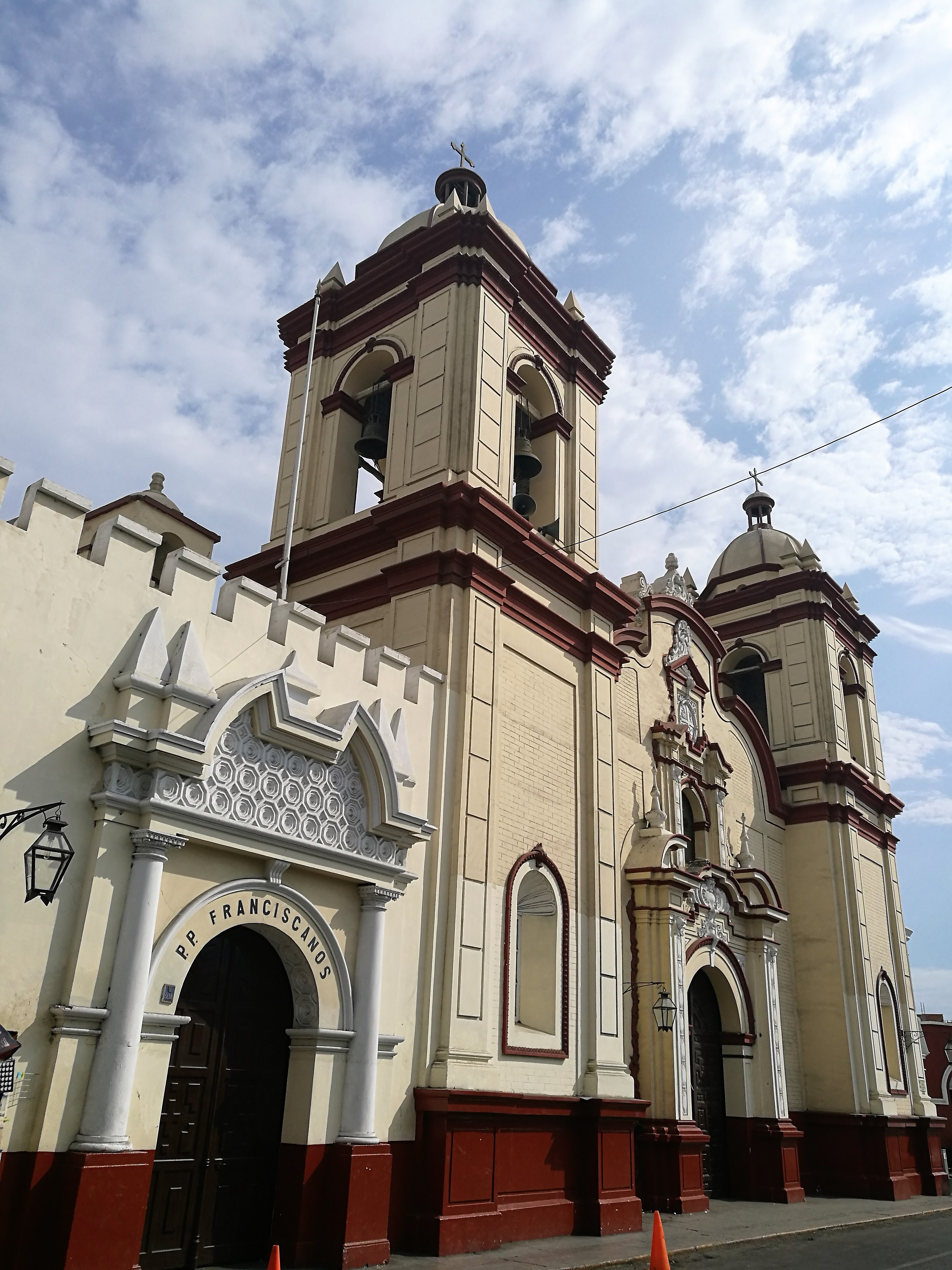
Church of San Agustín

In the city the predominant religion is Christianity, inherited from the Spanish culture since colonial era. In this topic there are different congregations that profess the Christian faith as the Catholic Church, Jehovah's Witnesses, The Church of Jesus Christ of Latter-day Saints (LDS Church), the Pentecostal Church, etc. All these Christian congregations have their temples in different parts of the city. In the historical center of Trujillo dominates the existence of temples of the Catholic Church such as the cathedral city located in the Plaza de Armas of Trujillo. One of the most representative events of Christianity in the city organized by the Catholic Church each year is Corpus Christi which gathers a large number of Christians in the Plaza Mayor of the city. About the Catholicism is the predominant Church in the districts that make up the city, according to census data in 2007. In the city, 76.9% of the population over 12 years is Catholic, 15.1% is Protestant, 3.9% other churches, and 4.1% is not linked to any church of a universe of 541,056 people.

== Economy ==
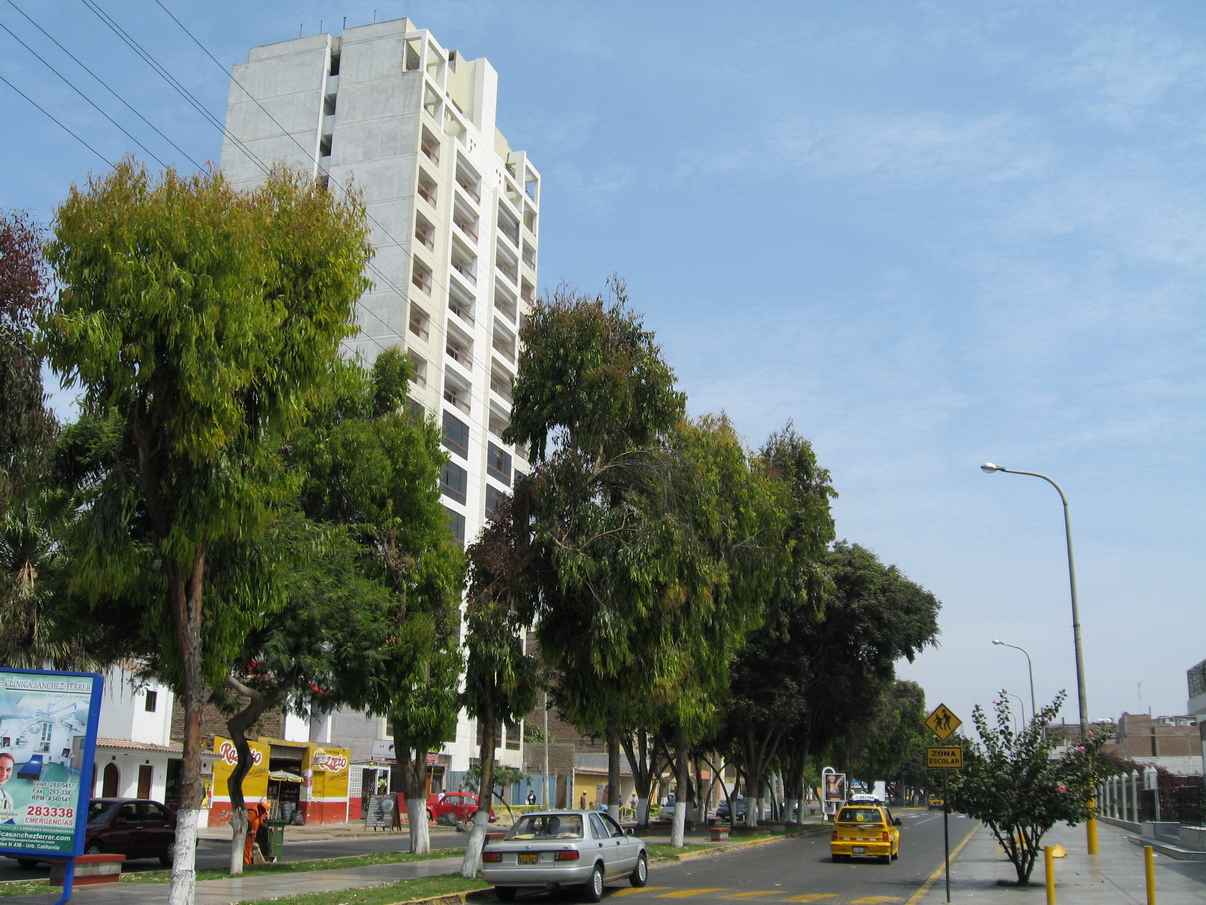
According to a Study of Urban Buildings Market, between 2006 and May 2012 construction activities in Trujillo grew 500%.

In the 19th century, the city of Trujillo greatly expanded due to extensive irrigated agriculture, with high production and profits from the sugarcane industry. Today, asparagus and shoes are some of the main products of its metropolitan area. The irrigated lands of the Moche River Valley produce sugarcane, rice, and asparagus. Industries in the city include the sugar refineries, knitting mills, breweries and the shoe industry. Among the internationally known products of Trujillo, asparagus is exported to neighboring countries, Europe and the United States. The areas around Trujillo are among the largest exporters of white asparagus in the world. Peru is the world's leading exporter of asparagus, followed by China and Mexico.

Trujillo is the most important economic center of northern Peru; it is an inland commercial and transport center for the surrounding farming areas. Its numerous shopping malls, supermarkets, department stores, and similar amenities make Trujillo a modern city.

In recent years another important economic sector in the city is the construction industry. According to statistical information provided by the "Institute of Construction and Development of the Peruvian Chamber of Construction" between 2006 and May 2012 construction activity in Trujillo grew by 500%. The study reveals that in 2006 were built 92770 m2 and the first months of 2012 the figure rose to 437440 m2, mainly due to the increased amount of square meters per house, likewise states that the total built in so far this year, 84% is housing construction.

=== Agro Industry ===
Trujillo is an agricultural, commercial and transport center due to production areas that account. The expansion of irrigated agriculture caused an expansive growth in the city, especially agribusiness sugar cane, which had as its ultimate expression in the Agricultural Cooperative Sugar Casa Grande (Casa Grande today Agroindustirial Company SA).

Among its most popular products internationally, highlighting the studs that are exported mainly to neighboring countries, USA, Europe. The momentum that has been taking the "Special Project Chavimochic" which includes the irrigation of the valleys of Chao, Viru, Moche, and later will include Chicama, has managed the successful export of many agricultural and agroindustrial products, which include artichokes, peppers, avocado, mango, etc.

==== Chavimochic ====
Chavimochic Special Project is a work of hydraulic engineering, this irrigation system extends throughout much of the coast of the La Libertad Region, on the north coast of Peru, it is designed to irrigate the valleys of Chao, Viru, Moche and Chicama. In 2012 It is already advanced up to its second stage in Moche valley.

=== Leather and footwear ===
It consists of the shoe makers and other leather products. It is classified within the manufacturing sector and is composed of micro and small enterprises, characterized by abundant labor demand and intermediate goods. Formally registered in 1300 small and medium enterprises (SMEs), which provide a significant 11% to the sector. They have achieved to sell their products domestically and characterize Trujillo as a shoe manufacturer city. Has the distinction of having formed a business cluster that provides its own dynamic of production and marketing. Spatially, 53% of SMEs are located in the district of El Porvenir. Trujillo concentrates 24% of the activity, and finally La Esperanza and Florencia de Mora concentrated 10% each. Tanning SMEs are preferentially located in the bottom of La Esperanza.

=== Commerce ===
The city has the largest commercial activity in the region motivated mainly by agribusiness, footwear industry, metal engineering, education, etc. Some of the main retail centers in the city are:

- Real Plaza
- Mall Aventura Plaza
- Open Plaza Los Jardines
- Penta Mall Mansiche
- Boulevard Primavera
- El Virrey
- Zona Franca
- Apiat

=== Some brands of Trujillo city ===
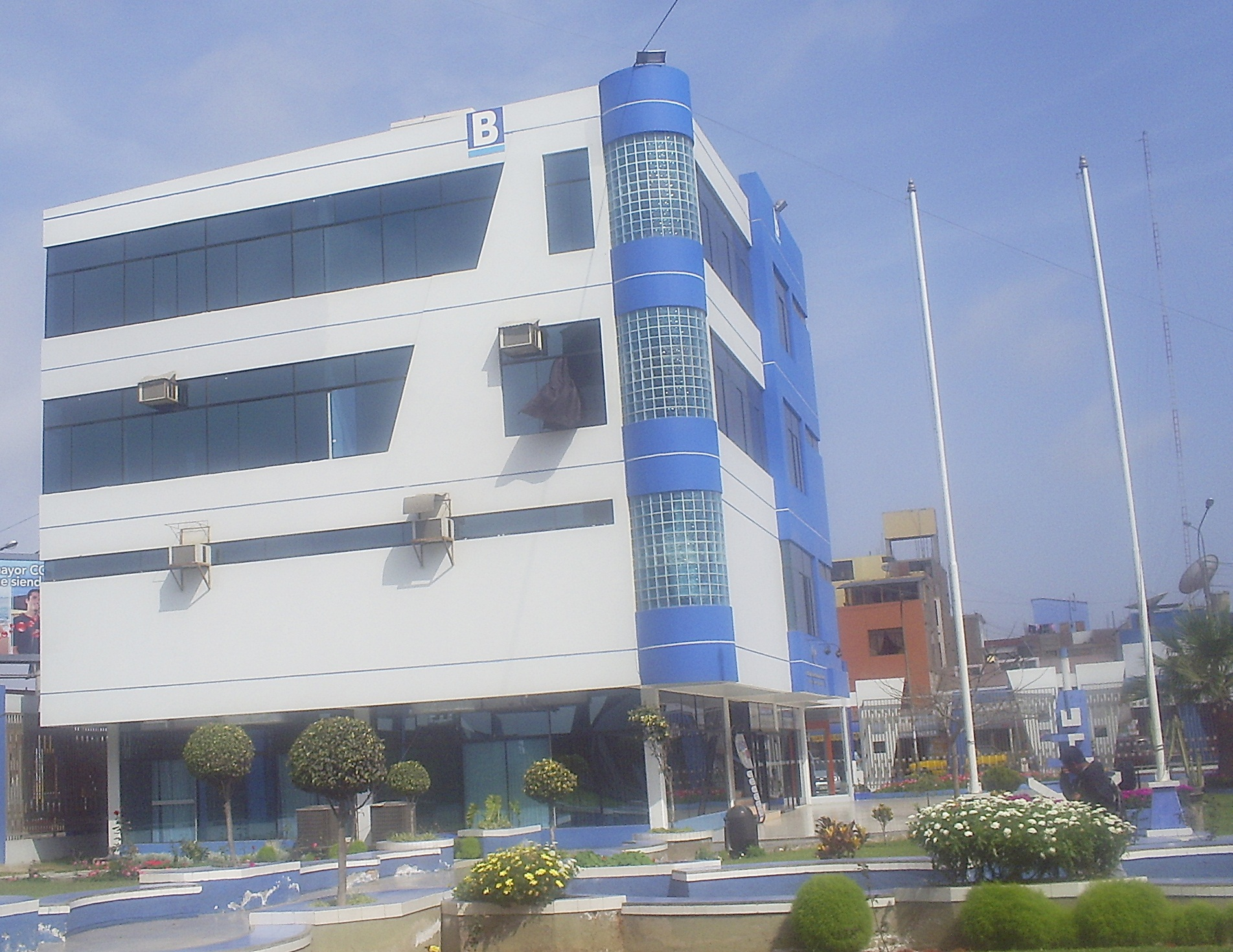
Admission office UCV, in Victor Larco district

According to a study published in 2010 by the magazine Peru Económico some of the most representative brands of Trujillo and that have regional impact are:

1. Trujillo, is a pilsener beer brand created in the beginnings of the 20th century. Later the company Backus and Johnston acquired the rights to this brand.
2. Cassinelli, is a trademark of beverages of the company Enrique Cassinelli and Sons SAC, who also manufactures the brand Liber.
3. Caja Trujillo, is a trademark of the largest financial company locally providing financial attention mainly to small and medium entrepreneurs in the SME sector.
4. Dulcería Castañeda, this is a traditional brand of candy with a product called "Alfajor Castañeda" before known as Alfajor de Trujillo.
5. UCV, it is the brand of the largest consortium of universities, the Cesar Vallejo University has its headquarters in Victor Larco district.

== Government ==
=== Regional government ===
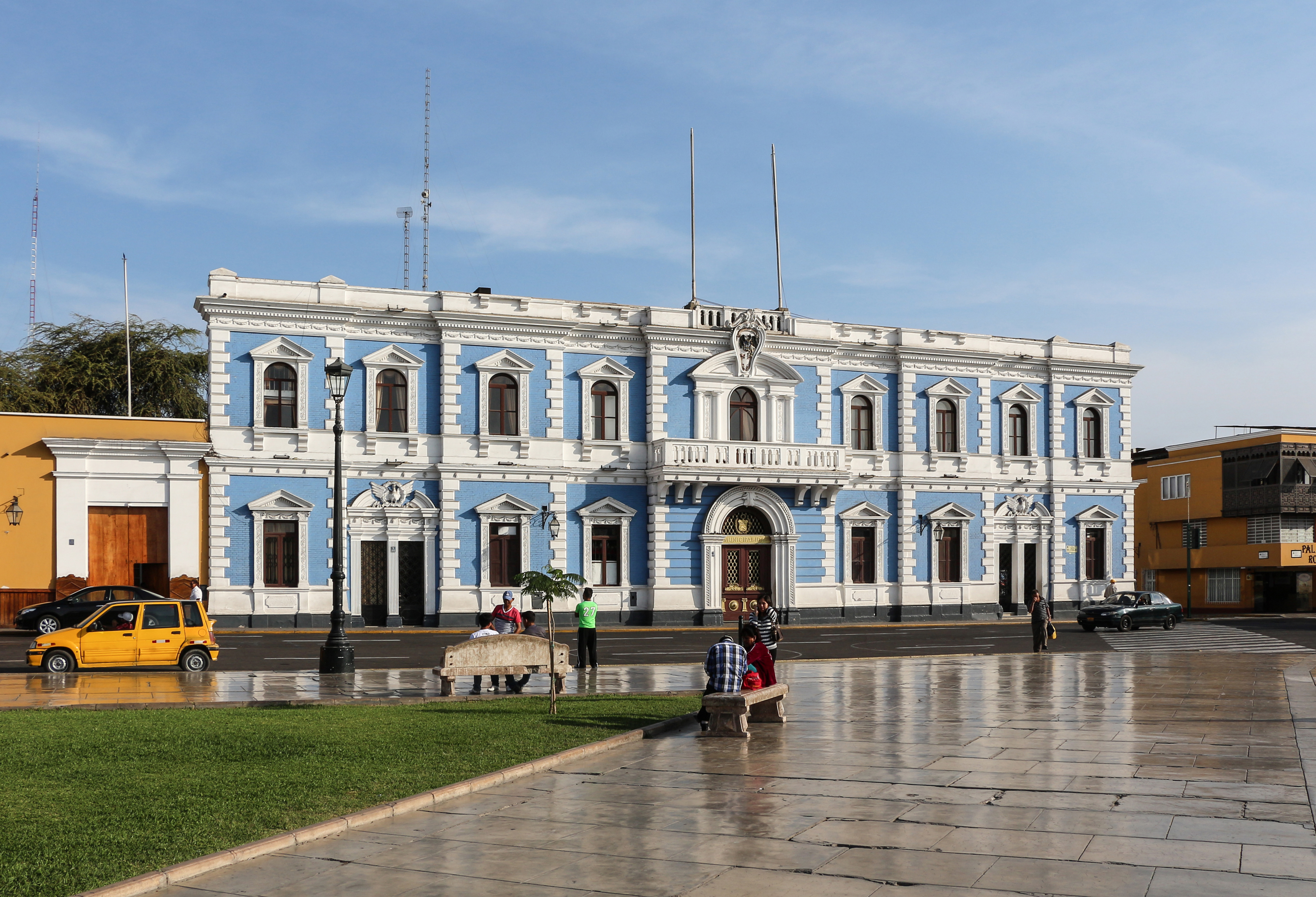
Trujillo City Hall

Trujillo is the capital of La Libertad region as such is the seat of regional government and its technical organs of government line as are the regional offices of the scope of its jurisdiction, so the regional policies of this government are deployed from this city for use in its territory corresponding. The city also hosts various regional directorates of the ministries that make up the country's public administration. Trujillo is also headquarters of the III-Territorial Police Directorate, as executing agency for the National Police of Peru.

=== Local government ===
The city, capital of La Libertad Region and the Province of Trujillo, is governed by the Provincial Municipality of Trujillo, which is governed by the provisions of the organic law of municipalities and that it has jurisdiction throughout the province. There is limited authority to the city and there is no governing body of the city itself, in that sense, the municipalities of the metropolitan districts that make up the city have jurisdiction in matters relating to their own districts.

=== Political system ===
The city is governed by a provincial mayor elected by popular vote every four years. The mayor is responsible for the municipal public administration and community, is the political representative of the municipality of the city and has political influences at the provincial level, so the guidelines of their policies are aimed primarily at the territorial level.

=== Judicial system ===
Trujillo is home to the Superior Court of La Libertad, that was the first Superior Court of Justice established in the country during the government of Simon Bolivar on March 26, 1824, under the name of Superior Court of North. Is the governing body of the Judicial District of La Libertad. According to Peru's judicial system. The city has the highest judicial burden of the region La Libertad.

== Tourism ==
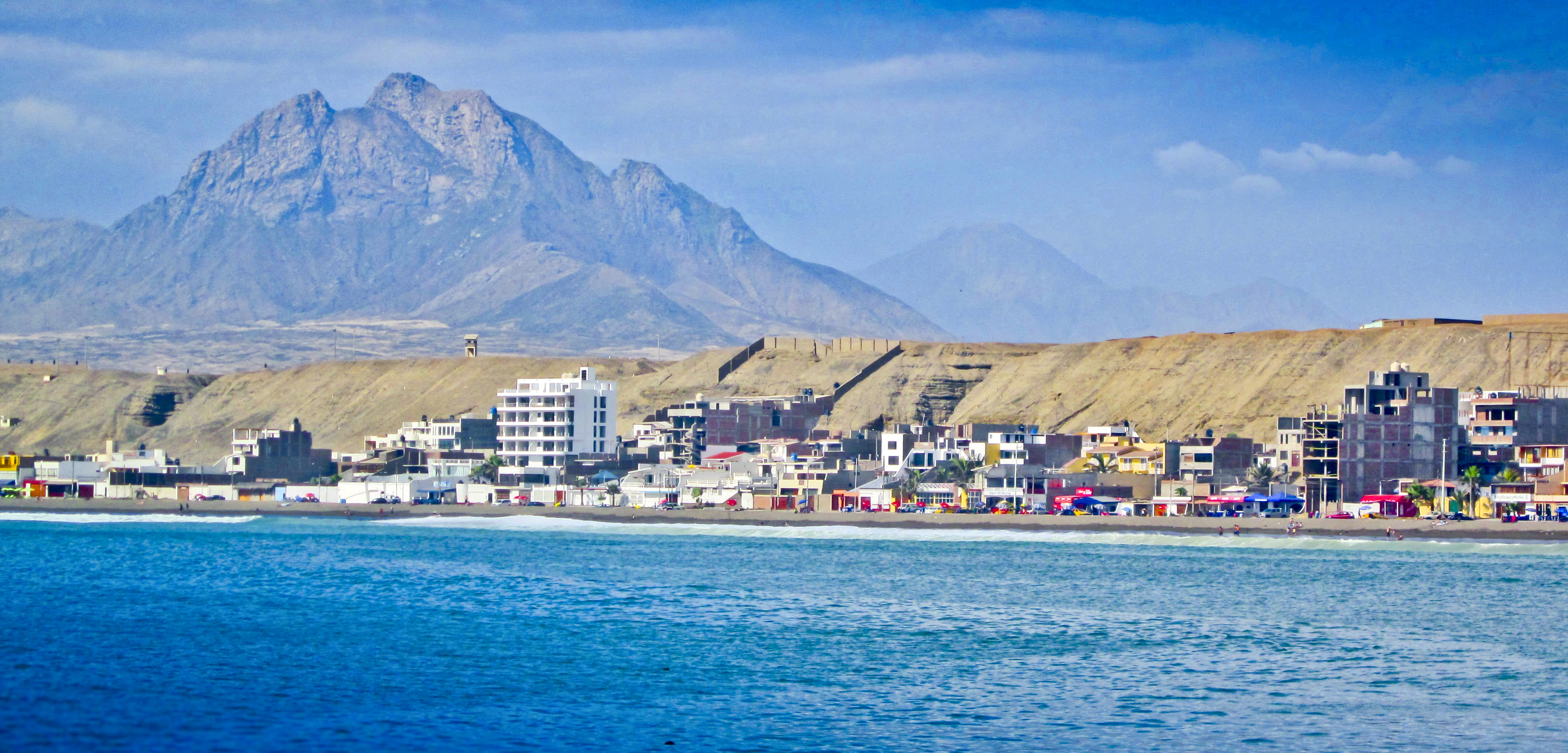
Huanchaco Beach, view of the sea with its typical caballitos de totora

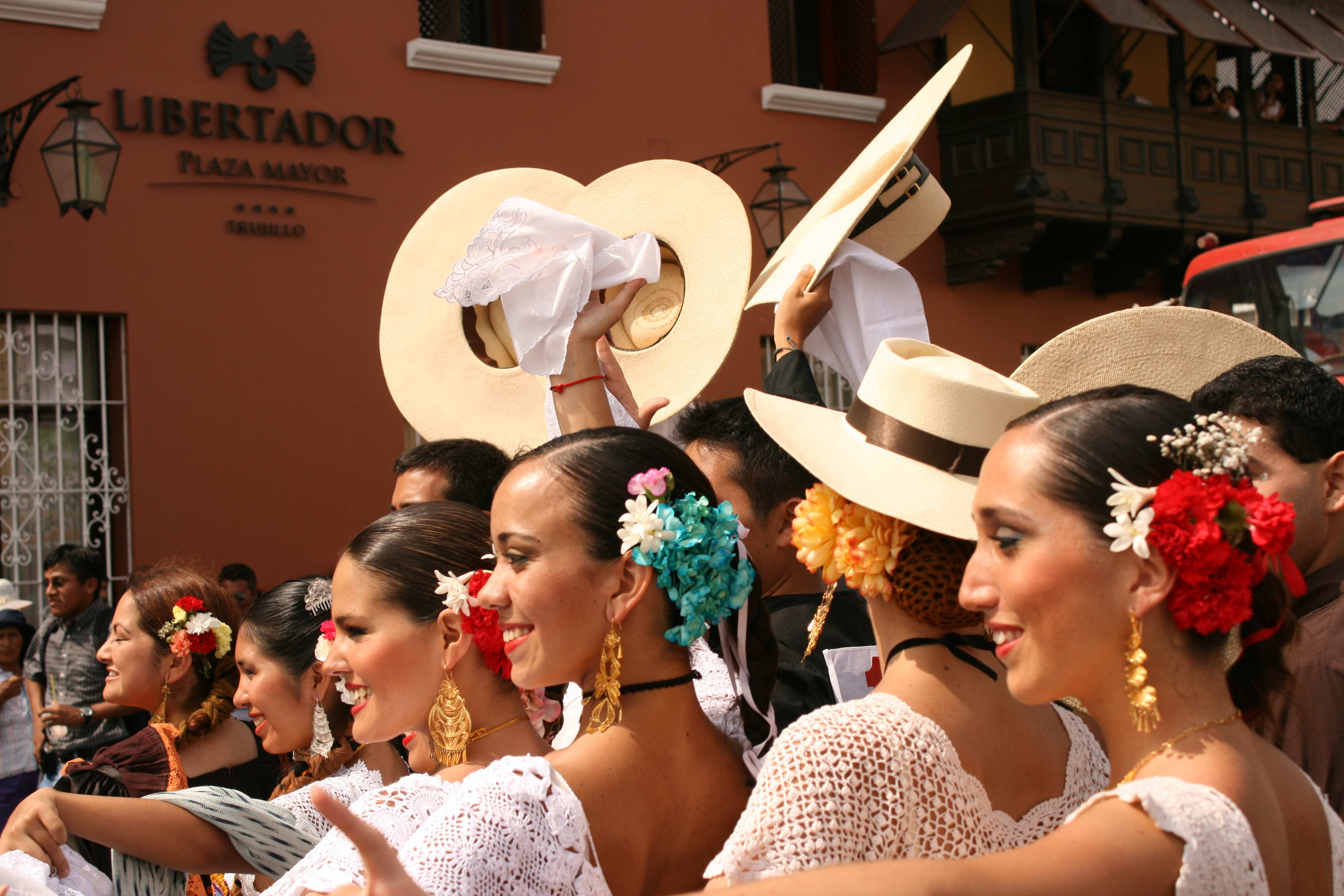
Marinera dancers in Trujillo festival, celebrated in January of every year

Tourism is a major industry in Trujillo due to the city's proximity to important sites where the Moche and Chimu civilizations evolved. These civilizations had highly skilled artisans, and many of their artifacts having been found during archaeological digs in the city. Nearby ruins include the Chimu adobe city of Chan Chan, the world's largest city built from that material. It is sometimes called Ciudad de la Luna (City of the Moon) because the people worshipped the moon; or de las Largas Murallas (of the Long Walls). In size and complexity, it has been compared with Teotihuacan in Mexico, and the ancient cities of Egypt. Other nearby ruins are the Moche ruins of Huaca del Sol, Huaca de la Luna, Huaca del Dragón o Arco Iris, Huaca Esmeralda and El Brujo.

Trujillo aspires to be designated a World Heritage Site, because of the proximity of both cultures and its historical colonial city centre, whose historic casonas (mansions) attract many visitors. The mansions and manors of Trujillo are distinguished for their solemn and austere façades. Inside, their halls are overflowing with ornaments.

Trujillo's wrought-iron window railings are a unique feature of the mansions. The House of Ganoza-Chopitea (casa Ganoza) has a polychromatic front in the baroque style, crowned by a rococo frontispiece and two lions. It is the city's most representative example of casonas architecture. Another is the House of Mayorazgo, which was built in the early years of the city and holds one of Peru's greatest numismatic collections. The revolutionary leader Simón Bolívar lived in a house on the Plaza de Armas.

Huanchaco beach, a surfing destination, is located just north of Trujillo.

Trujillo's restaurants offer a wide variety of local food, such as shambar, mostly served on Mondays; ceviche, sopa teologa and cabrito.

=== Moche Route ===
Currently the Moche Route is a tourist destination starting in what was formerly the seat of government of the Moche culture in the Temples of the Sun and the Moon, about 6 km (4 mi) south of the historic center of Trujillo. The route covers a number of places that were part of the dominions of the Moche kingdom during its heyday.

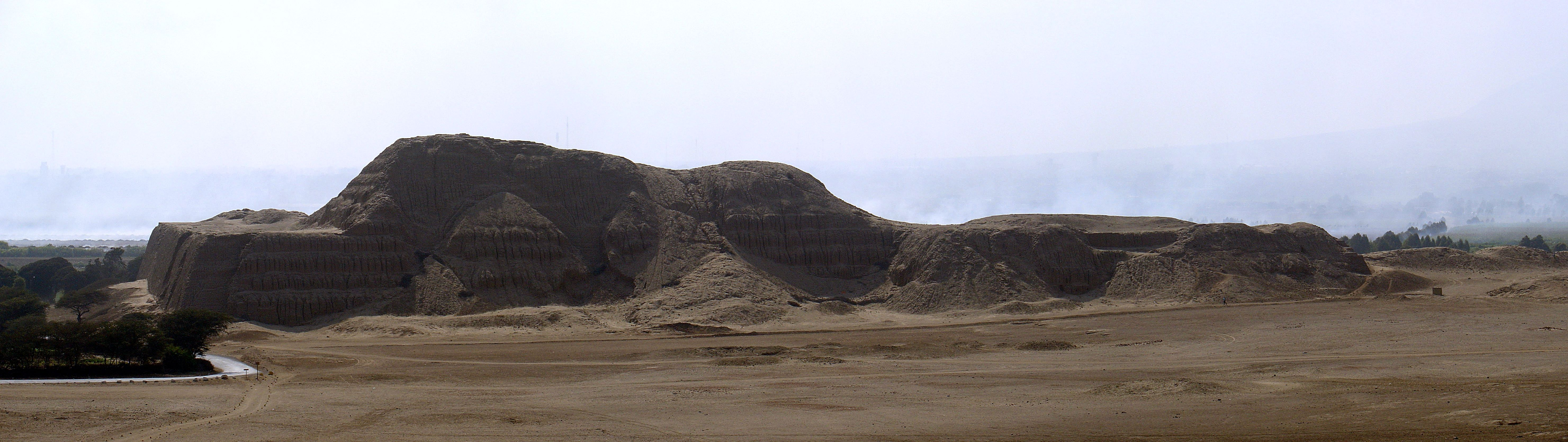
Panoramic view of the Archaeological site of Huaca del Sol (Temple of the sun), Mochica political capital, south of Trujillo city

=== Tourist attractions ===
==== The historic centre of Trujillo ====
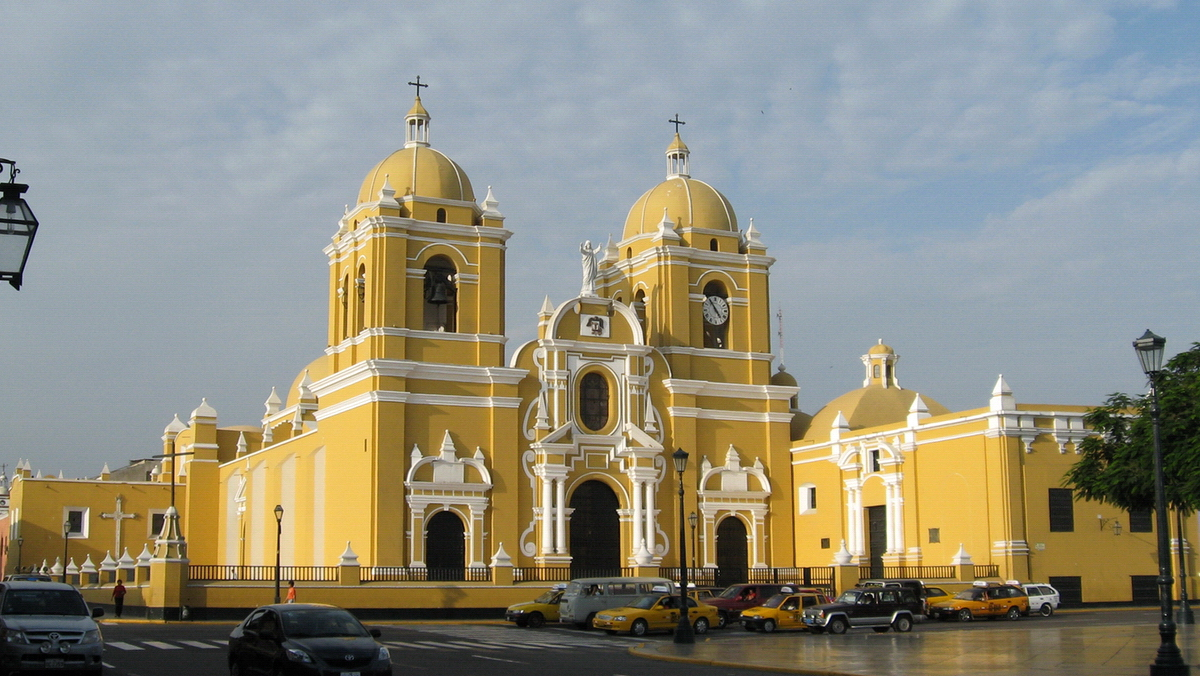
View of the cathedral of Trujillo city

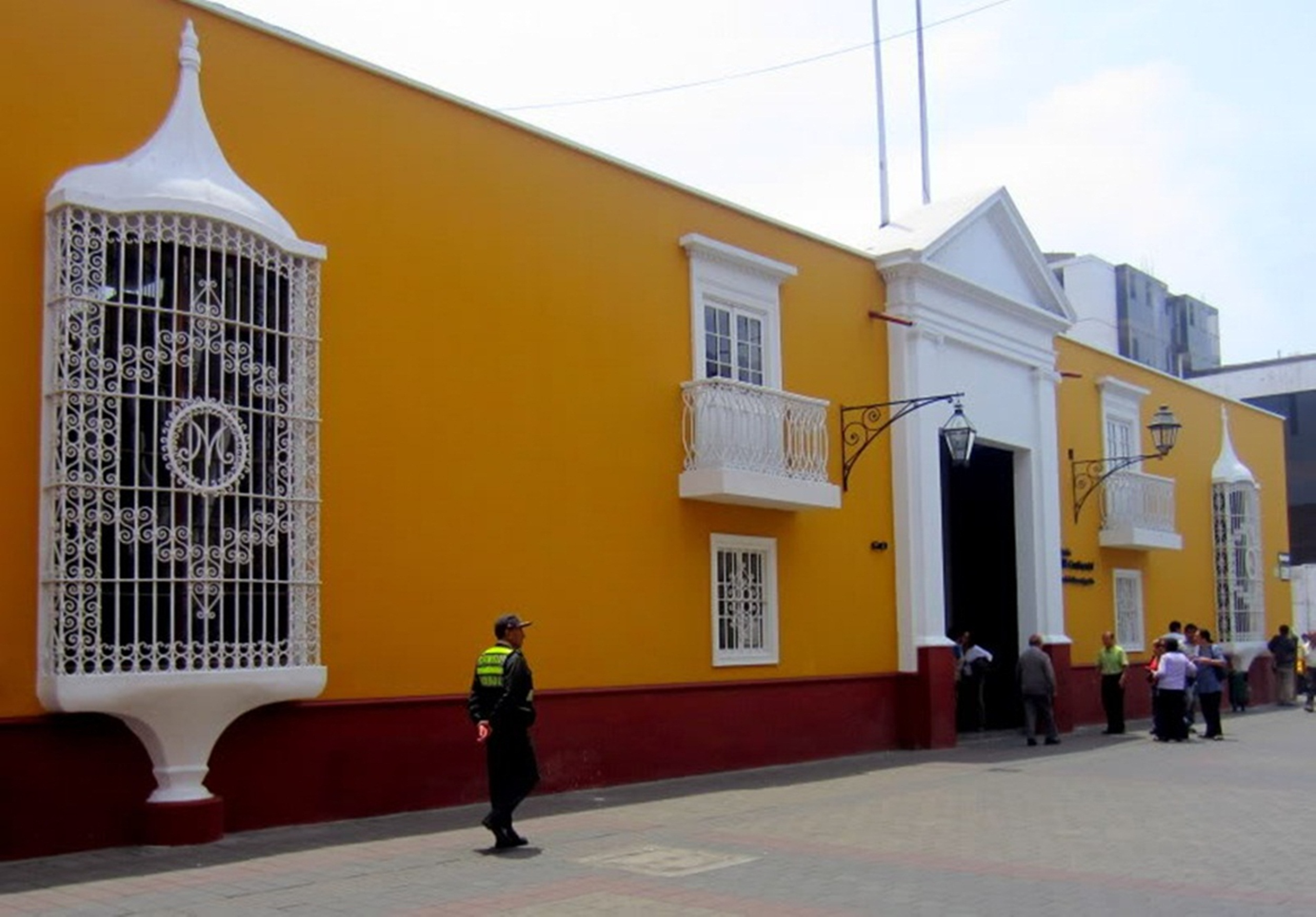
It is considered a "Civic sanctuary" of the city "The House of the Emancipation", where Torre Tagle conceived the Independence of Trujillo on December 29, 1820. It hosted the Constitutional Congress and the Government Palace with Riva Agüero. Located in one of the corners formed by the streets Pizarro and Gamarra of Historic Centre of Trujillo, currently houses cultural exhibitions and a museum.

The historic centre of Trujillo occupies an area of 133.5ha and consists of a total of 1.783 lots, grouped in 72 blocks are located within the area that was known as the "Fence Trujillo," and was originally defined by the wall of the ciudad. Currently the historic center of Trujillo is bordered by the España Avenue, it may find many buildings dating from the colonial and republican periods, between attractions offered by the historic center of Trujillo we have the following:

- Plaza de Armas (main square), is surrounded by the cathedral, colonial mansions and Republican harmonious. In the center stands the Freedom Monument, which represents the process of independence. The statue was made in France, the materials used are marble and copper, the sculptor was Edmund Moeller.
- The Cathedral, built between 1647 and 1666, their altars are Baroque and Rococo style, preserved the paintings belong to the Cuzco school of painting and Quito school. The cathedral has the Cathedral Museum with mostly religious works of the colonial era gold and silver.
- Casa del Mayorazgo or Casa Tinoco (House Tinoco), built in the 16th century by the owners of the first sugar factory of Facalá. There he designed the first flag of independence in 1820, is located on a corner of Pizarro and Bolognesi streets. The main entrance is located on the Pizarro Jr. 314.
- Casa Calonge or Urquiaga, built in a neoclassical style, between the 18th and 19th centuries, Simon Bolivar stayed in this house, from which organized much of his campaign and issued decrees declaring emancipation Trujillo Capital of the Republic of Peru and creating the Superior Court of Justice. You can see the desk used by Bolivar, gold ornaments of the Chimu culture, as well as period furniture.
- Casa Ganoza, for its architecture, the house is very representative of Trujillo. The house is known for the cover of the lions as its Baroque is crowned by a pediment Rococo and two lions.
- Casa of Emancipation, This house served as headquarters of the First Constitutional Congress and government house of former President Jose de la Riva Agüero.
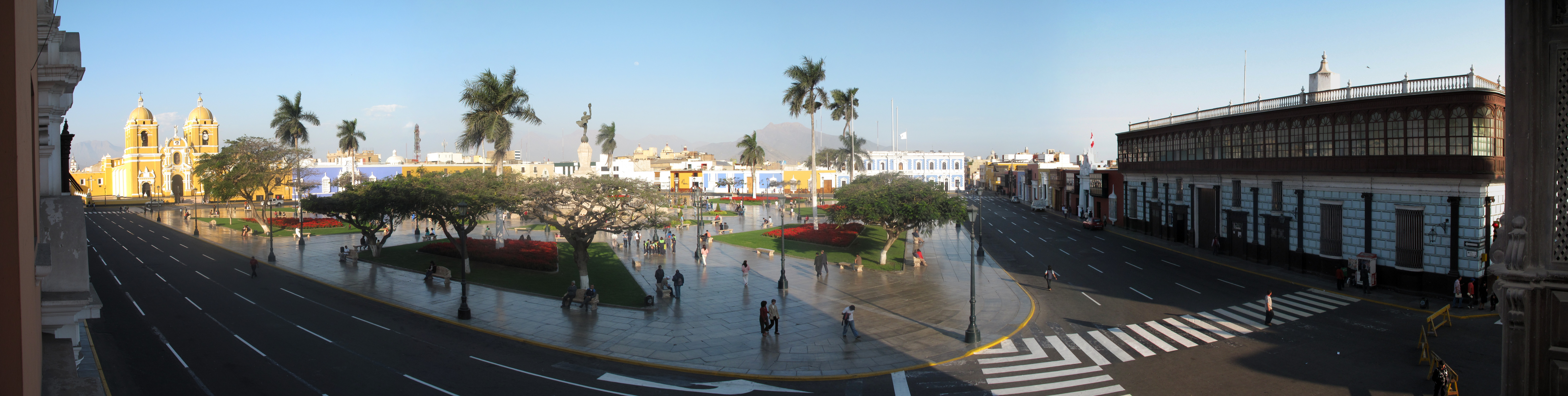
Panoramic view of the historic Plaza de Armas of Trujillo, the left is the Cathedral of the city

==== Archaeological sites ====
- Chan Chan

The largest Pre-Columbian city in the Americas, was built by the Chimu, is located north of the city of Trujillo and is one of the most impressive places of Peru, UNESCO declared Chan Chan World Heritage Site in 1986.
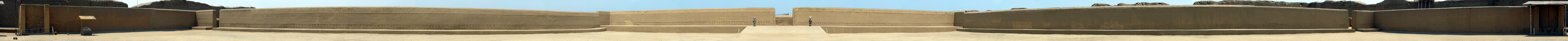
Chan Chan, capital of kingdom Chimu

- The Temples of the Sun and Moon

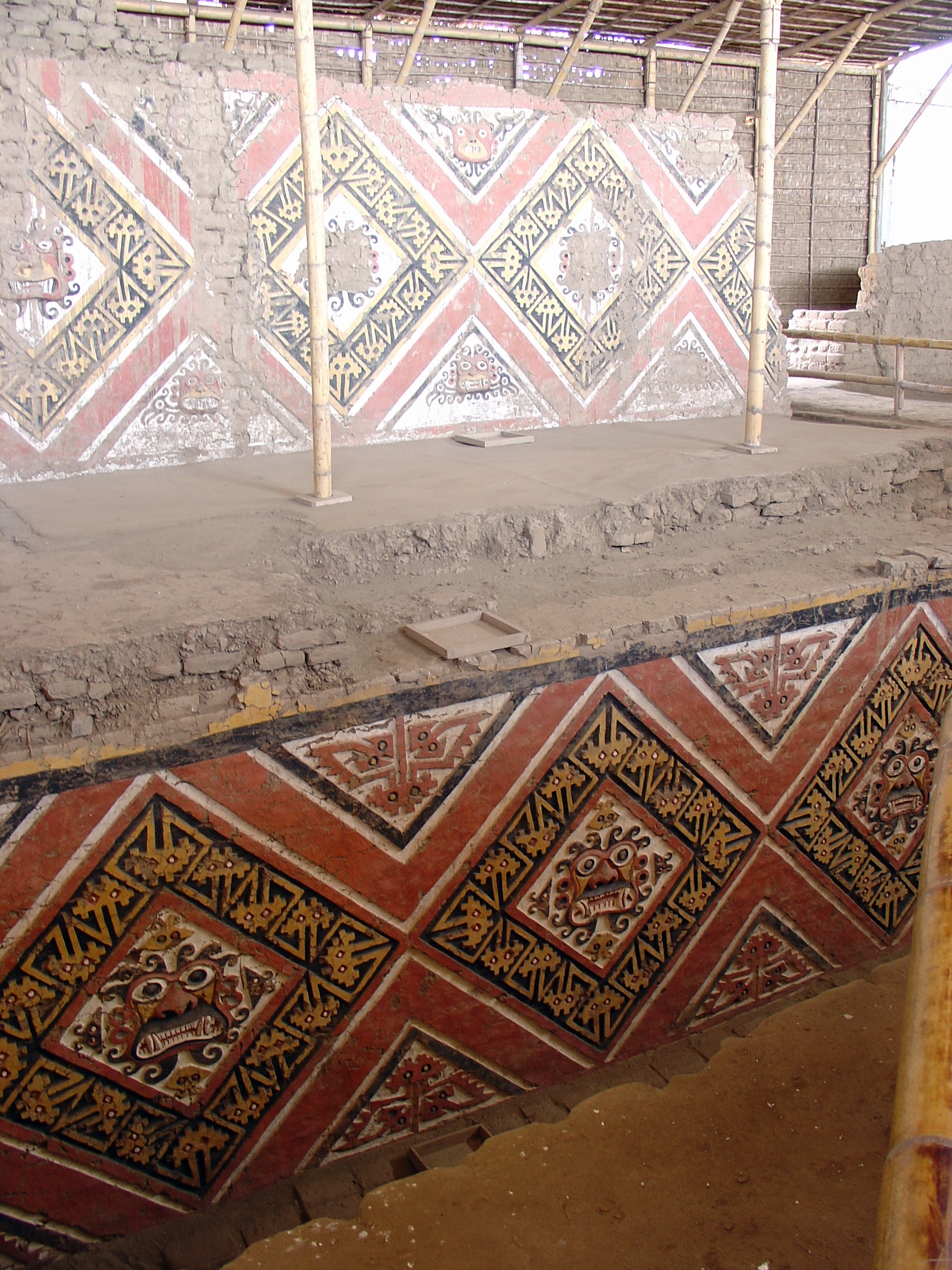
Huaca de la Luna, mochica temple, decorated wall: painted bas-reliefs

The Temples of the Sun and Moon are monuments of Peru, located about five kilometres (3.1 miles) south of Trujillo in the Moche district. This archaeological site represented physically the capital of the Mochica culture from the 1st century AD until the 9th century, the museum is next to one of the most visited places in the northern city of Trujillo. The Temple of the Moon or Huaca de la Luna has been considered as a religious center of the mochicas.

- Huaca Esmeralda

Located three blocks from the temple of Mansiche, urbanization La Esmeralda. The temple is a rectangular building about 65 by 41 metres (213 by 135 feet). Consists of two platforms. The first, located at the entrance, is the last stage of construction Chimu, the decor is fishing nets with fish inside. Behind the second platform and the oldest is similar to the Tschudi Palace decorated with designs of the network and the sea otter.

- Huaca del Dragón

The Huaca del Dragon or as also called, Huaca del Arco Iris is located in the north, in the District of La Esperanza and near Chan Chan. This is a large religious monument, administrative and ceremonial center built in adobe, whose murals are decorated with friezes in relief showing stylized human figures and representing the rainbow.

- Huaca Takaynamo, it is located in La Esperanza district.

=== Caballito de totora ===
The manufacturing of ships called Caballito de totora is a tradition in Huanchaco beach. These are used for fishermen in their work and also for navigation of the tourists as a distraction adventure.

==== Nearby places ====
- Huanchaco Beach

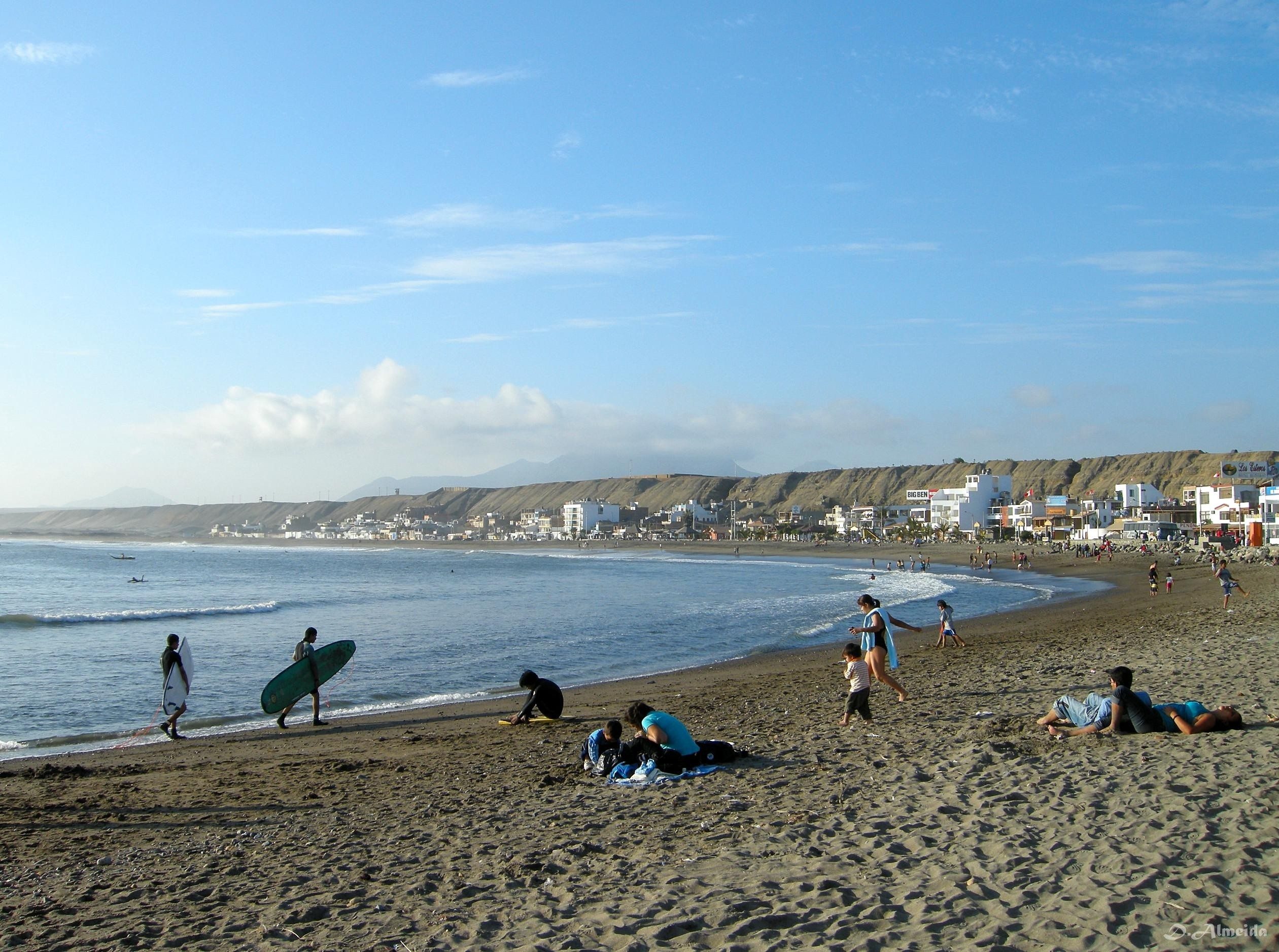
Huanchaco beach

Huanchaco is considered a World Surfing Reserve and It is located in Huanchaco District; It is a traditional tourist resort of Trujillo, one can see the rafts called horses of totora used since the time of the Chimu for fishing activities. It also highlights the fishing harbor, icon representing the place. Huanchaco is known for being a surfer's "dream spot" and for its caballitos de totora. The most famous and original food here is the ceviche.

- Countryside of Moche

The district of Moche, is traversed by the Moche River and is home to the Temples of the Sun and the Moon, that were the capital of the Moche culture, countryside centers are also where you can taste typical dishes like soup theologian, in the Moche countryside are located traditional Trujillo restaurants of the "Mochica"; honorable mention deserves the Moche urban area with its main square. The countryside is rich in tradition and history.

- Lake Conache

Lake Conache is located within a large nature reserve in the village of Conache, in the district of Laredo, has an approximate area of 9 hectares is close to the Pampas de San Juan, jurisdiction of Santo Domingo, Laredo. The big dunes that are around it, are ideal for sandboarding very close to the lagoon is a forest of carob.

- Countryside of Simbal, It is located in Simbal District.
- El Brujo, is an Archaeological Complex located about 45 km north of Trujillo, is an ancient monument of the Moche culture. It includes Huaca Prieta (from preceramic times and later extended by the Cupisnique culture) and the nearby colonial remains of Salinar, Moche, Lambayeque, Chimú. Huaca El Brujo (or Cortada/Partida) and Huaca Cao Viejo (or Huaca Blanca) were built by the Moche sometime between 1 and 600 AD. Huaca Cao Viejo is known for its polychrome reliefs and mural paintings, and the discovery of the Dama de Cao, the first known Governess in Peru.

== Culture ==
Trujillo has always been the capital of a region whose cultural traditions date back to at least twelve thousand years old. The existing archaeological sites like the Temple of the Sun and Moon and the city of Chan Chan demonstrate the city's vocation of cultural capital. Trujillo now emerges as a cultural capital, service center, and equipment, with its universities, schools, and basic technology, they are developing a comprehensive capital and a base for sustained innovations for development.

=== Education ===
==== Primary and secondary school ====
The city has more than 833 schools, 83% of schools are concentrated in urban continuum, corresponding to 50% to the district of Trujillo. The concentration of educational institutions in the district of Trujillo is primarily for the secondary level (53%) where there is a greater presence of the private sector. The expansion of state educational infrastructure and increasing participation of the private sector in education has allowed progress in educational coverage ciudad. Some primary and secondary schools most representative of the city of Trujillo are:

- National College San Juan of Trujillo, in this school in 1915 the poet César Vallejo he taught first grade to novelist Ciro Alegría.
- Seminary College San Carlos and San Marcelo, has over 386 years of formative presence in the region, provides educational services in primary and secondary levels of males. It is considered a historic school in the country by resolution number 018-2011-ED. This school was founded on November 4, 1625, by trujillan bishop Carlos Marcelo Corne.
- Great Unity School José Faustino Sánchez Carrión, is considered one of the landmarks of the city schools.
- College Santa Rosa, located in the historic center of the city.
- College Rafael Narvaez Cadenillas, is a pilot school, part of the School of Education and Communication Sciences of the National University of Trujillo. It was founded in 1992 and located in local spaces of the UNT campus.
- Modelo College is one of the flagship schools of Trujillo. It is located on the corner of Spain and El Ejército avenues facing the Plaza Bolognesi.
- Max Ludwig Planck (School)

==== Universities ====
National University of Trujillo

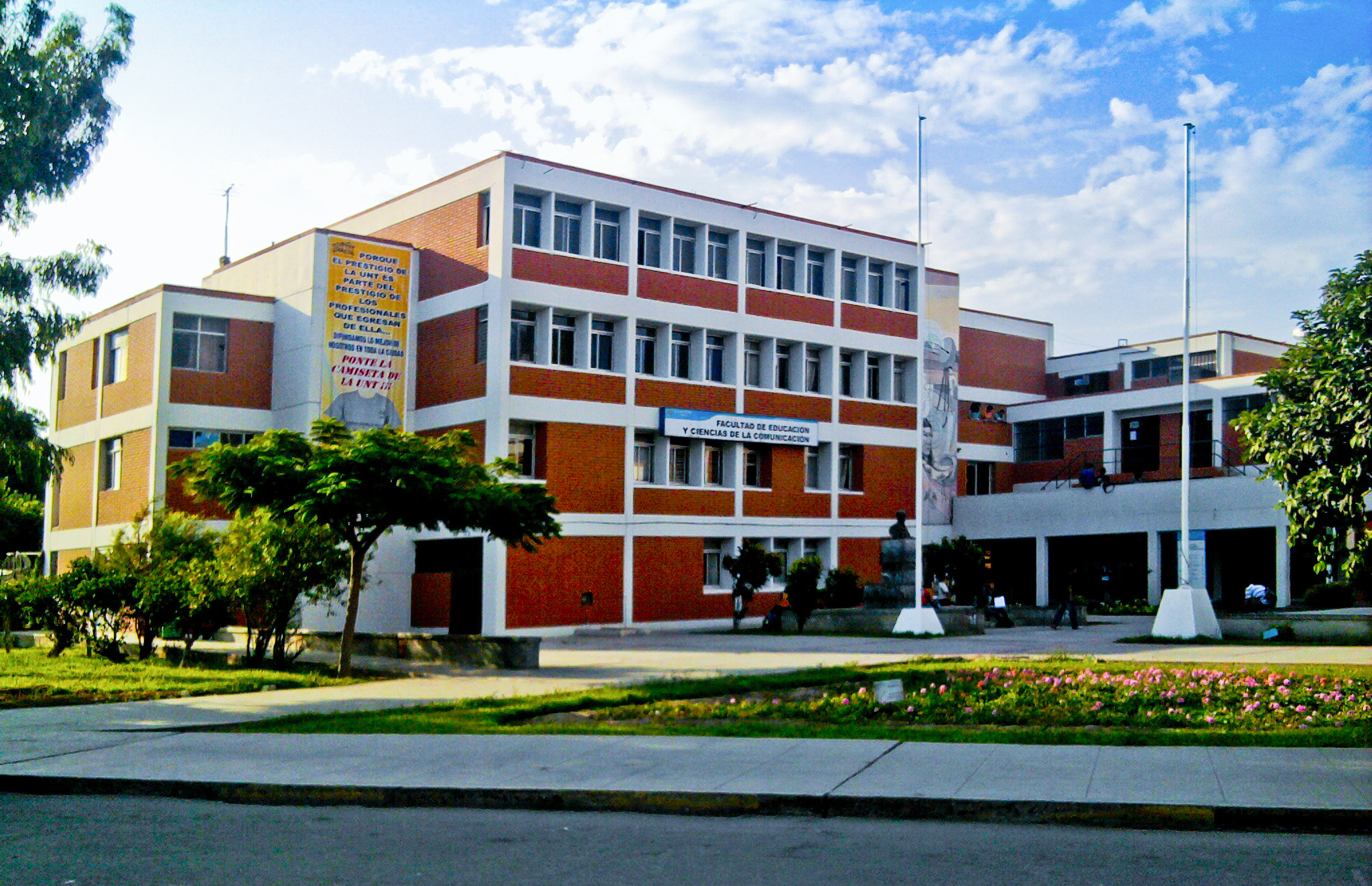
The National University of Trujillo was the first republican university founded in Peru

Trujillo is home to many higher education institutions, including the majority of the universities and vocational institutes in northern Peru. The most recognized universities are the National University of Trujillo, one of the most important universities in Peru, which was created on May 10, 1824, by Simon Bolivar and from their classrooms graduated poets: César Vallejo who was one of the leading representatives of the North Group, Alejandro Romualdo, political philosophers: Antenor Orrego, political ideologues: Víctor Raúl Haya de la Torre (APRA), Luciano Castillo (Socialist Party of Peru), economists Luis Alva, Pacific Huaman, Cesar Liza, Jaime Verastegui, writers: Ciro Alegría, Eduardo Gonzalez Viaña.

People related with National University of Trujillo (UNT)
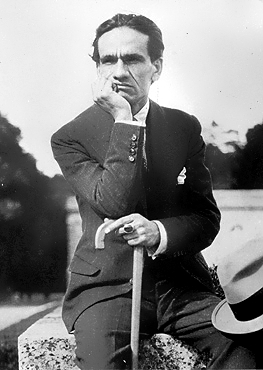
Poet Cesar Vallejo
called by Thomas Merton "the greatest universal poet since Dante", studied at National University of Trujillo

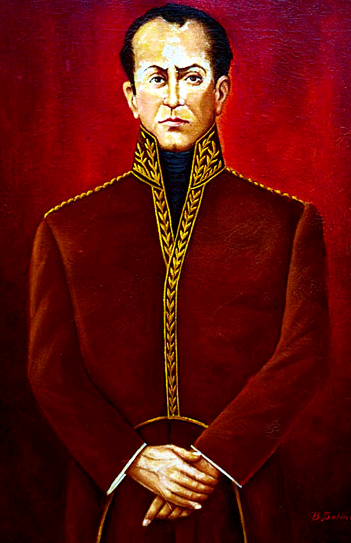
José Faustino Sánchez Carrión
considered by congress of his country the founder of Peruvian Republic, he also founded with Simon Bolivar the National University of Trujillo on May 10, 1824

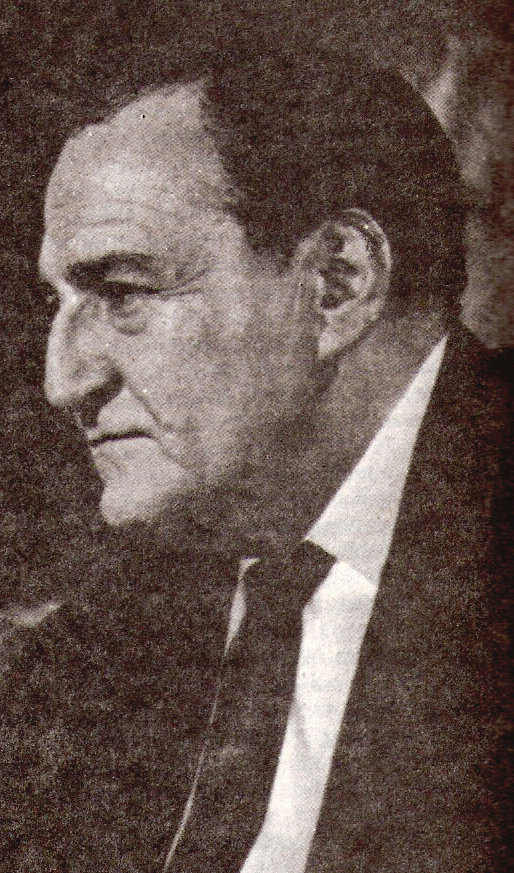
Víctor Raúl Haya de la Torre
He is considered the most important Peruvian political leader of the 20th century, studied literature at UNT

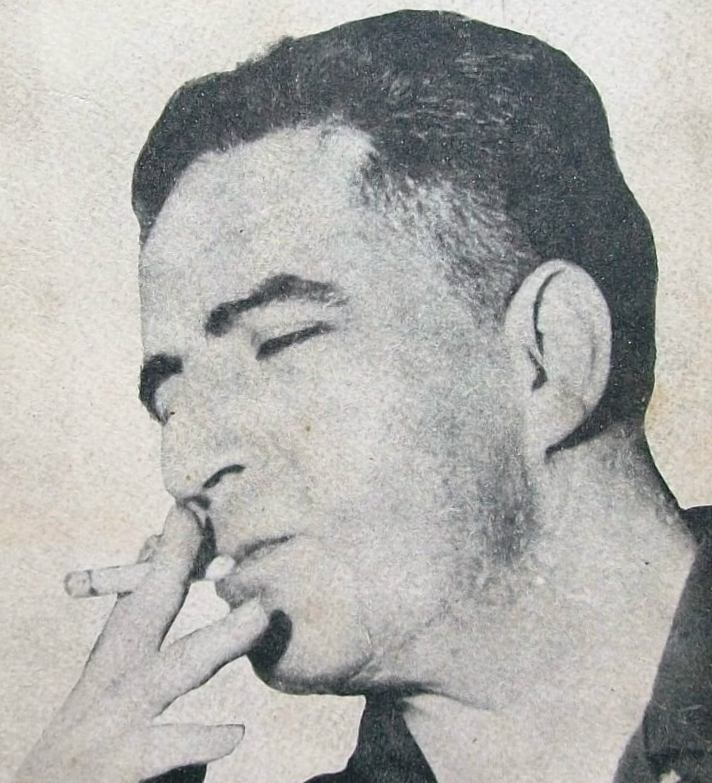
Ciro Alegría
journalist, politician, and novelist

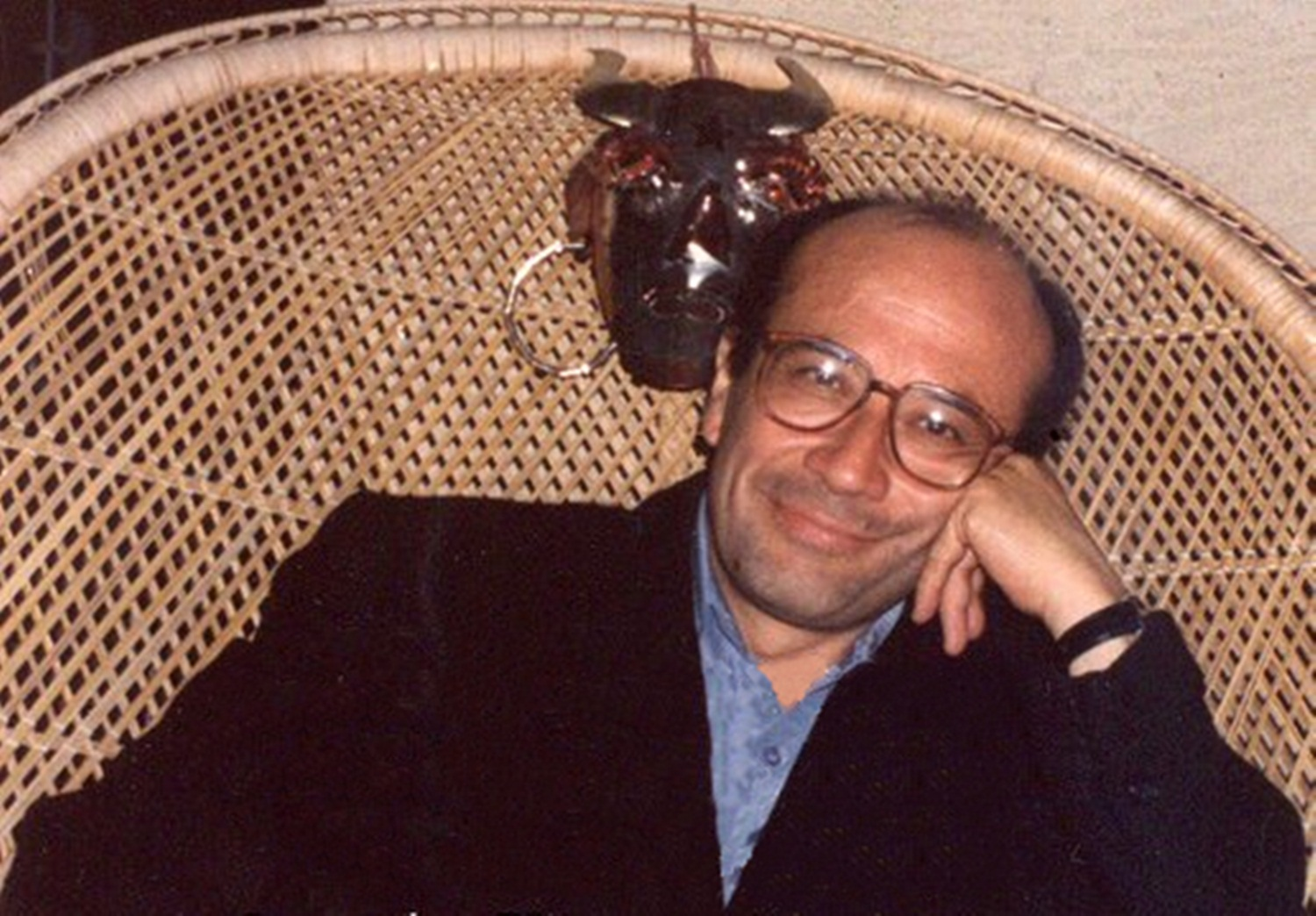
Eduardo González Viaña
Studied laws at UNT, he's a direct successor of the North Group

Other well-known universities are Antenor Orrego Private University, Cesar Vallejo University, Catholic University of Trujillo, Private University of the North which belongs to Laureate International Universities (Laureate Education) being the one of two international universities in Peru, Private University of Trujillo, Leonardo Da Vinci University, Alas Peruanas University, the archdiocesan seminary, and some other regions universities established in the city.

The city also has the Regional Conservatory of Music "Carlos Valderrama" which has university status since 2011.

==== Other Tertiary Institutes ====
Among principal Institutes of Technology in the city are TECSUP, SENATI, SENCICO, Nueva Esperanza, Leonardo da Vinci and Institute of the North. Also in the city there is the School of Arts Macedonio de la Torre founded by the painter Pedro Azabache Bustamante.

=== Museums and Exhibition Halls ===
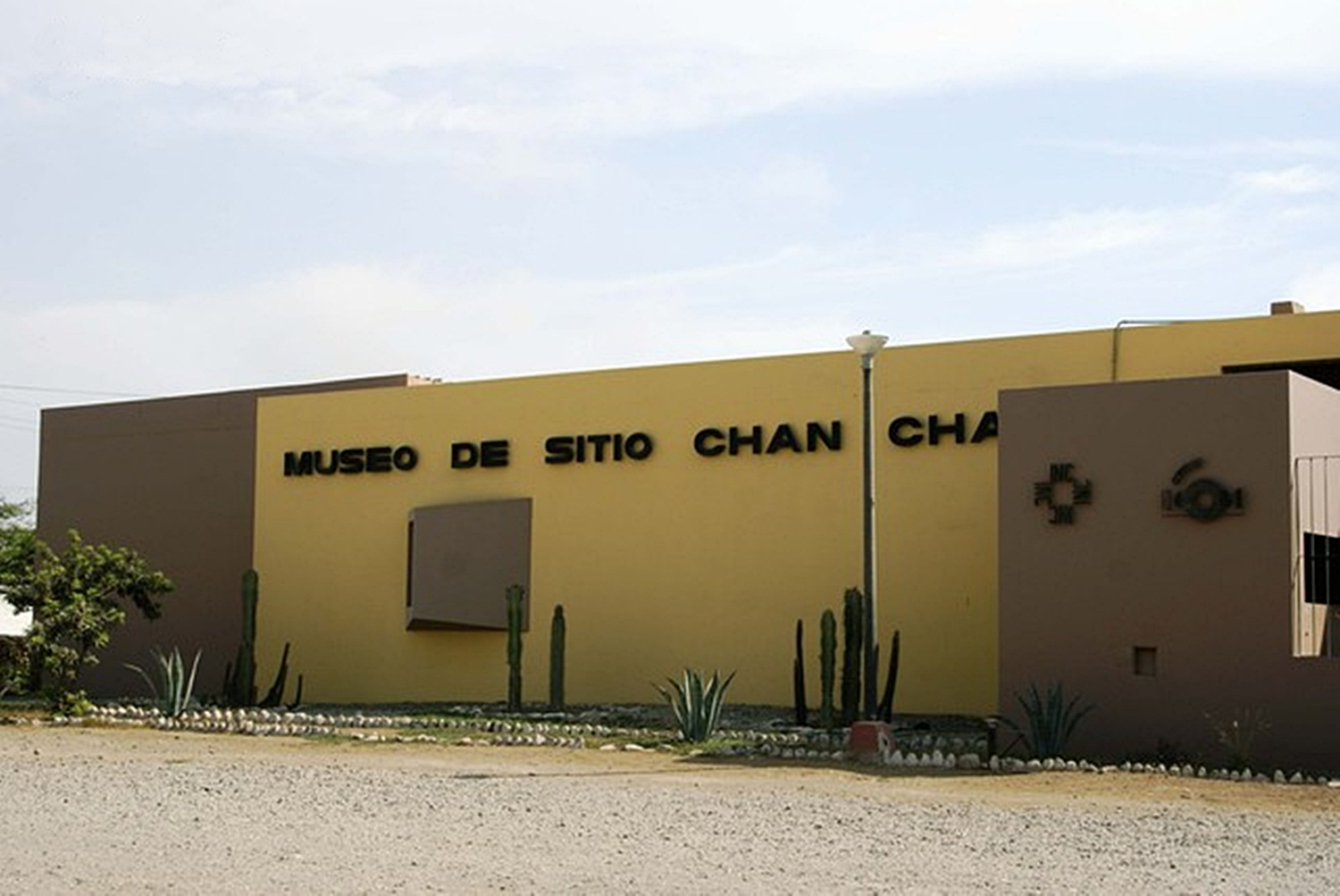
Museum of site in Chan Chan

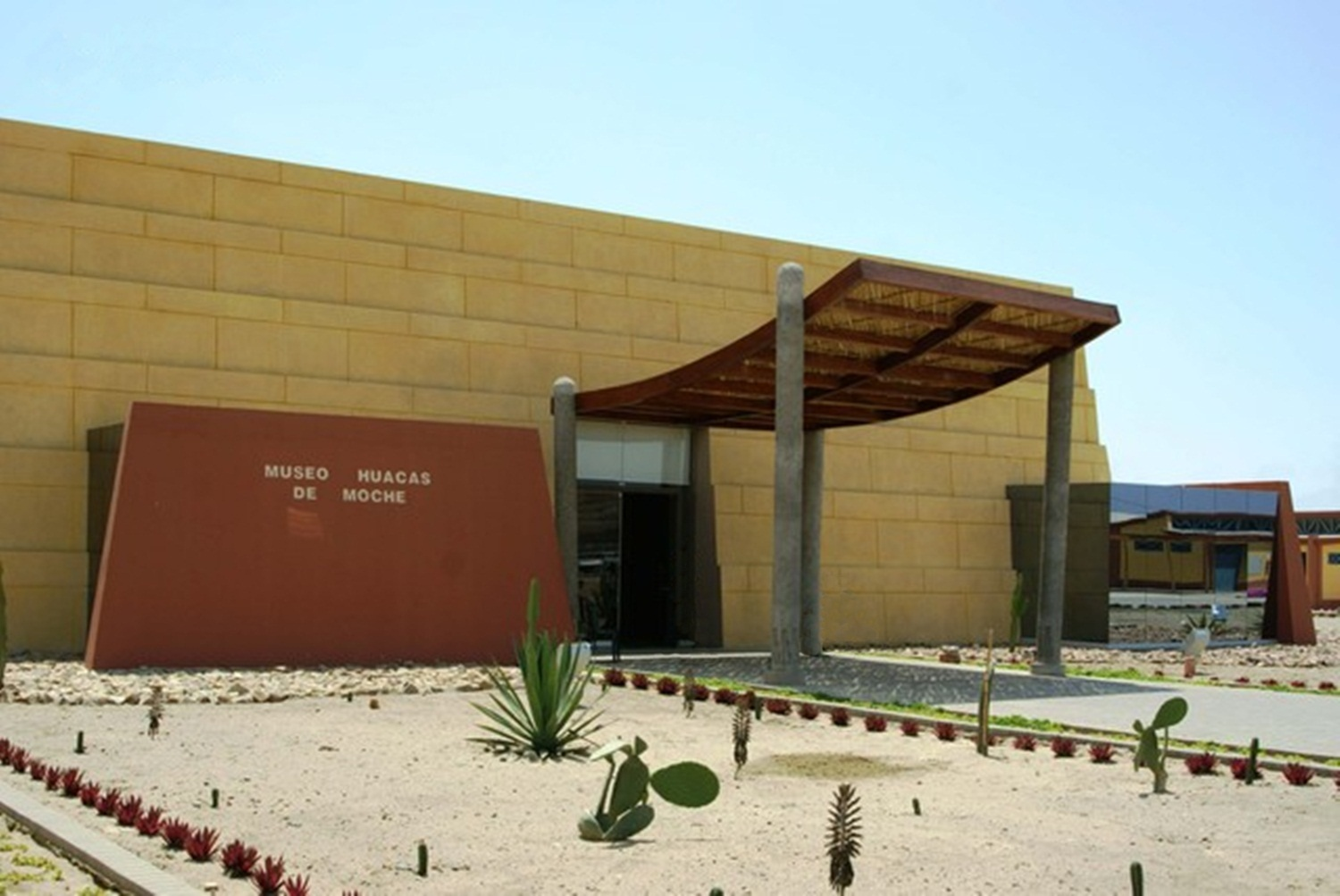
Museum of site in Huaca del Sol

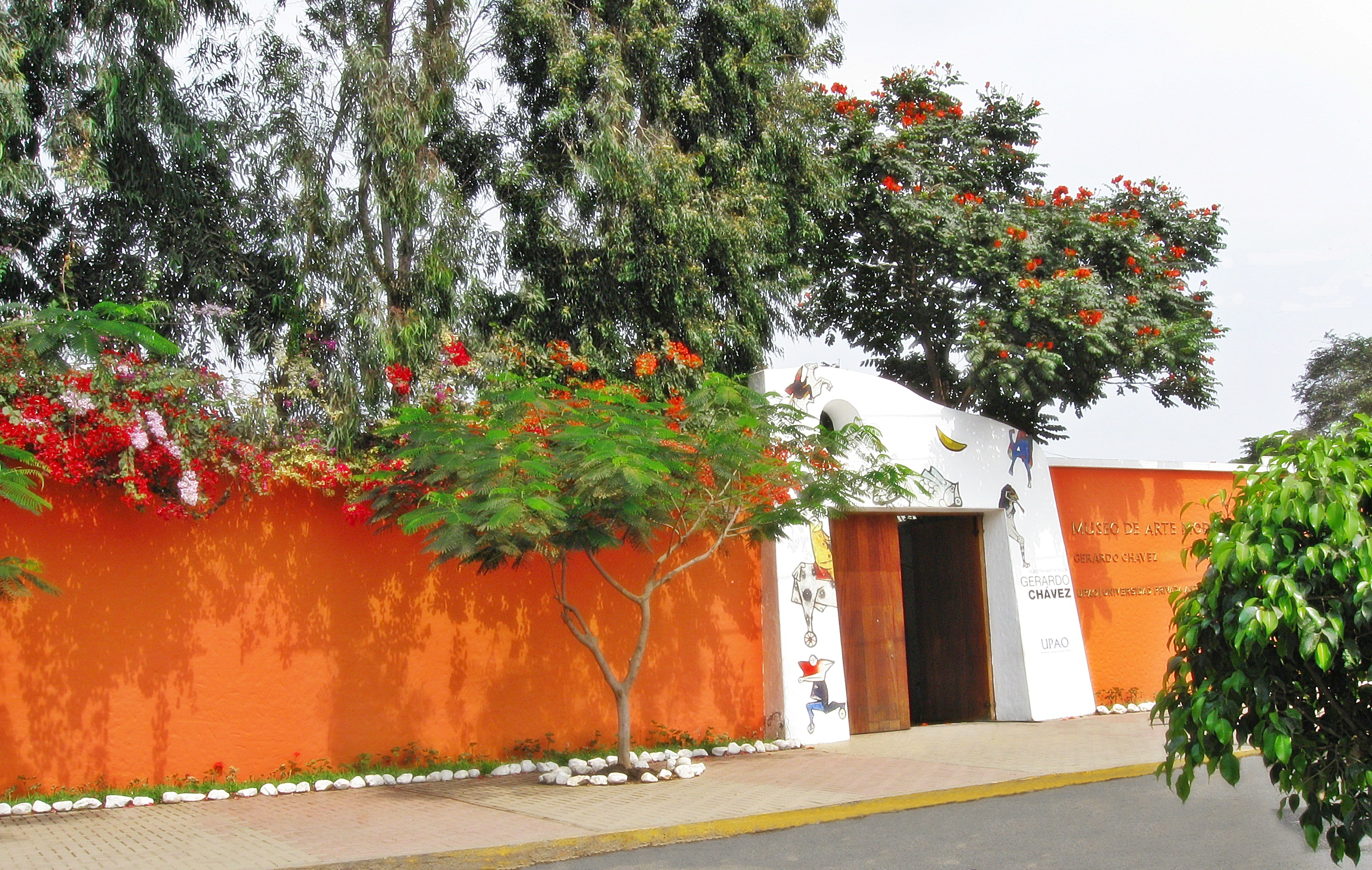
Museum of Modern art

- Museo del Juguete (Toy Museum)

Located a few blocks from the Plaza de Armas with its coffee bar, it is one of the most splendid of the city and unique in the country, owned by renowned painter Gerardo Chávez, here you can find toys to mid-20th-century.

- Museo de Arte Moderno (Museum of Modern Art)

Another museum belonging to the painter Gerardo Chávez, is located in the urbanization Semirustica El Bosque, the museum displays works of prominent artists, both national and foreign, and sculptures but also find a coffee bar and souvenir sales, is the first museum of modern art in Peru.

- Museo Casa de la Emancipación (Emancipation House Museum)

Is considered as a Civic Sanctuary of the city: here the Marquis Torre Tagle conceived the independence of Trujillo in 1820. Also here was Hosted the First Constitutional Congress and the Government Palace with Riva Agüero. Nowadays it hosts cultural exhibitions. It is located on the corner of Jiron Gamarra with Jiron Pizarro streets; is a traditional cultural center for excellence in Trujillo, here are art exhibitions and special ceremonies are performed in the central courtyard. With a well-restored house belonging to Banco Continental, is a must for all tourists seeking culture in Trujillo.

- Museo Huacas de Moche (Museum of Moche Temples)

Located at the foot of the Huaca de la Luna in the Moche District, this modern museum was opened in 2010 and it shows the recent archaeological discoveries of the Moche ceremonial religious center. Next to the Mochica monuments is a great touristic circuit for not stop visiting in Trujillo.

- Chan Chan Museum

The museum is located at the foot of Chan Chan, the largest mud city in Latin America are shown in the most important findings found in the Chimu city as well as studies on political and religious division.

Trujillo's historic heritage
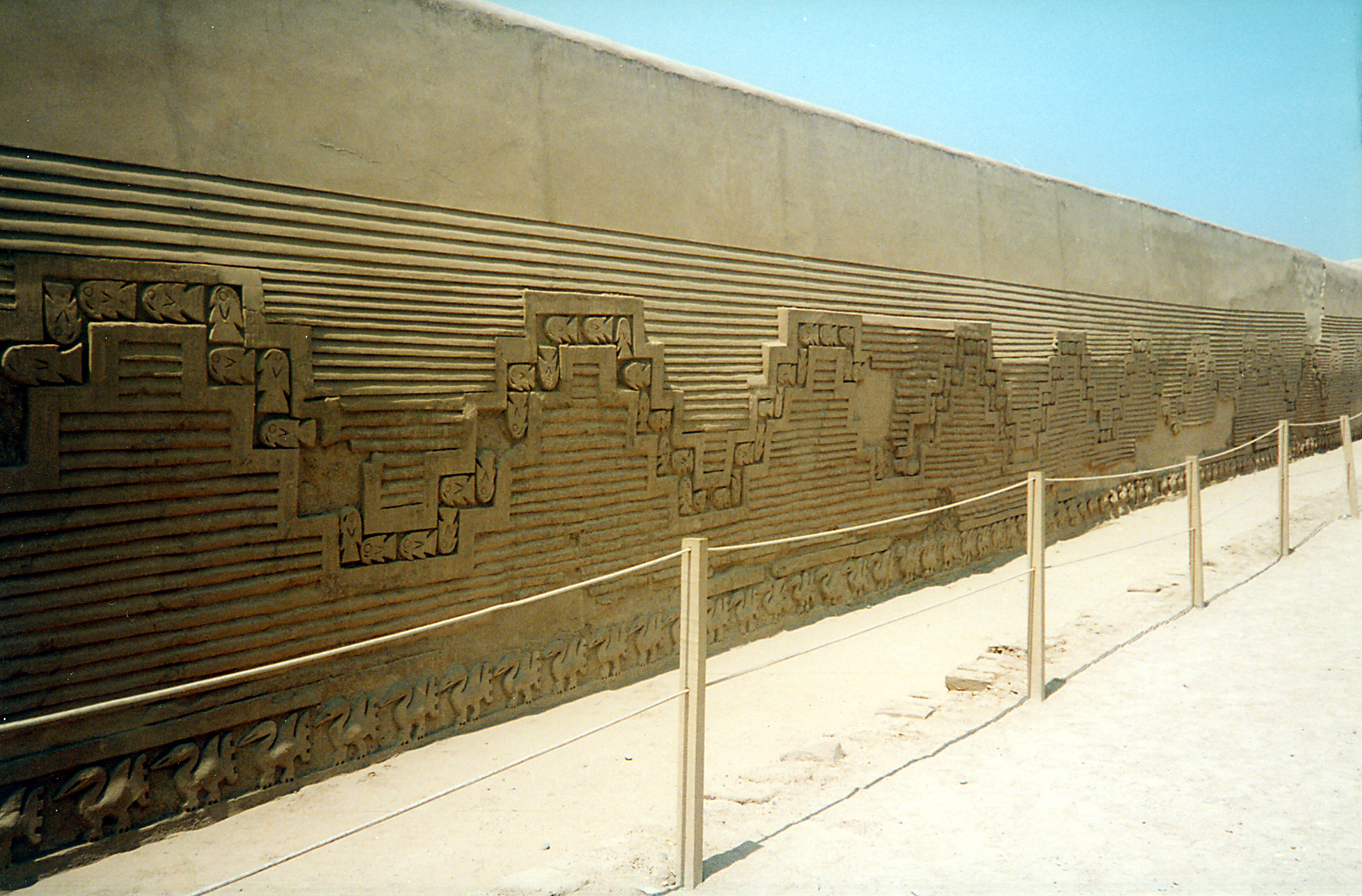
wall in Chan Chan
Capital of Chimu culture

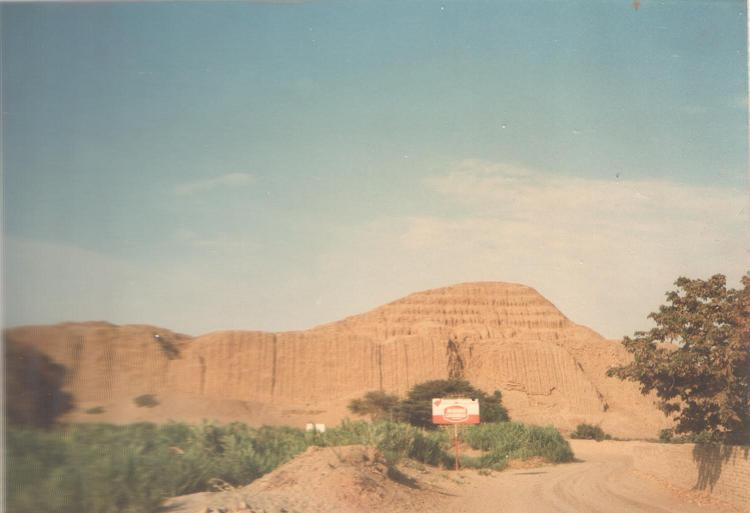
Huaca del Sol
Muchik political capital

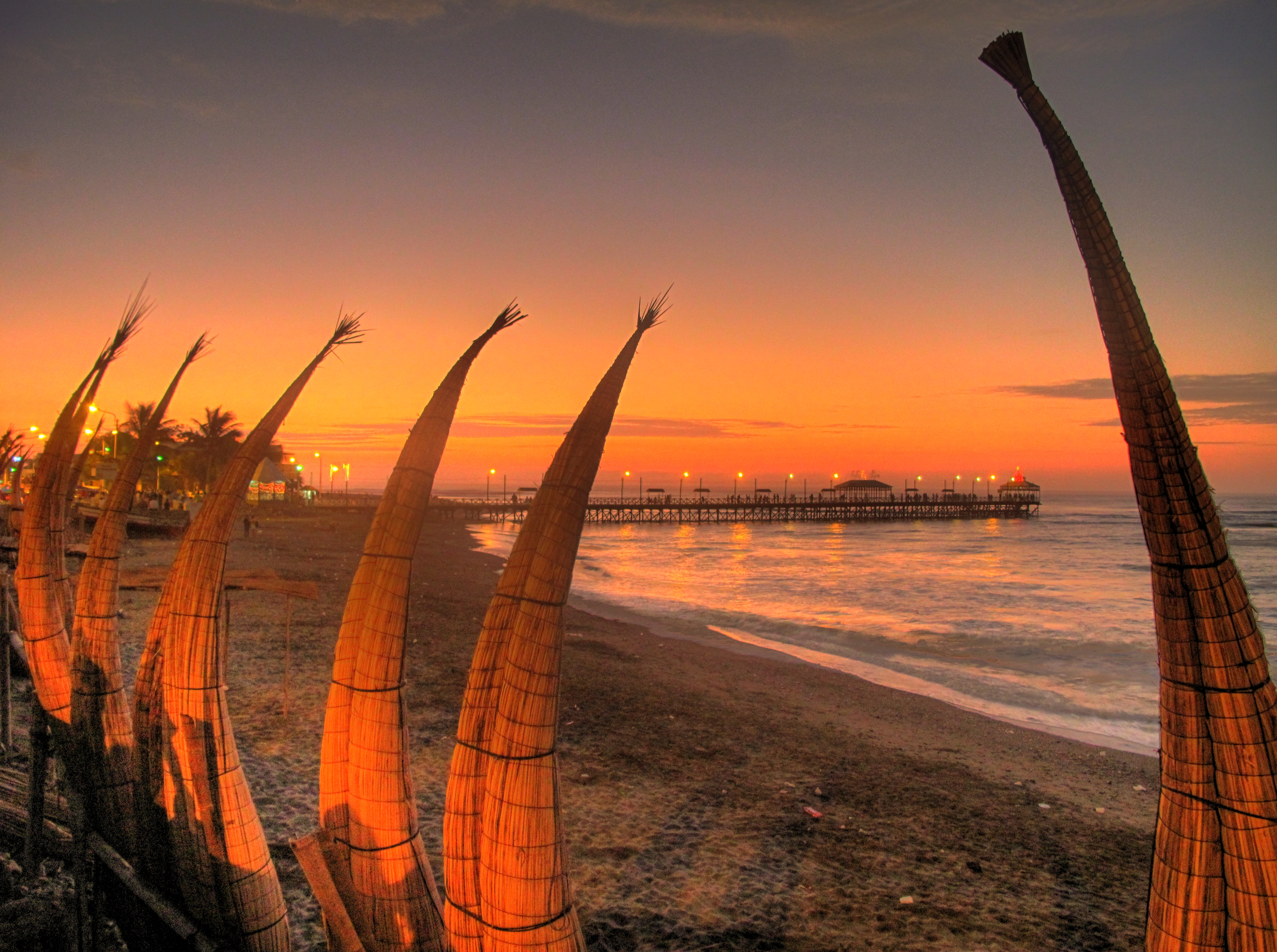
Muelle de Huanchaco
It shows the typical and ancient
caballitos de totora

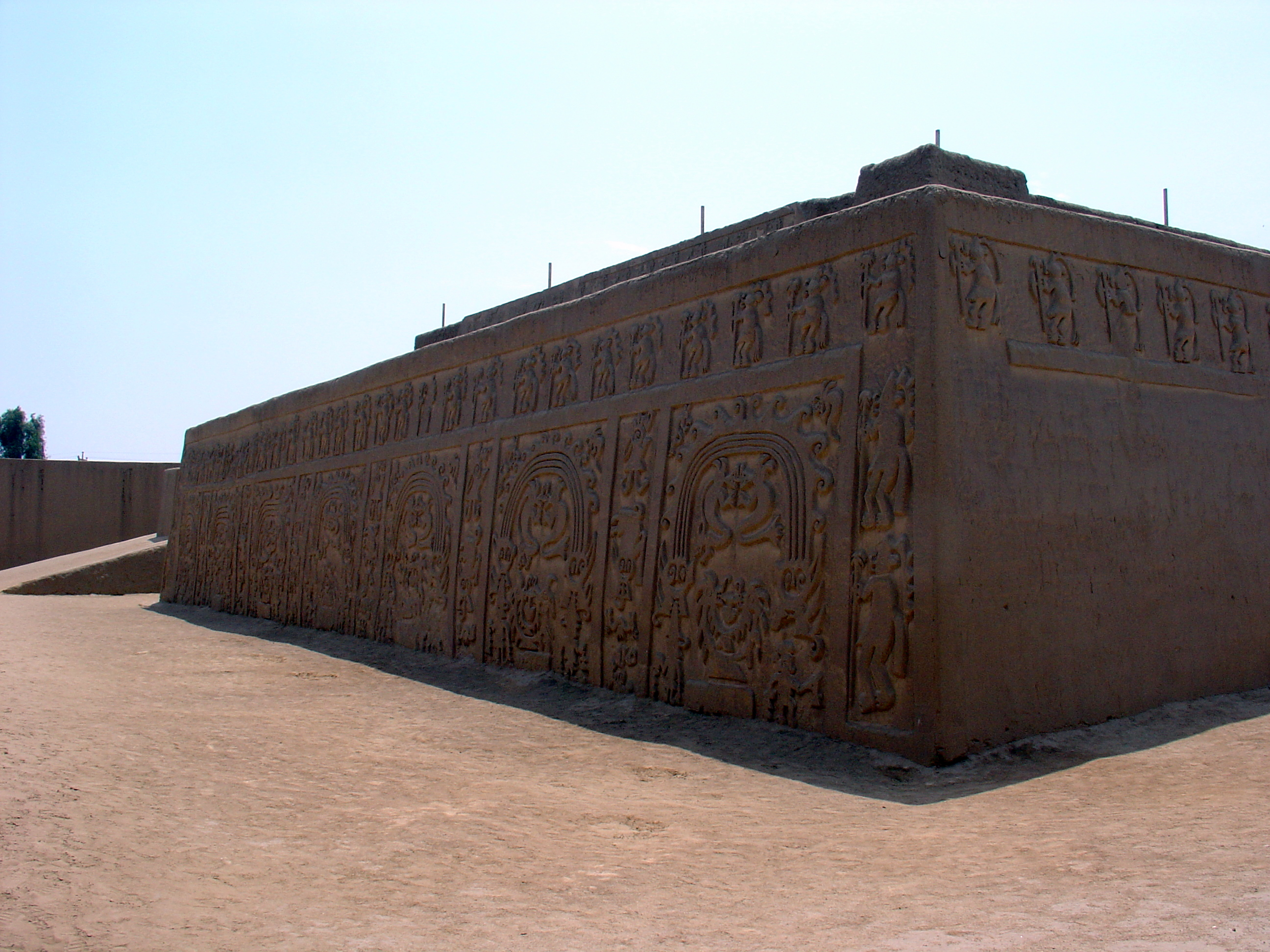
Huaca del Dragón
Chimu Temple in Trujillo city

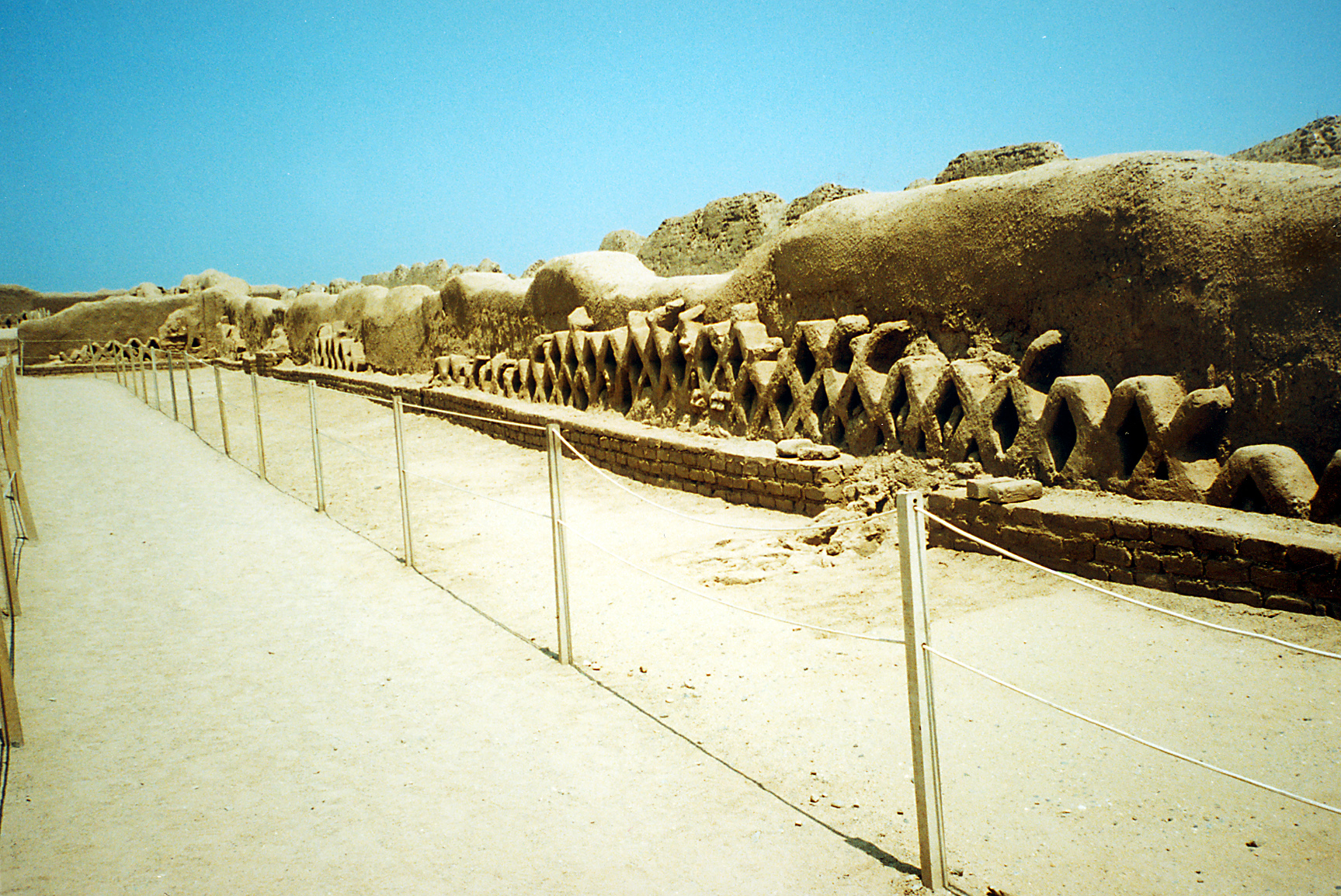
Chan Chan
Declared by UNESCO as World Heritage Site

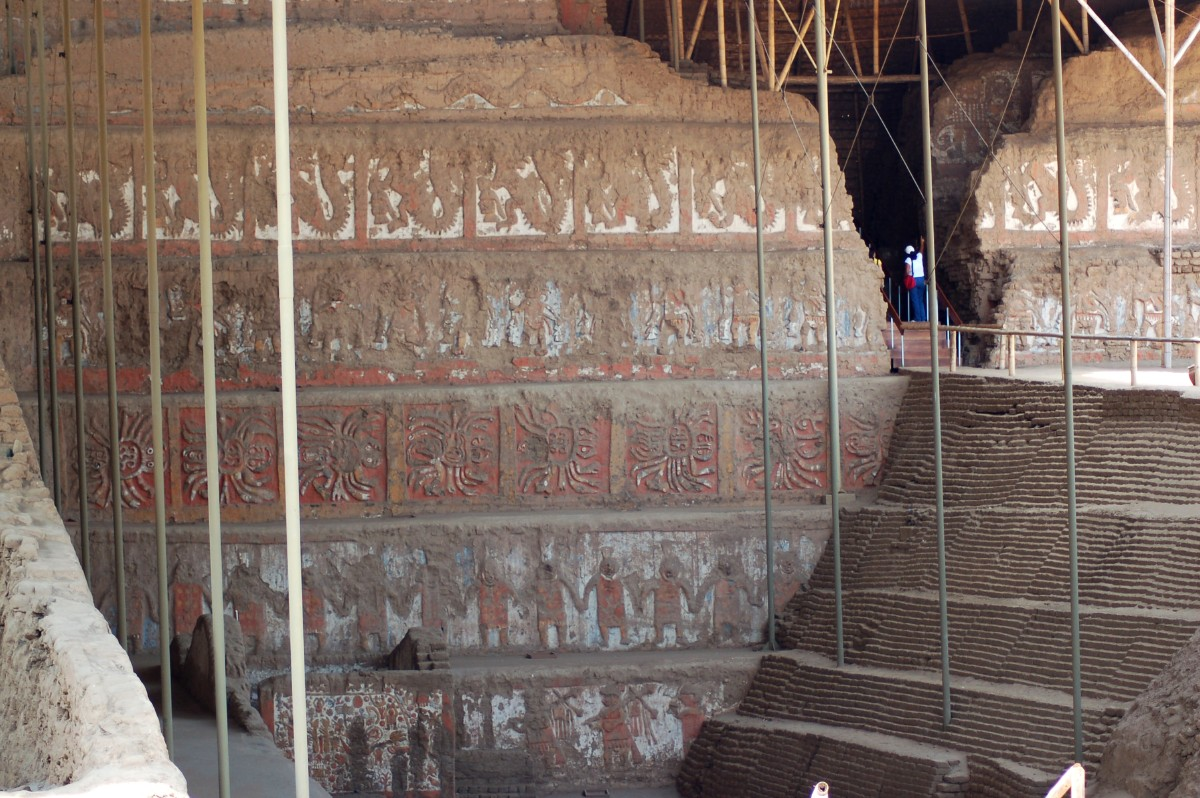
Huaca de la Luna
Mochica religiosa Capital,
wall Adorned with painted wall reliefs

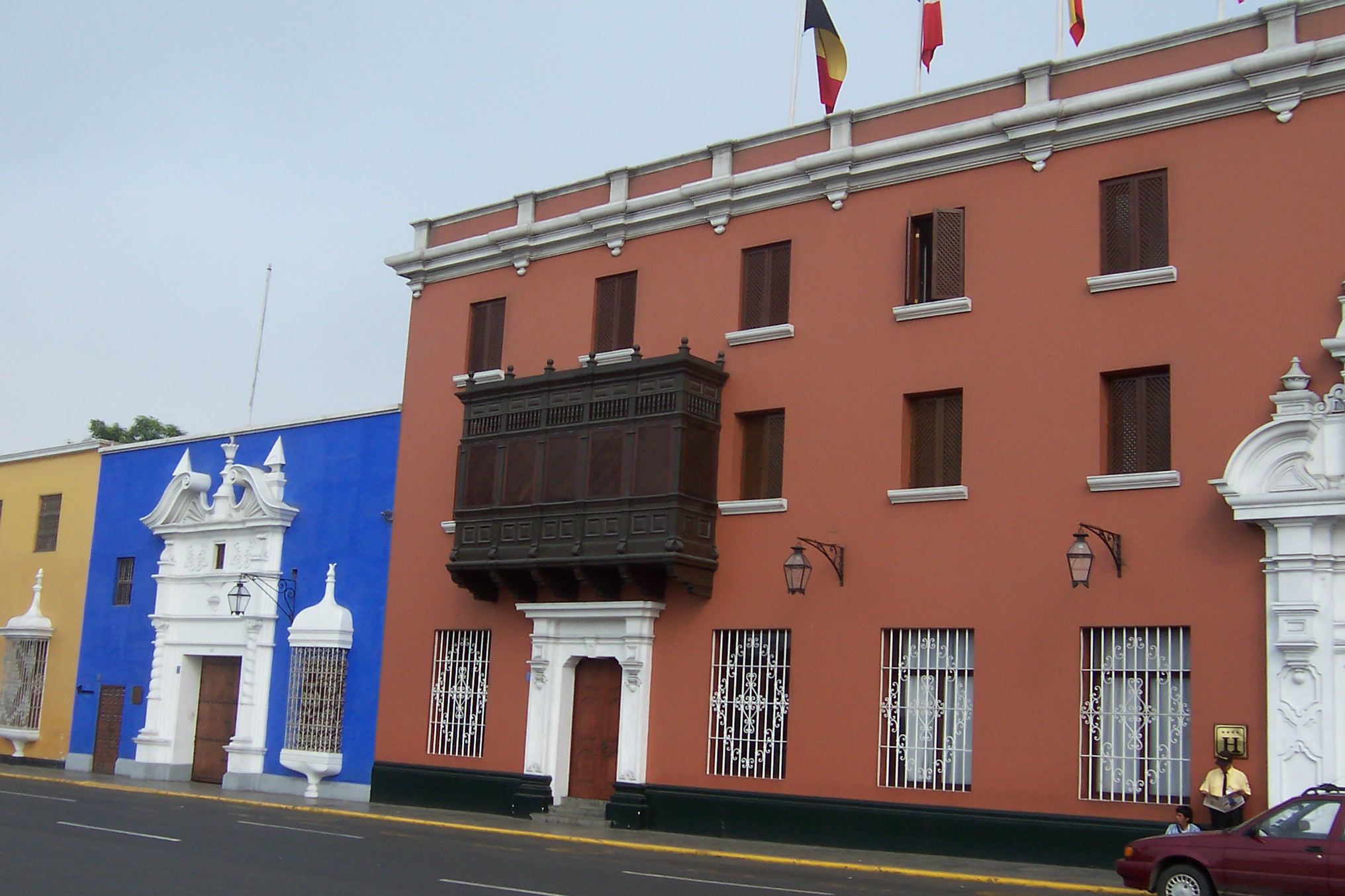
Typical balconies
Historical Center of Trujillo

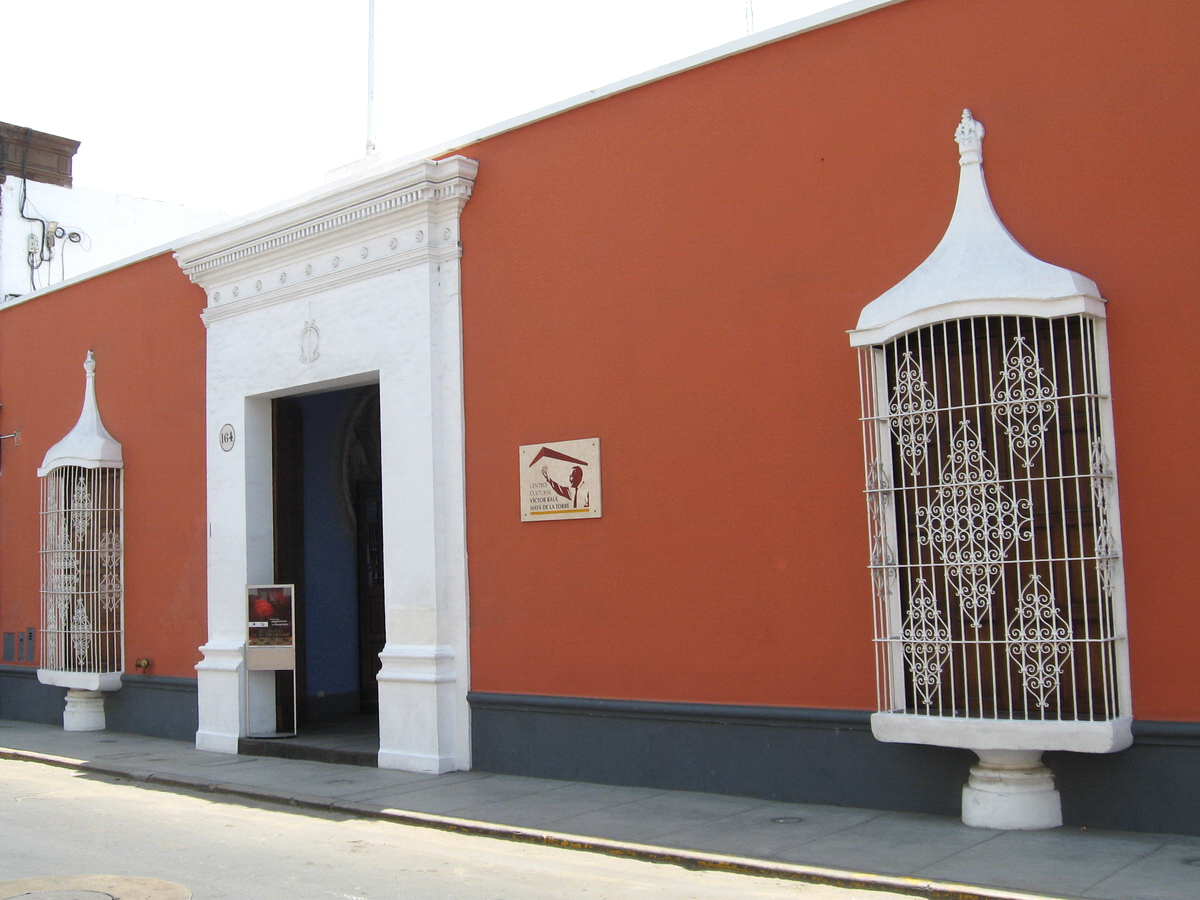
Museum House Haya de la Torre
Historical Center of Trujillo

=== Festivals and Events ===
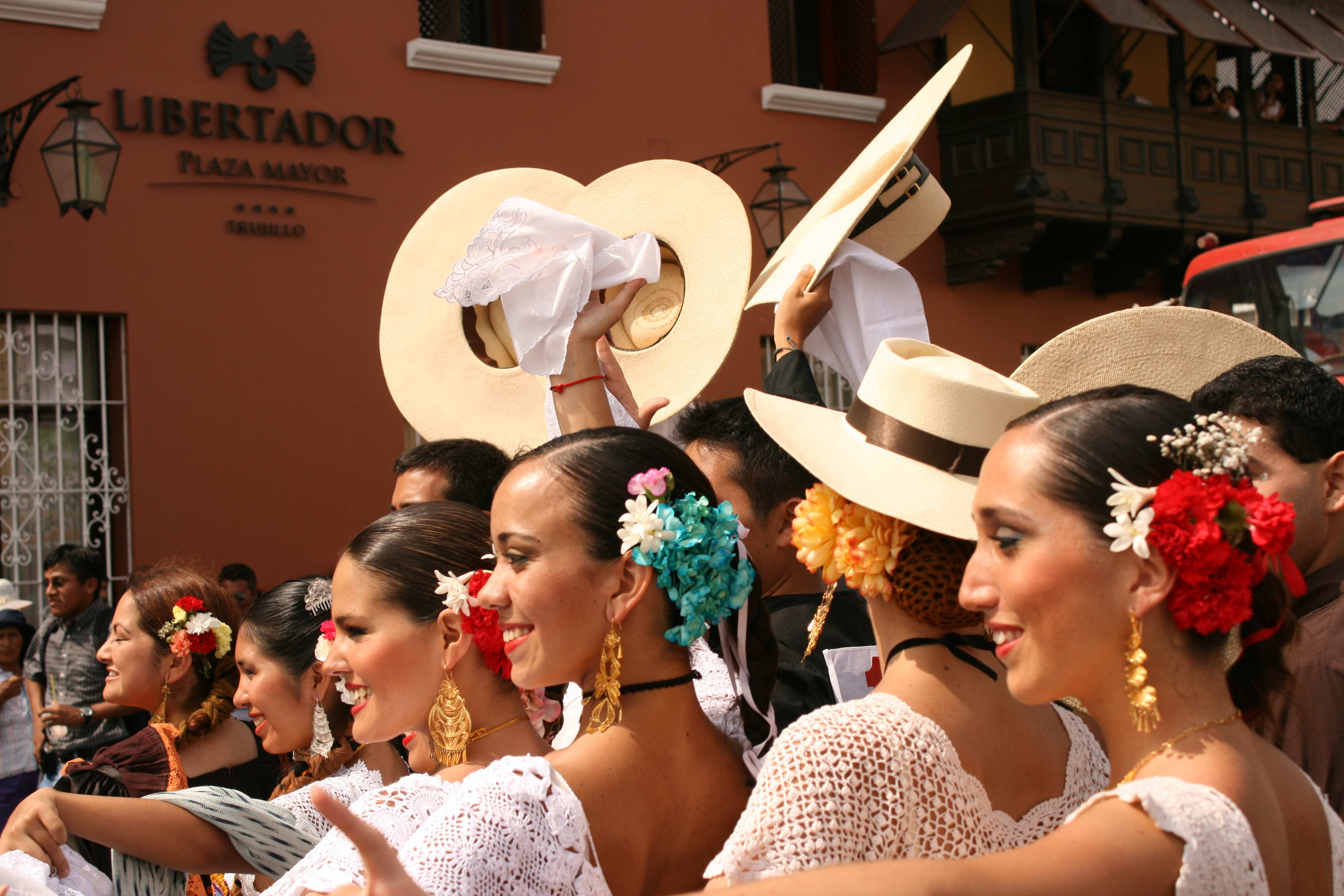
festival of the primavera, where the traditional dance, the Marinera

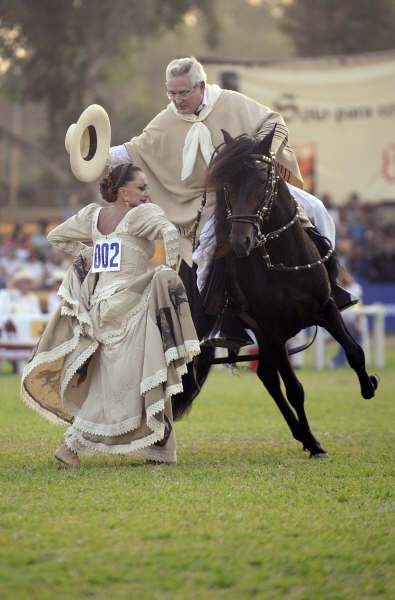
Chalan in its Peruvian paso horse dancing marinera with a woman dancer

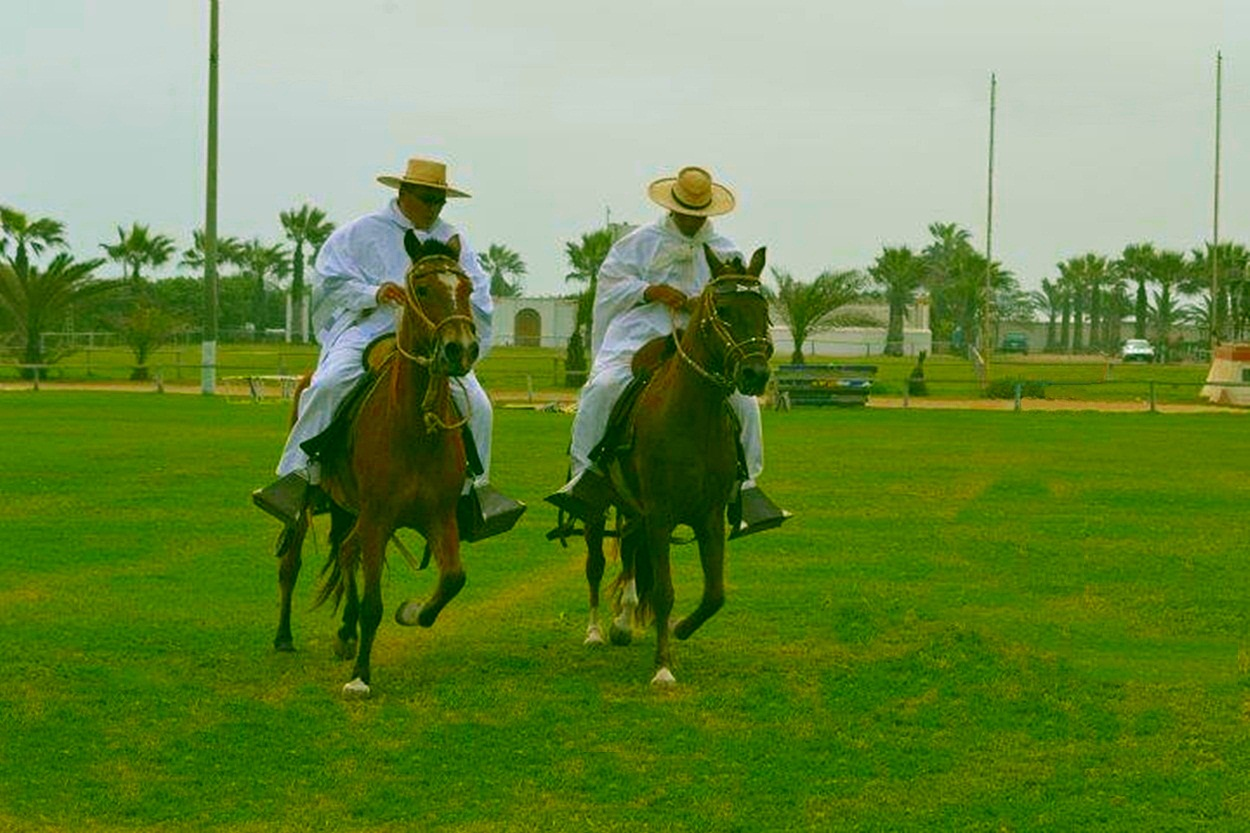
Chalanes trujillanos riding Peruvian paso horses in Víctor Larco

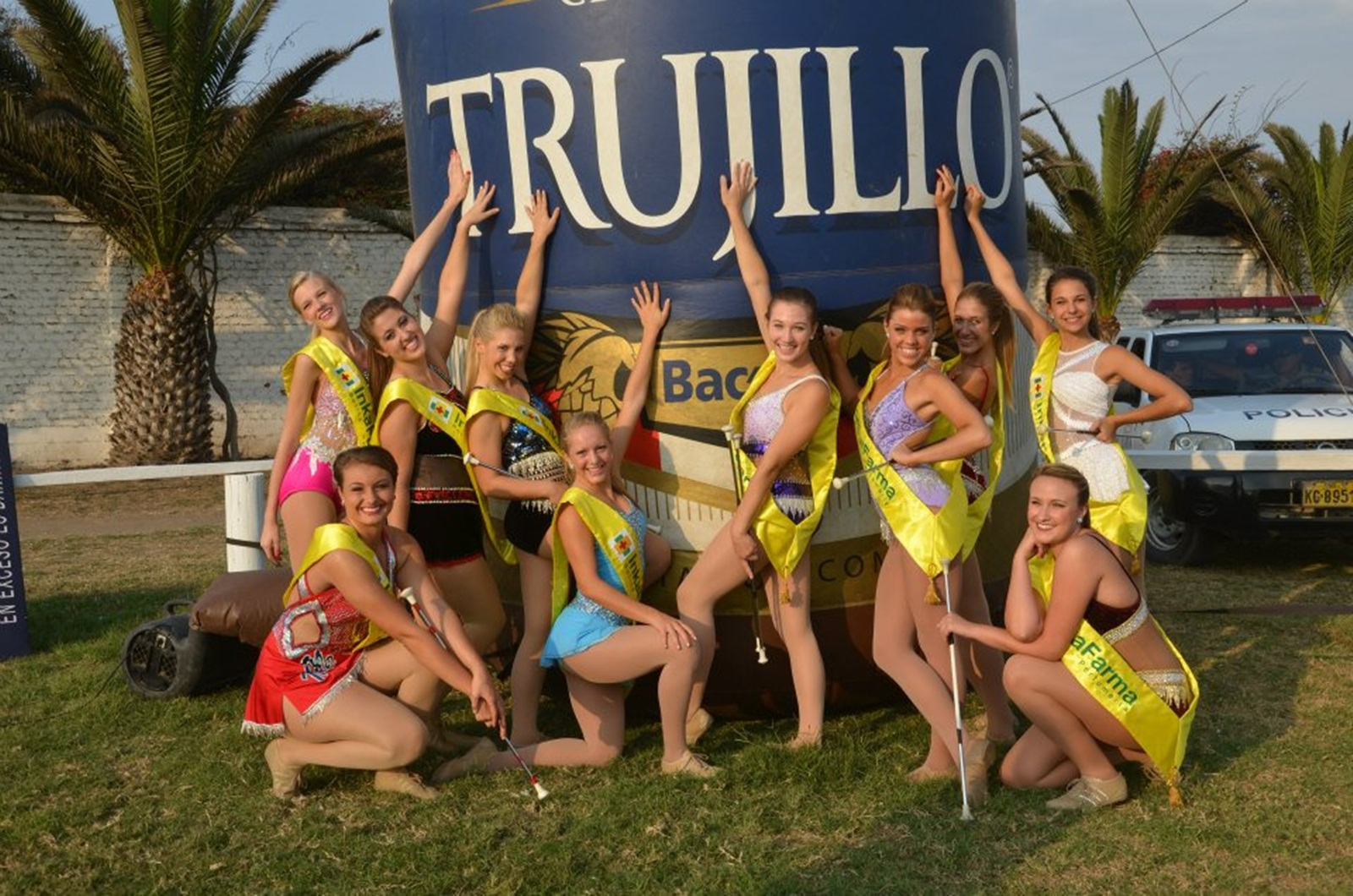
Guaripolas in Trujillo Spring Festival

Trujillo city has many national and international festivals. Festivals and events occurring regularly include:

- Marinera Festival

A festival of typical dance is very representative of the city, the national competition is organized by the Club Libertad and takes place the last week of January, couples of dancers from different parts of the country and the world are prepared every year for contest the top of the different categories of competition that draws thousands of tourists every year. It also highlights the marinera parade also with the participation of Peruvian paso horses and typical riders called chalanes through the main streets of the historic center.

- Trujillo Spring Festival (Spring International Festival)

Is considered by some as the most representative festival of the city that lives up to the nickname he carries. The festival is one of the most important in Peru and is done in early October of each year, by the Lions Club of La Libertad Region. The first festival was held in 1950, and has been held annually since. The flower festival has a rich and varied program of over a hundred activities to meet the tastes and interests of Trujillo people and thousands of domestic and foreign tourists. The activities are carried out for a month in which the city takes on a festive environment, thousands of domestic and foreign tourists arriving in the town for various events like the coronation of the Queen of Spring, competition horses step, the parade of foreign queens and Spring Corso through the main avenues of the city, where visitors revel in the maneuvers of the Guaripolas. The festival closes with the spring parade or corso and a private party organized by the Lions Club.

- San Jose Festival

Held in the resort of Las Delicias in the district of Moche on March 14, 15 and 16, is a feast day and it has been a tradition with a strong Spanish influence, which are enjoyed various activities for adults, youth and children, party hosts are Don Jose and Dona Josefa and Ms Maja, the event begins with the description of characters, activities, bars, flamenco dancing, etc. This festival is accompanied by a procession of the patron Saint Joseph, the fashion show, the bullfight, the parade of characters, and toromatch pamplonada in which involved several teams from other departments. Some houses are become in Spanish bars decorated with motifs like flags, grimaldas and posters.

- Contest of Peruvian Paso Horse

Trujillo is considered cradle of Peruvian paso horse and in the city there are contests organized by the Association of Breeders and Owners of Paso Horses in La Libertad, the best known and most important are The National Competition Paso Horses being done within the framework of the International Spring Festival made between September and October and in the Festival and International Competition of Marinera in January. Peruvian government has declared this kind of horses as Nation's cultural heritage.

- Trujillo Book Festival, in the year 2012 it took place the 5th edition organized by the Peruvian Chamber of Book by agreement with the Provincial Municipality of Trujillo, in the framework of the celebrations of 477 years of Spanish foundation of Trujillo. This time, it is estimated that more than 100,000 visitors attended to the "Plazuela El Recreo" to the 152 cultural and artistic activities, such as book presentations, poetry readings, tributes, lectures, shows and children's activities.
- Festival of Lyric Singing, It is an international festival that takes place in November of every year and it is a competition of singers from several countries. In 2011 took place the 15th edition of this festival. This event features singers international exponents of the lyric mainly from Americas, Asia and Europe, in addition have the presence of teachers and international pianists, It is organized by the Cultural Promotion Center of Trujillo, and it takes place in the Municipal theater of the city.
- Independence Day of Trujillo, is celebrated on December 29 of each year to commemorate the day of the proclamation of independence of Trujillo made in the Main Square in 1820 by the Marquis of Torre Tagle, It is officially declared a holiday in the entire province with many cultural and artistic activities in celebration.
- Carnival of Huanchaco

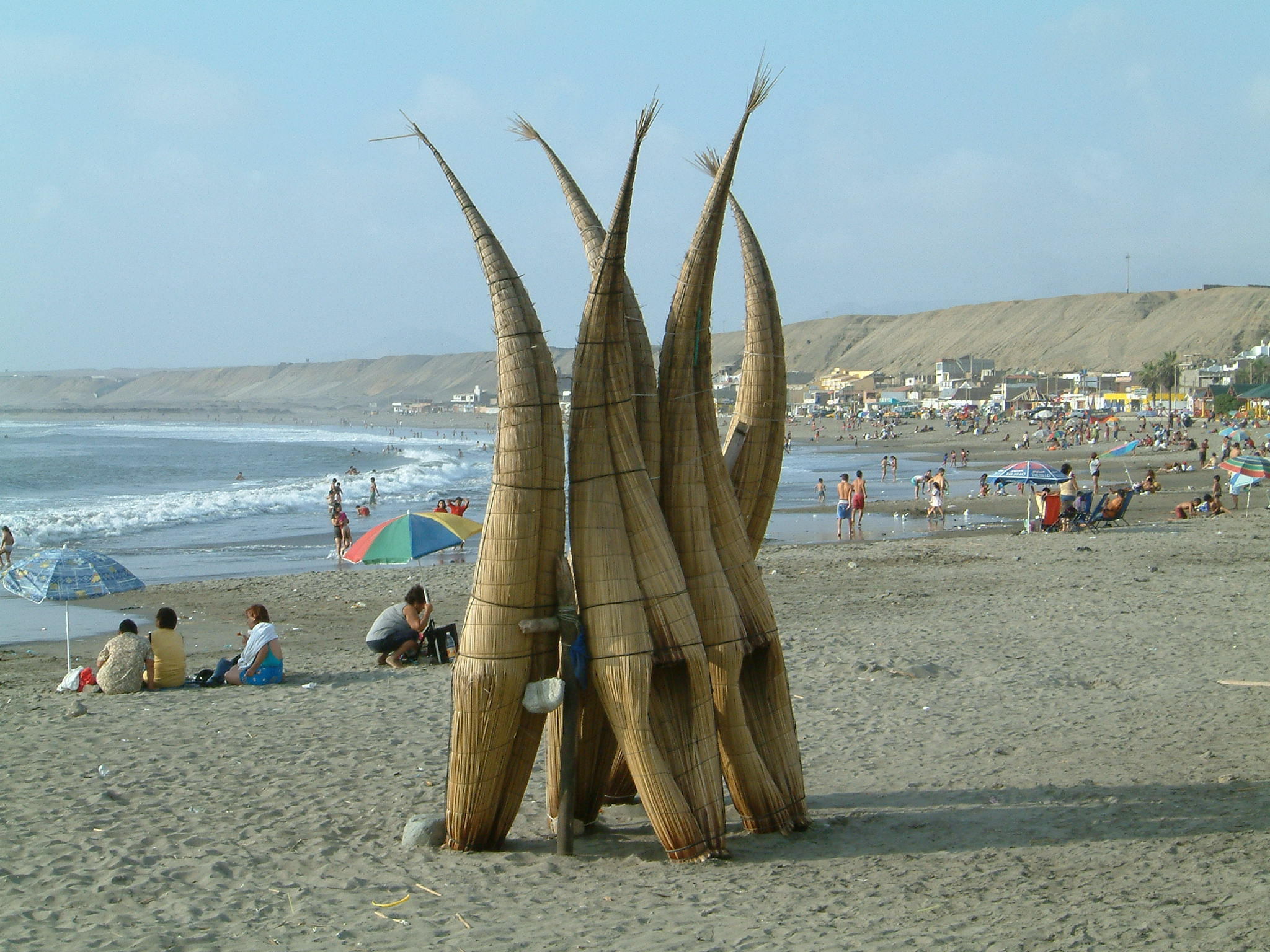
In Huanchaco a carnival takes place in early February of every year

The festival took place from the early 20th century in the District of Huanchaco. District residents were emulating the famous Venetian Carnival, when, years later, the carnival was organized by the Huanchaco Club. The carnival has many activities including the crowning of the queen, surf contest, Luau party, Creativity in the Sand. The carnival parade among others, takes place in early February.

- Trujillo Ballet Festival

The International version began performing since 1977 at the Municipal Theatre with the participation of delegations from many countries of the world being well known, the national version is made with the participation of delegations representing various regions of country.

- Miss La Libertad

In April of every year, each province of the region sends a representative to contest for the 'Miss La Libertad' title. This event has been realized in various locations including historical places as the Plaza de armas, the city of Chan Chan, Huanchaco beach etc.

- Trujillo Anniversary Week is celebrated in the first week of March to commemorate the date of installation of the first council (municipality) in the city on March 5, 1535, by Francisco Pizarro. The celebrations last about 5 days and it features the presentation of various cultural events.
- Carnival of Conache, it is held each year in the traditional town of Conache, located in Laredo District at southeast of the city. It consists of several activities including the crowning of the queen, and a big celebration with the ancient drink called Chicha. The carnival is a costumbrist event and it has been held since year 1996.
- Lord of Huaman Festival

It takes place in the town of Santiago de Huamán The origin of this traditional festival dates back more than 300 years. It is a religious festival that attracts the interest of pilgrims and tourists who visit the historic temple of Santiago de Huaman. The celebration of the festival takes place from 13 to 27 May in honor of the Lord of Huaman; are made novenas, rosary and confessions offered by his faithful devotees. The celebrations also include morning and afternoon sports.

- Gastronomic festival of Trujillo, also called Sabe a Perú, it honors flagship products of kitchen trujillana like pepper of moche. Various art shows and dances, such as marinera and tondero, are also performed. Also contests are held, such as the best dishes of the fair representatives from the gastronomy of Trujillo, among participants are restaurants, kitchens rural, huariques, etc.

=== Gastronomy ===
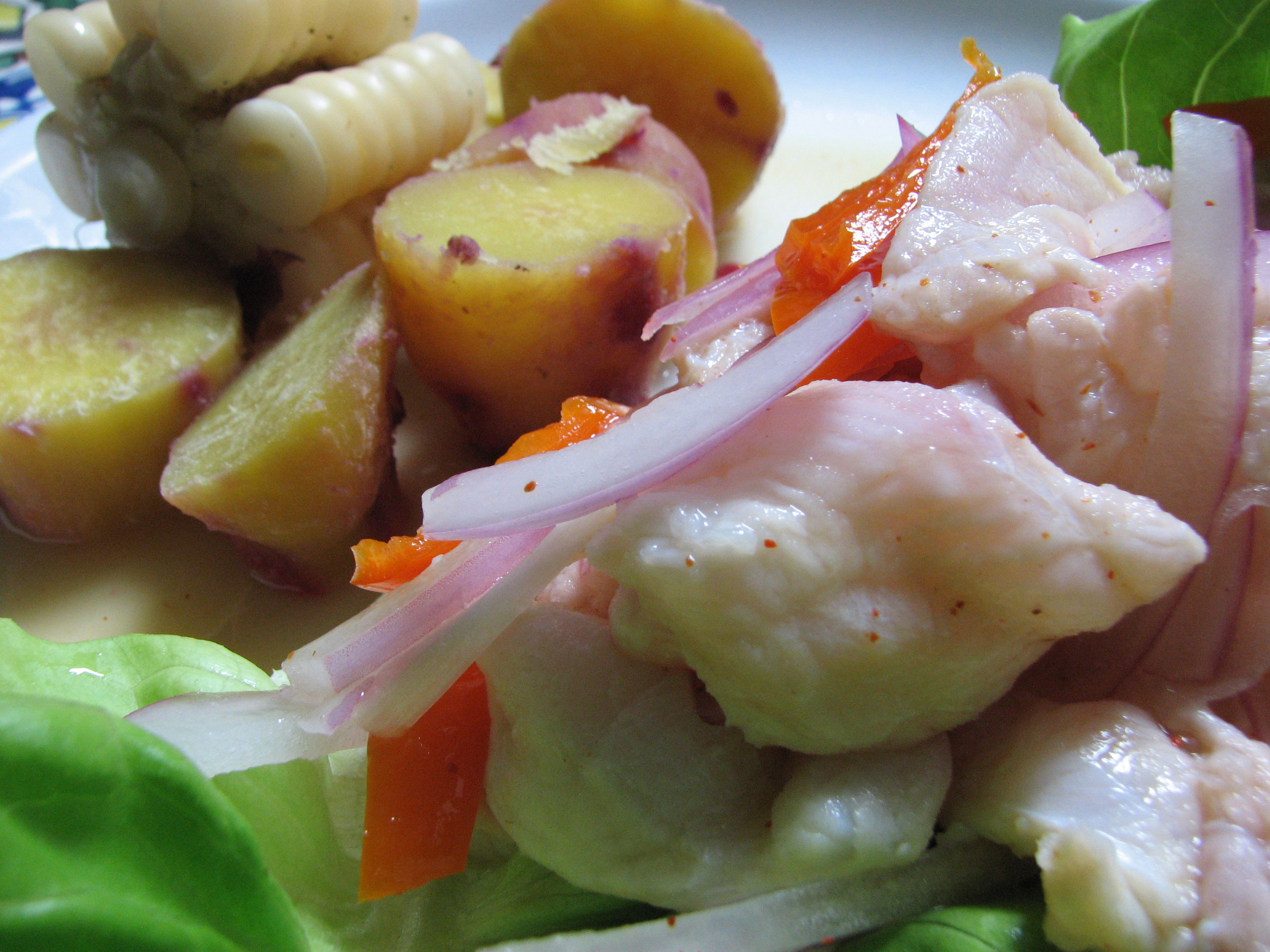
Cebiche, typical dish of Trujillo city, National Cultural Heritage by the Peruvian government

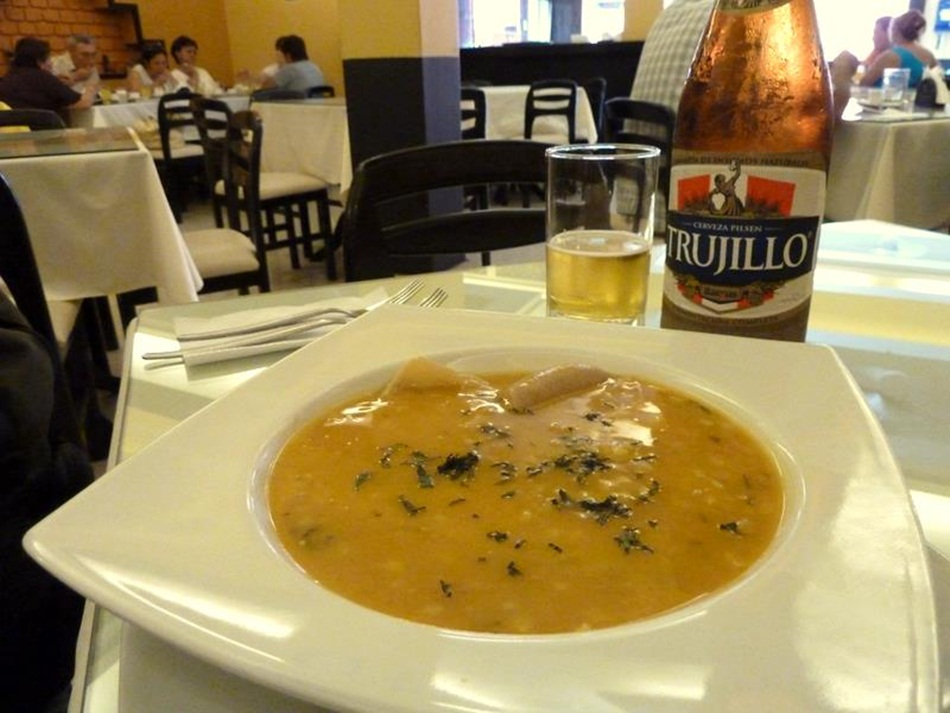
Shambar is a soup, typical dish of Trujillo city

Trujillo's gastronomy is based on fish, shellfish, seaweed, birds, and livestock.

Among the most representative dishes include:

- Cebiche: Similar dishes have been eaten for at least 2000 years, including in the ancient Moche culture which had its capital south of the city of Trujillo. The dish is prepared using five basic ingredients: chunks of fish fillet with lemon, onion, salt and chili or chili Moche. Ingredients are added to taste, with one result being mixed cebiche. Fish used include both freshwater and sea species, as well as other seafood such as shellfish and seaweed and sometimes vegetables. The dish is accompanied by products such as sweet potatoes, boiled corn, cassava, lettuce leaves, and roasted corn. This dish has been declared National Cultural Heritage by the Peruvian government.
- Shambar, soup made with beans also includes smoked ham. Served with roasted corn. In restaurants traditionally served on Mondays.
- Theologian soup: broth turkey and / or chicken with soaked bread, potatoes, milk and cheese, is traditionally prepared in the district of Moche.
- Beans to the Trujillo: black beans with sesame seeds and chili mirasol.
- Pepián of turkey: turkey stew with rice, ground corn, cilantro and chili.
- Trujillo fish: steamed fish with eggs and onion sauce.
- Mollejitas to the sillao: dish served with onion salad and boiled yucc.
- The alfajores of Trujillo

In the city of Trujillo is typical the manufacturing and consumption of sweets and a series of traditional alfajores; formerly called Alfajor of Trujillo that has been manufactured by various candy stores being the best known Dulcería Castañeda, this candy store has become a traditional brand of alfajores in the city; since 1925 they have made alfajores and various giant named alfajor king kong formerly known as "Alfajor of Trujillo", "Dulcería Castañeda" currently has several locals. Its main products are their alfajores and which are requested as classics sweet souvenirs of the city of the everlasting spring.

- Drinks

Among the highlights typical drinks are chicha of Moche, made of jora; chicha of Magdalena de Cao, etc.

=== Music and dance ===
The music and dance that represents to the city is the Marinera, and the city is considered as Capital of Marinera, this dance and choreographic and musical forms in its various regional varieties, has been declared as national cultural heritage. The city has numerous dance academies where they grow this traditional dance, some since very young, also in these academies are preparing many participants from the city to the national competition of this dance held every year in January.

== Transportation ==
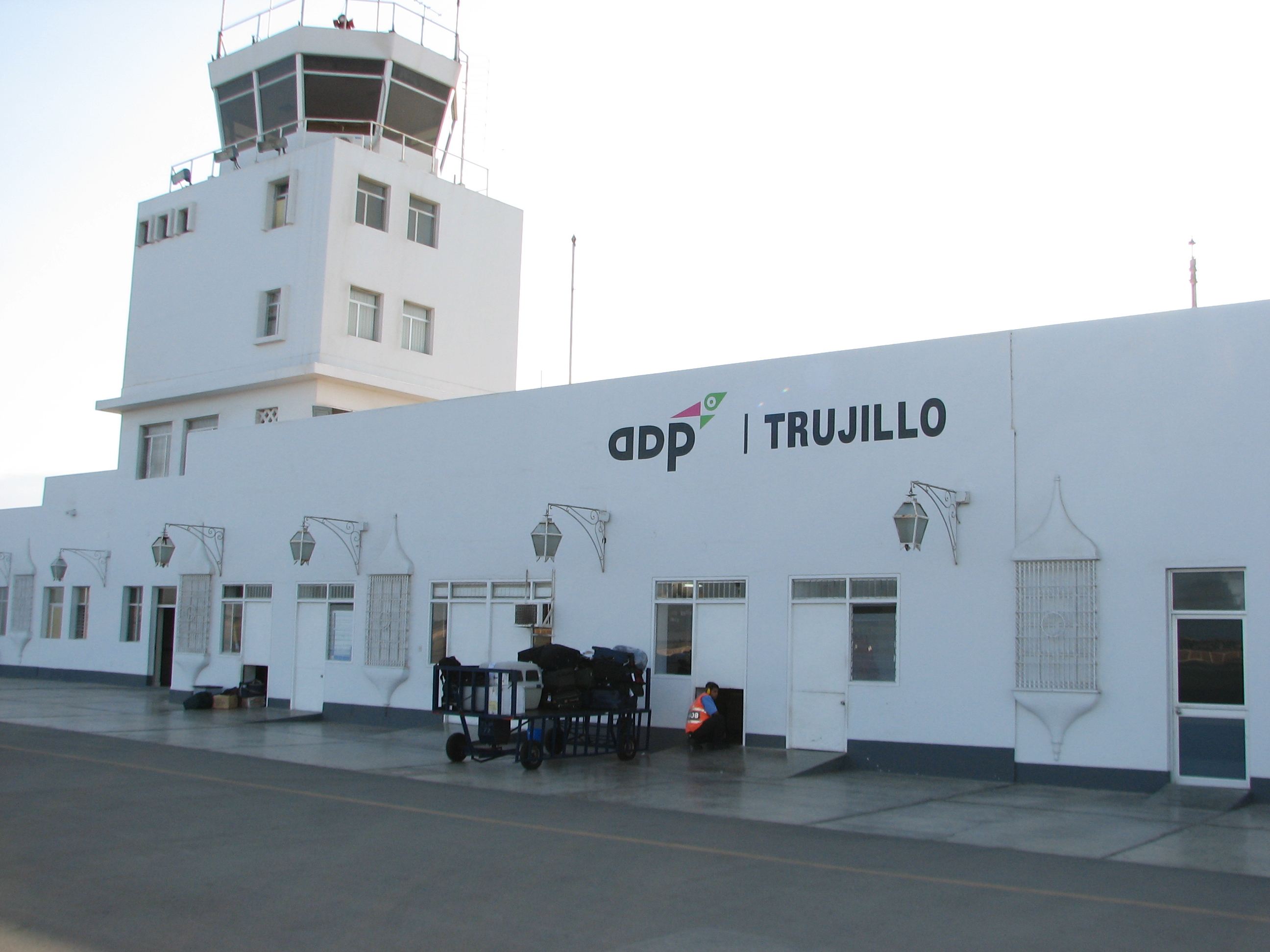
Carlos Martínez de Pinillos International Airport located in Huanchaco District

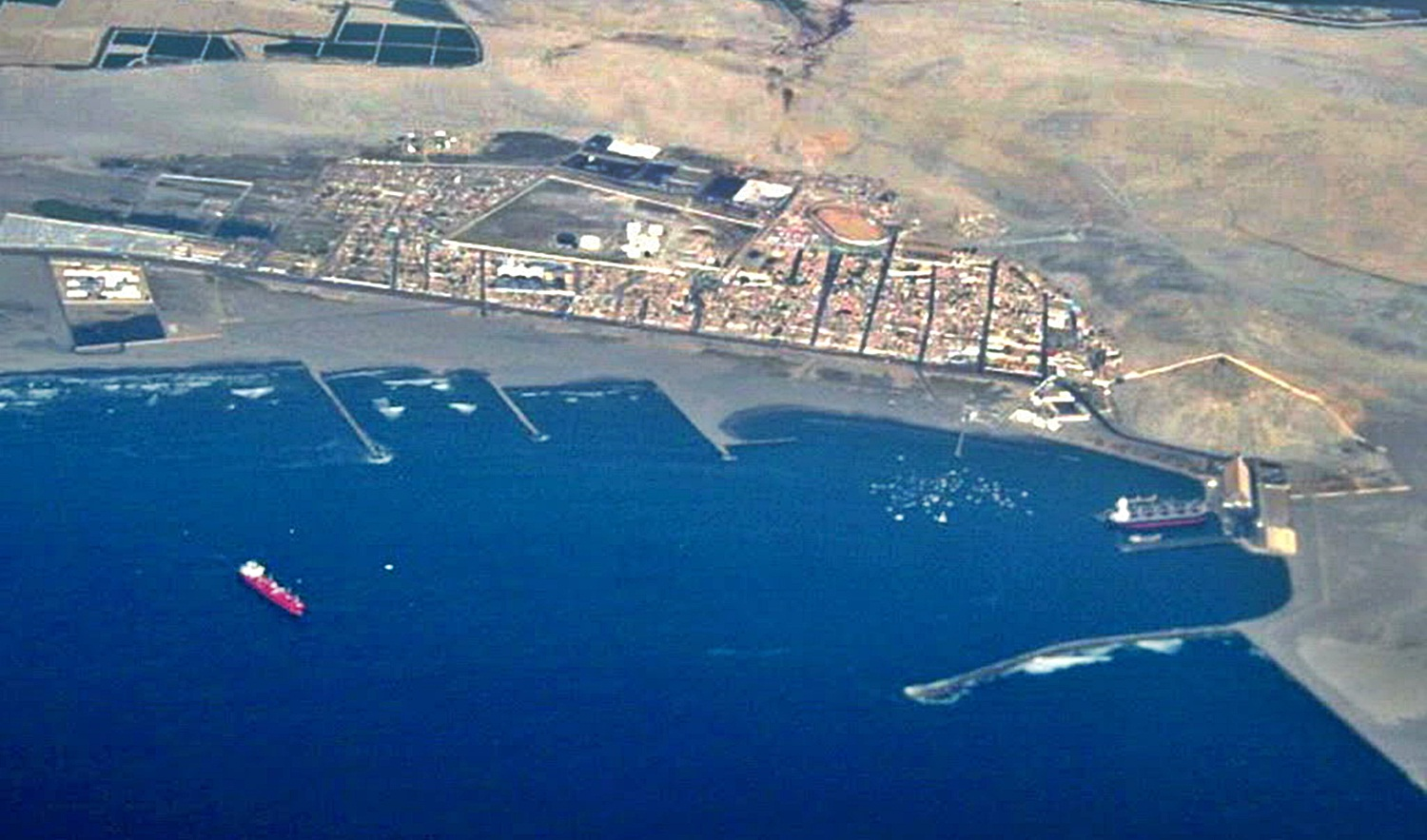
View of Salaverry port from the air, one of the most active commercial ports from Peru

=== Air ===
Important to the city's transportation network is the Capitán FAP Carlos Martínez de Pinillos International Airport, located in Huanchaco District northwest of Trujillo metropolitan area, serving as Trujillos international airport. The airport provides daily service to Lima and Santiago.

=== Maritime ===
The port town of Salaverry located at southwest Trujillo city is one of the most commercial ports of Peru. Salaverry port is located some 258 nautical miles (478 kilometres; 297 miles) north of Callao. Its good linking with Trujillo (12 km (7.5 mi)) and the Panamerican Highway (8 km (5.0 mi)) makes the port of easy access by road to the shippers and receivers (mainly fishmeal, fertilizers, mineral concentrates, rice and sugar) located within its influence area. This port has great commercial activity due to agricultural exports. Another port town is Puerto Chicama (Puerto Malabrigo) are used for maritime connection. with the world.

=== Road ===
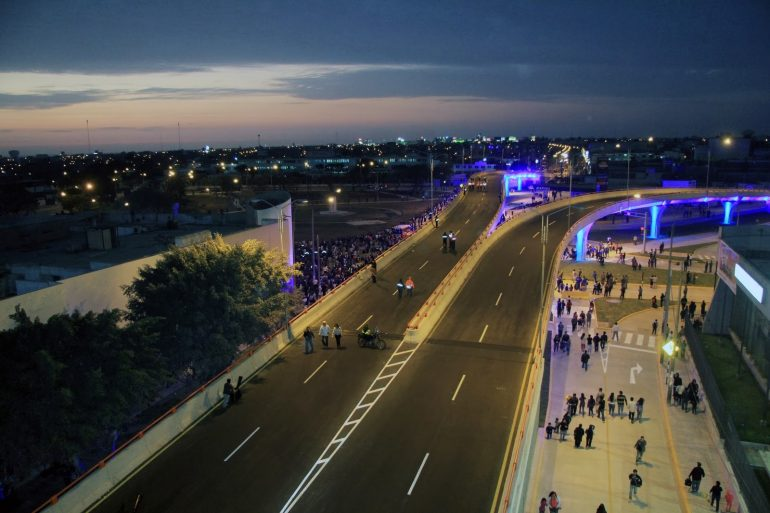
Highway bypass between the streets of Mansiche and Nicolás de Piérola

The city is connected to all the main coastal cities by the Pan-American Highway.

==== Public transport ====
According to studies by the Municipality of Trujillo in the city, it is estimated that there is a weekly demand of 29,285 passengers traveling by bus outside of Trujillo and 28,580 passengers are arriving weekly to the city by the same transportation, so that the municipality plans to build a bus station starting mid-2012. As part of the shares of the project "Sustainable Cities" that is executing the Municipality of Trujillo in agreement with the Inter-American Development Bank, It has been presented a "Plan of mobility for Trujillo ", it consists of four main projects: implementation of Segregated cycle facilities, pedestrianization of the historic center, the construction of the green ring of España avenue and the implementation of Light rail for the city.

==== Main avenues ====
- Larco Avenue is one of the main avenues of the city, named after the philanthropist Victor Larco Herrera by this via urbanistically joins Trujillo and Víctor Larco districts. It begins in the west of the city and starts from the sector of Buenos Aires and runs to the Historic Centre of Trujillo, covers many blocks which have numerous shopping centers, of education, health, regional government agencies, etc.
- España Avenue
- America Avenue.
- César Vallejo Avenue
- Nicolás de Piérola Avenida
- Mansiche Avenue

== Media ==
In Trujillo city are available virtually all existing communications services that can be used to transmit or exchange information permanently from public telephones and internet booths up to wireless communication networks.

Trujillo concentrates much of the entire media of the La Libertad Region, in television, radio, print and communication services through the internet and fixed and mobile telephony.

=== Newspapers ===
Among the newspapers published in the city of Trujillo; one of the largest circulation newspaper is La Industria, also publishes the newspaper Nuevo Norte and the evening newspaper that is called Satélite.

=== Telecommunication ===
==== Television channels ====
Trujillo is the headquarters of several television channels some with a presence in several cities in the northern region. The following table shows the TV channels based in Trujillo.

TV stations in Trujillo city
Name	Channel	Name	Channel
UCV Satelital	15	Antena Norte	35
Ozono TV	41	TV Mundo	27
Frecuencia TV	55	SOL TV	21
CTV Televisión	45	UPAO TV	39

==== Radio ====
From Trujillo several stations emit their radio signal type AM and FM. Following is a table with some FM stations.

Radio stations in Trujillo city
FM Radios
Radio	MHz	Radio	MHz
Radio Nova	105.1 MHz	Frecuencia 100	101.9 MHz
Stereo Diplomat Radio	92.1 MHz	96 Bravaza	96.1 MHz
Ozono Radio	104.1 MHz	Radio La Grande	99.1 MHz
Radio Rumba	99.9 MHz	PeruFolkRadio
Radio Boulevard

== Sports ==
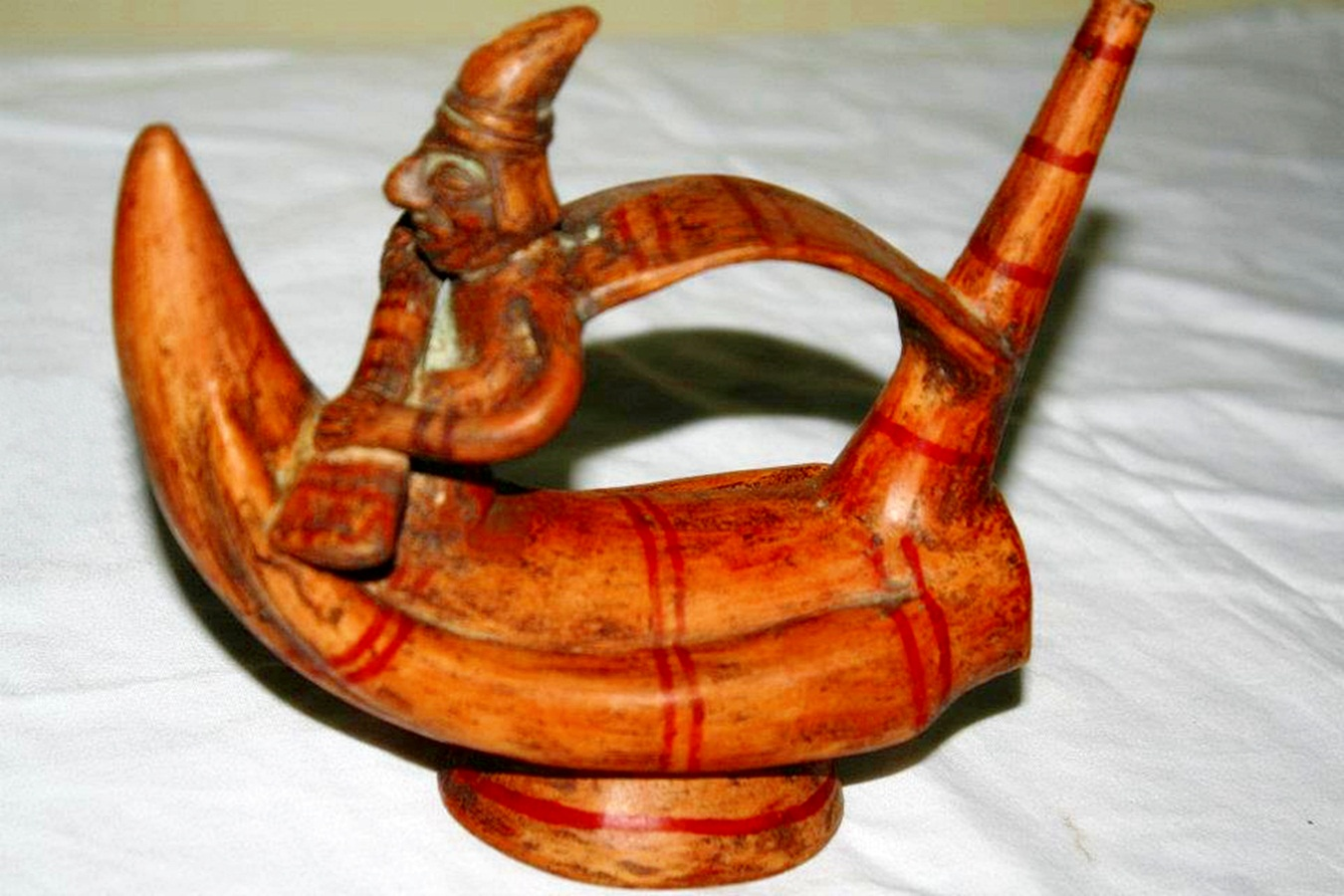
A pre-Columbian pottery of a Mochica navigator (3,000 years old)

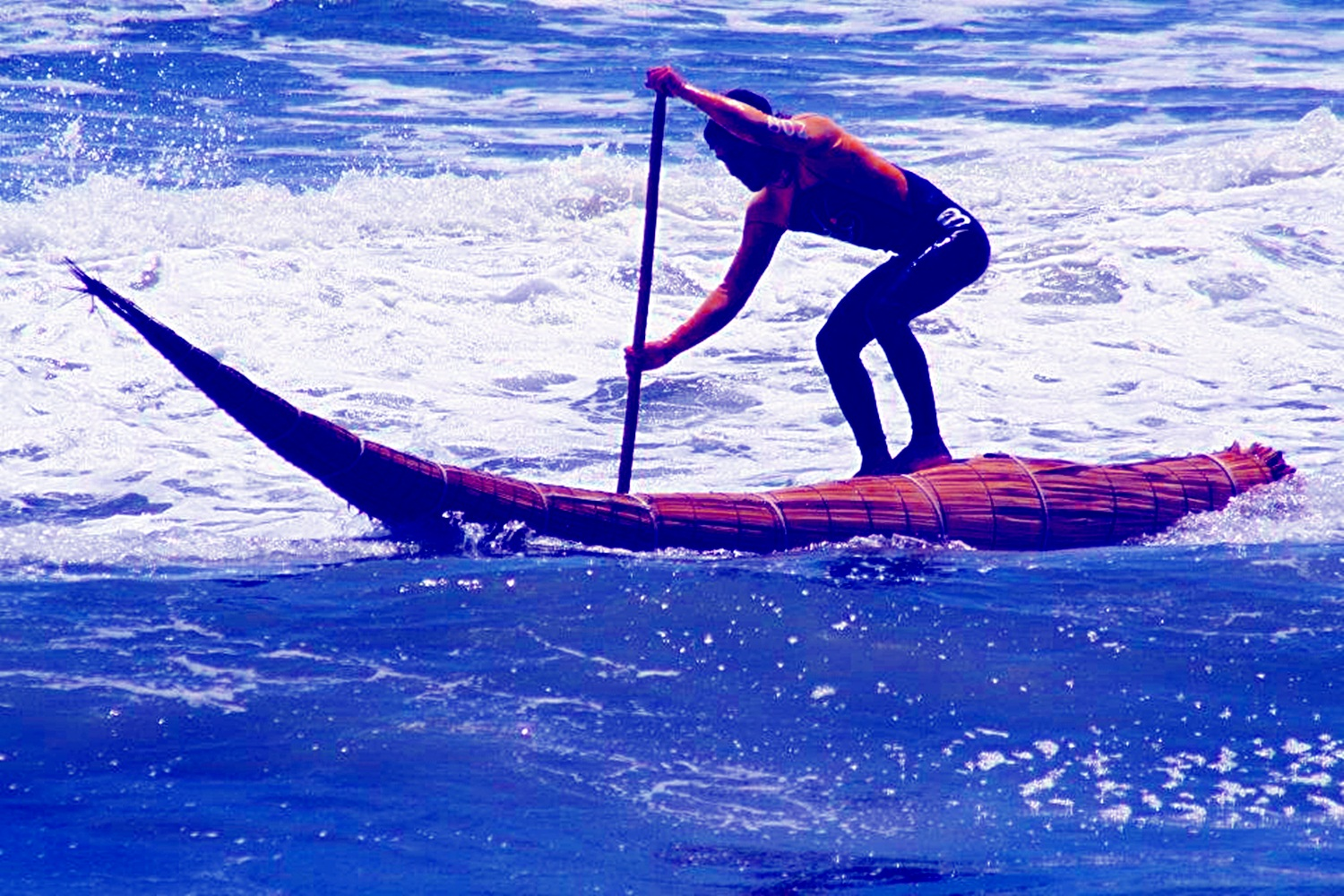
Surfing in a caballito de totora

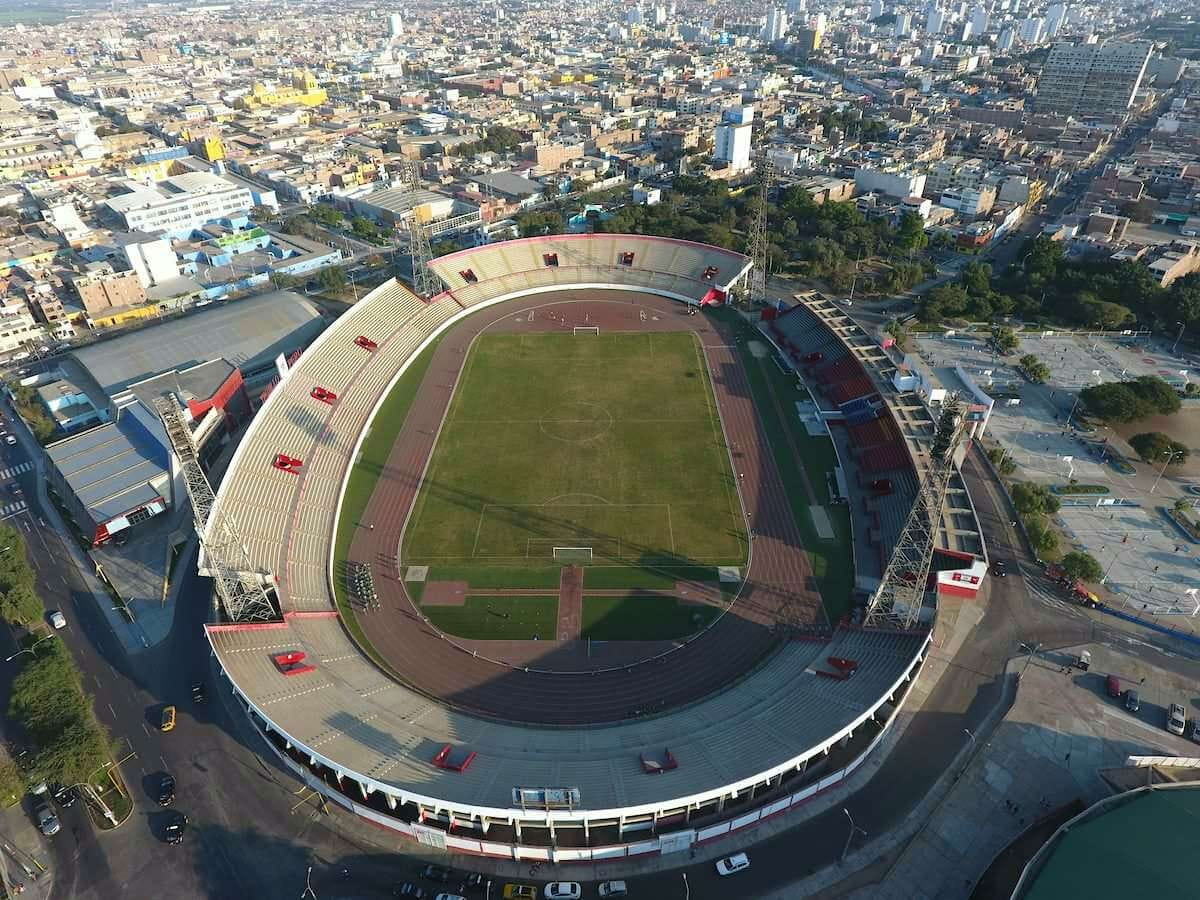
Estadio Mansiche

Some of the most popular sports in the city are volleyball, basketball, swimming, karate, surfing practiced mostly in Huanchaco beach, sandboarding, etc. The most popular sport and is practiced in Trujillo is football, now represented in the Peruvian primera division of soccer by club Carlos A. Mannucci and Cesar Vallejo University. The main stadium of Trujillo is Estadio Mansiche, a multi-use stadium that can hold 25,036 spectators. The main stage for volleyball is the Coliseo Gran Chimu both located in the Sports complex Mansiche.

Basketball, is also a growing sport, since a BCT (Basketball Club Trujillo), UCV (Universidad Cesar Vallejo) achieved to be in semifinals of the national basketball club tournament. Last 3 years (2016, 2017, 2018) Trujillo's basketballs clubs have continue growing in level and trying to reach the group stages of the national club tournament.

=== Sport events ===
- Half Marathon La Industria, on November 25, 2012, was held the 43rd edition of this event that has as major category a distance of 21,098 km running across principal avenues of the city It is organized by the newspaper La Intustria.
- Huanchaco Longboard World Championship

The Huanchaco longboard world is a surfing competition takes place since 2010 in the El Elio Beach in Huanchaco and brings together leading surfers of several countries of the world.

- Copa Ciudad de Trujillo, is an international competition of football hosted in Trujillo, Peru since 2010. It features four teams: Trujillo's major team Universidad César Vallejo, and guest teams from Colombia (in 2010 and 2011), Ecuador (in 2010), and Peru (in 2010 and 2011). All matches are played at the Estadio Mansiche in Trujillo, the home stadium of the Universidad César Vallejo.

=== 2013 Bolivarian Games ===
The Trujillo 2013 Bolivarian Games (Spanish: Juegos Bolivarianos), officially the XVII Bolivarian Games, were a major international multi-sport event that will be held from November 16–30, 2013 in Trujillo city. The commission of the Bolivarian Sports Organization (ODEBO) traveled to the city in early 2011 to make a visual inspection of its facilities, the review found that Trujillo has good conditions to develop the games, so the city will host the Bolivarian Games of 2013, confirmation of this headquarters was made public on February 7, 2011, in Rio de Janeiro. Approximately 5,000 athletes from 11 or 12 nations are expected to participate in 36 sports.

== Parks and green zones ==
- The Mansiche Alameda, located in the historic "old entrance of Mansiche" that was part of the ancient city wall, in the historic area of the monumental center of Trujillo. The place has a set of very old trees and is the venue for cultural presentations.
- Trujillo Botanical Garden, located on America Sur Avenue near the Larco roundabout, just south of the Historic Center of Trujillo. It houses a large number of different plants of the coastal, Andes highlands and jungle regions. This botanical garden preserves species such as "pallar mochero" (a variety of Lima Bean), several cotton varieties, and many other plants. The garden also houses a great variety of birds that have taken residence, attracted by the floral diversity.
- Swamps of Huanchaco

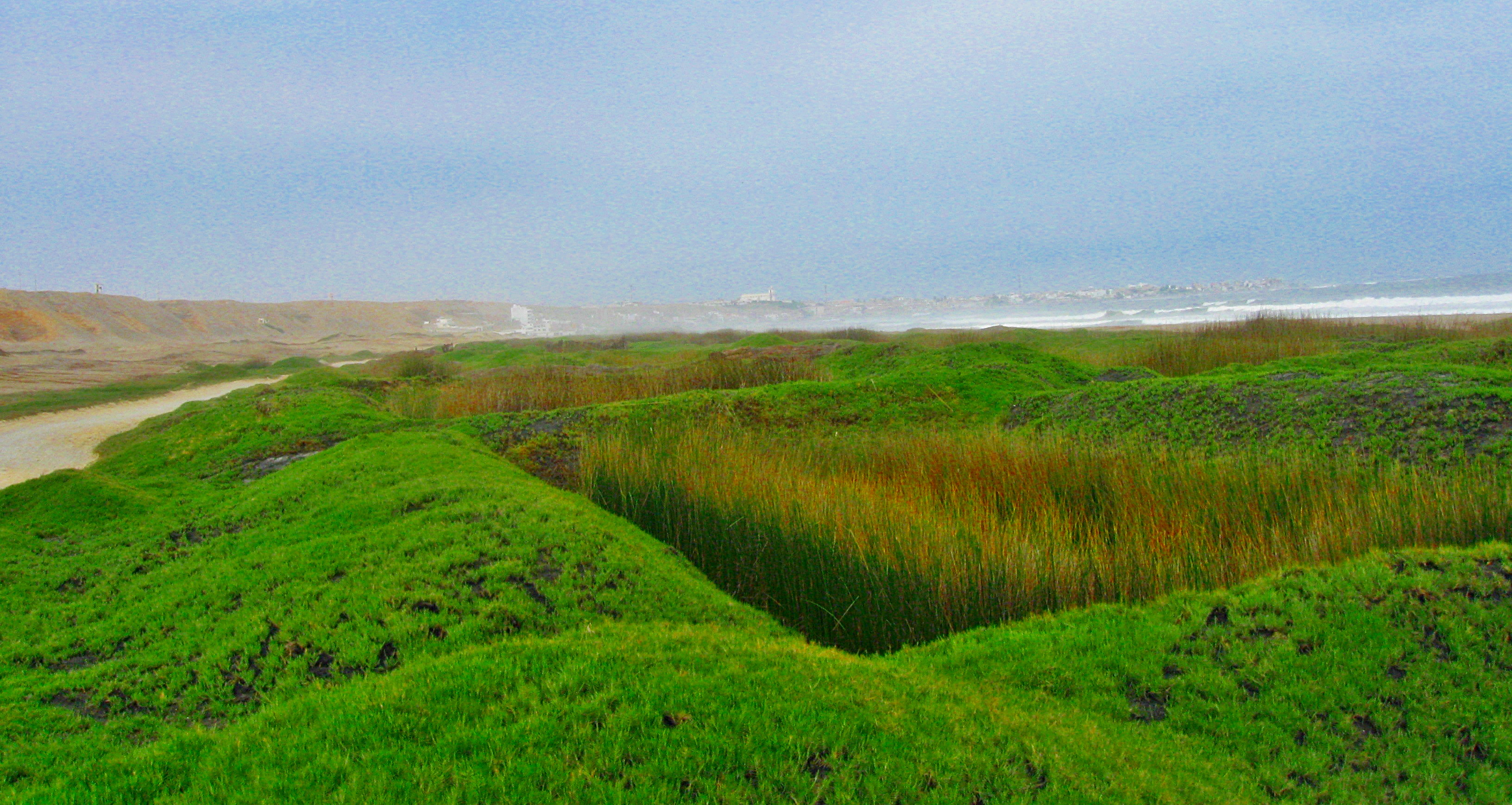
Swamps of Huanchaco is an ecological Chimu reserve, about 14 km (9 mi) northwest of the historic center of Trujillo city, Peru. From this ecological reserve the ancient mochica extracted the raw material for the manufacture of the legendary Caballitos de totora used since the time of the Moche for fishing. It is seen very close the waves of the ocean and far away the mythic town of Huanchaco.

Also known as Wetlands of Huanchaco is an ecological Chimu reserve located in Huanchaco Beach, about 14 kilometres (8.7 miles) northwest of Trujillo city, Peru. From this ecological reserve the ancient mochica extracted the raw material for the manufacture of the ancient Caballitos de totora used since the time of the Moche for fishing. Currently Huanchaco fishermen still use their materials from this swamps to make their ships of work.

== Notable people ==
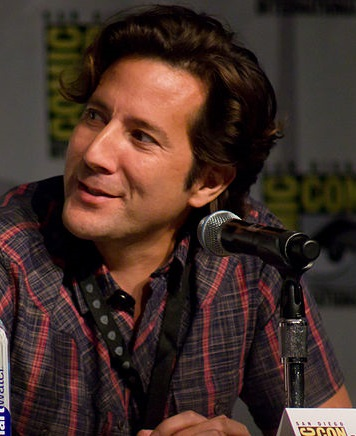
Henry Ian Cusick, Emmy-nominated actor born in Trujillo.

- César Vallejo, poet, lived in Trujillo from 1910 to 1917.
- Antenor Orrego, first Peruvian political philosopher, lived in Trujillo from 1910 to 1940.
- Víctor Raúl Haya de la Torre, political leader who founded the American Popular Revolutionary Alliance (APRA) in 1924.

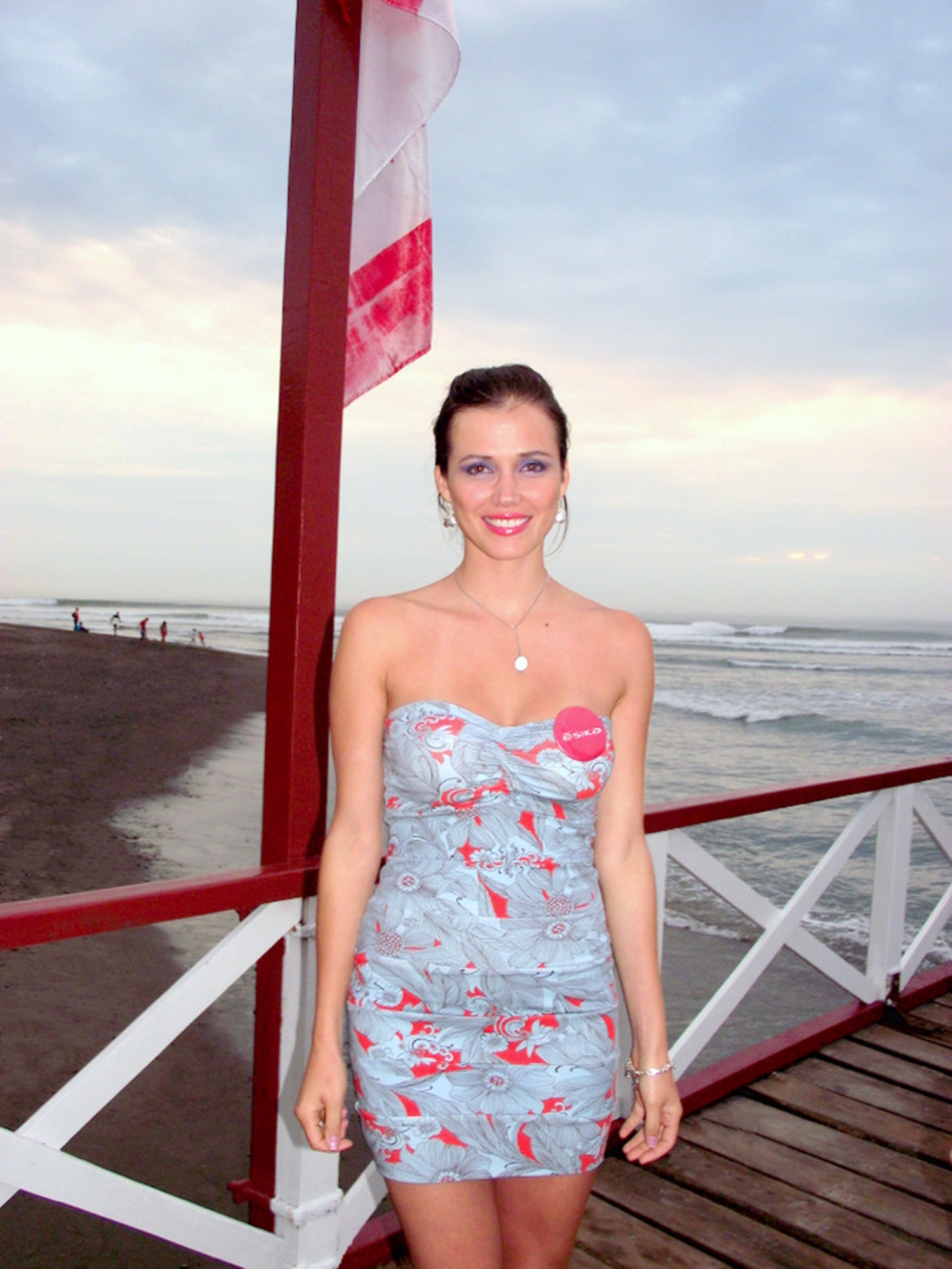
María Julia Mantilla, Miss World 2004.

- Maria Julia Mantilla, Miss Peru World 2004, Miss World 2004
- Henry Ian Cusick, Emmy-nominated actor.
- Gerardo Chávez, artist of Trujillo.
- Eduardo Gonzalez Viaña, writer author of novel "Vallejo en los Infiernos".
- Pedro Azabache Bustamante, he was an Indigenist and Costumbrist painter who also founded School of fine arts Macedonio de La Torre in Trujillo.
- Guillermo Larco Cox, engineer and politician.
- Victor Larco Herrera, politician and philanthropist.
- Víctor Felipe Calderón Valeriano, a master of marinera dance.
- Carmen de Pinillos, writer, editor, translator
- Christian Cueva, Peruvian footballer
- José Carlos Fernández (Peruvian footballer), Peruvian footballer
- Envy Peru, Winner of Drag Race Holland Season 1
- Orlando Romero, professional boxer and restaurateur

== Sister cities ==
- Trujillo, Spain
- Salt Lake City, United States
- Metepec, Mexico
- Decatur, United States
- Trujillo, Venezuela
- Timișoara, Romania
- Trujillo, Honduras

== See also ==
- Historic Centre of Trujillo
- Chan Chan
- Huanchaco
- Chimu
- Pacasmayo beach
- Plaza de Armas of Trujillo
- Plaza El Coliseo
- Moche
- Víctor Larco Herrera district
- Vista Alegre
- Buenos Aires
- Las Delicias beach
- Independence of Trujillo
- Wall of Trujillo
- Santiago de Huamán
- Lake Conache
- Marinera Festival
- Trujillo Spring Festival
- Wetlands of Huanchaco
- Salaverry beach
- Puerto Morín
- Virú culture
- Marcahuamachuco
- Wiracochapampa
