= Guaripola =

In the Peruvian city of Trujillo, a Guaripola is a young woman who leads a band of musicians in a parade. She often juggles and gives a show of dancing and acrobatic maneuvering using a bar or stick, called a guaripola.

== History ==
The first Trujillo Spring Festival was held in 1950. Some of the most appreciated participants in the festival each year are the "Guaripolas". The Guaripolas animate the principal parade and give artistic presentations in several locations in the city.

== Description ==
The Guaripola is generally a young girl who leads every band of musicians in the principal parade for the Spring Festival. She dresses in a one-piece swimsuit and uses a bar of metal during her performance. The festival presents approximately 10 Guaripolas, with each one giving an independent show (dancing and acrobatic maneuvering with a bar or stick called guaripola) with a band. The parade lasts about 3 hours.

Guaripolas at the Trujillo Spring Festival
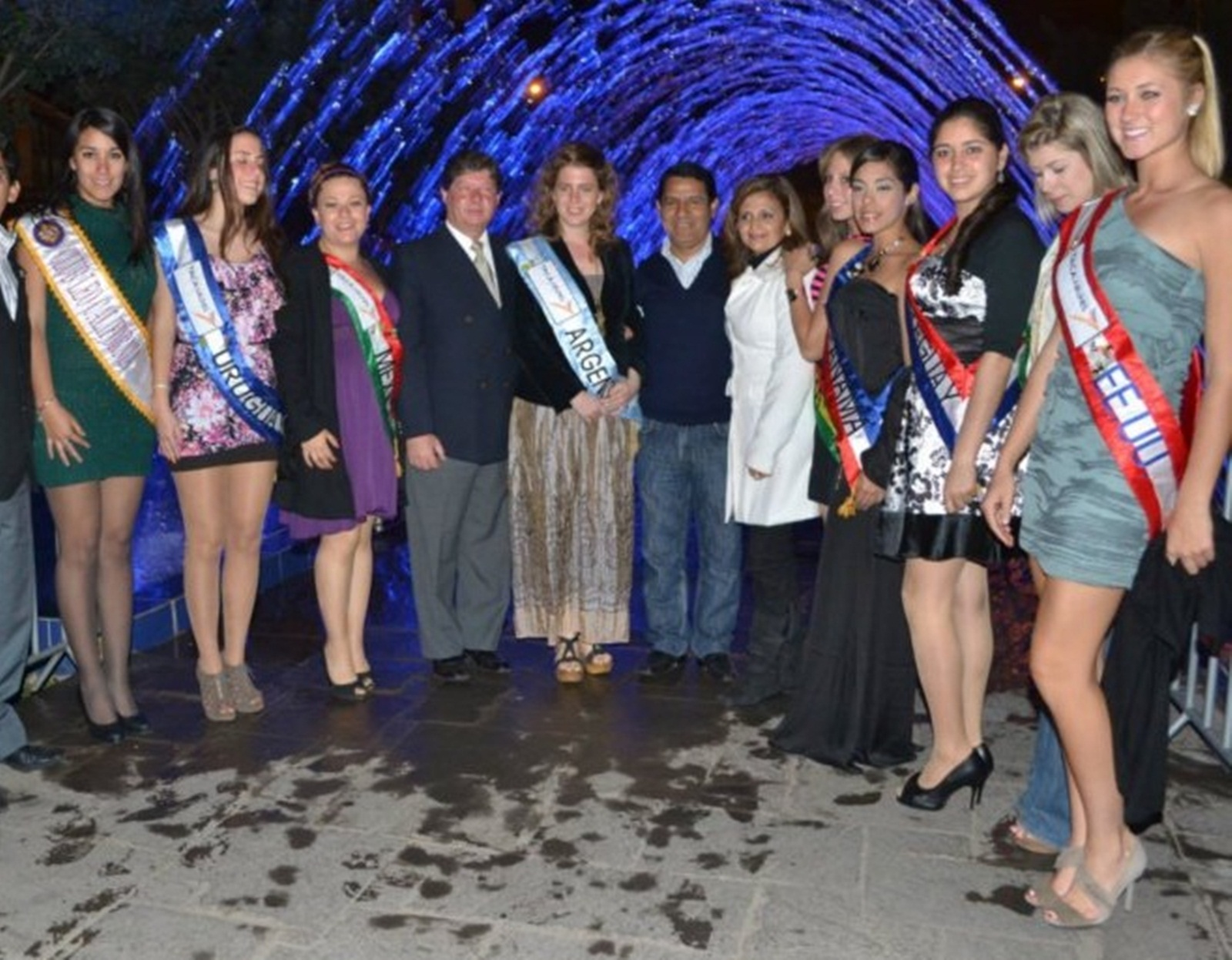
Guaripolas and Queens of Spring in the Paseo de Aguas in Víctor Larco District

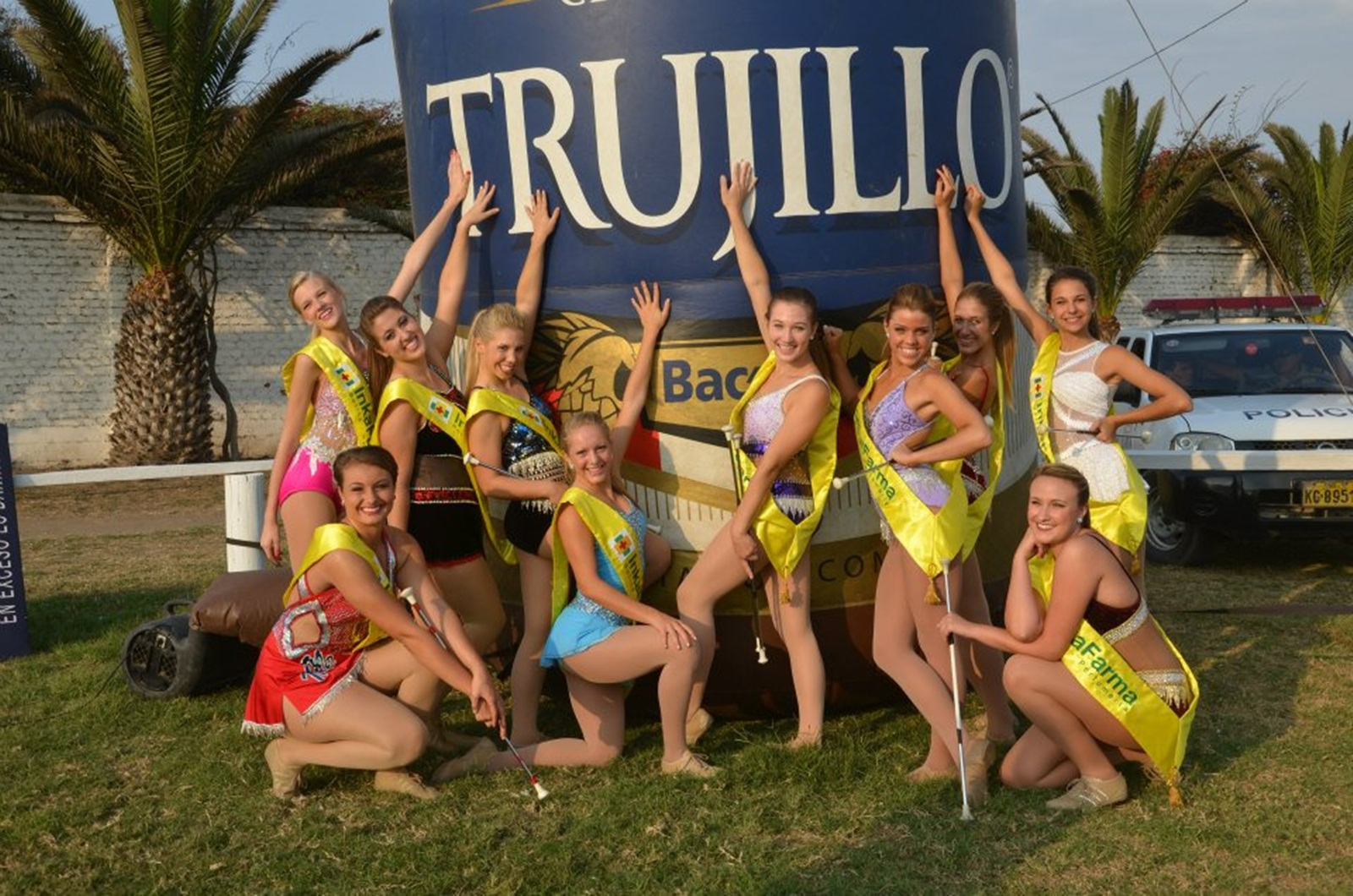
Guaripolas in Trujillo Spring Festival

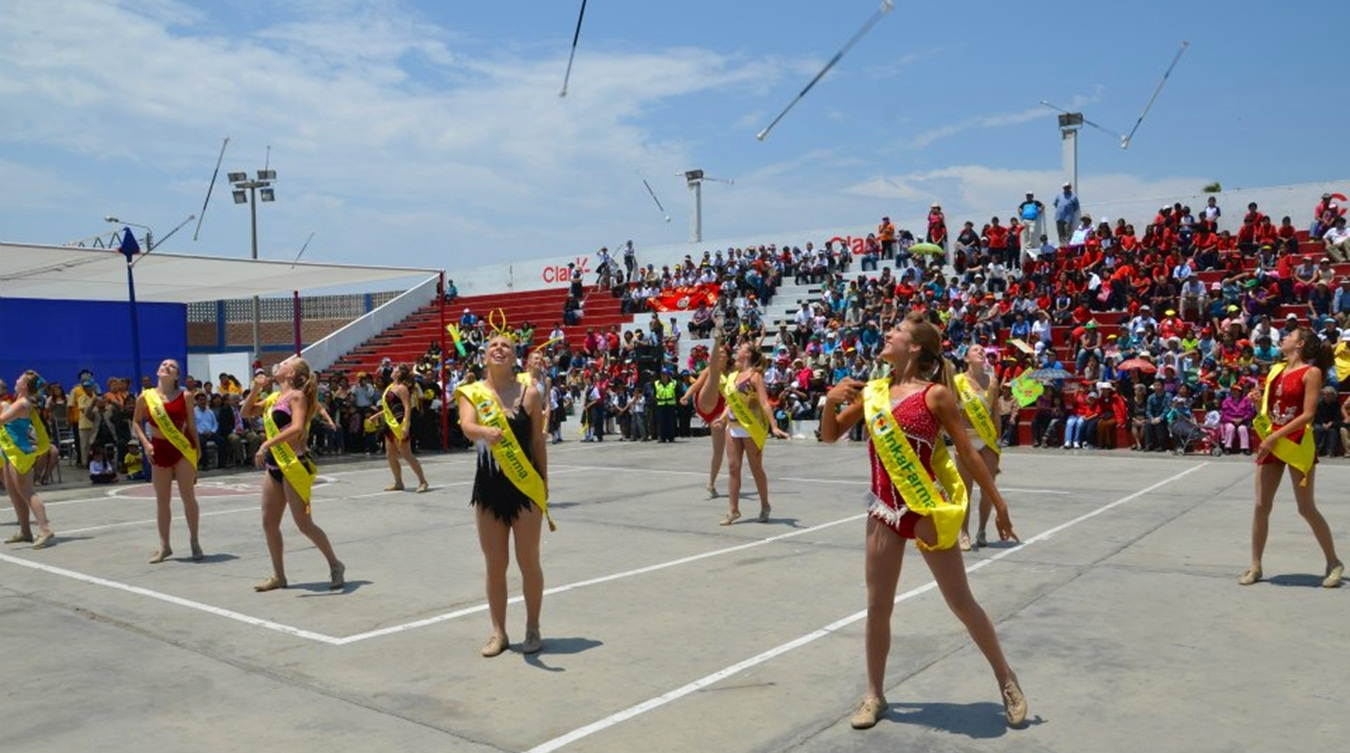
Guaripolas in a show

== See also ==
- Trujillo Spring Festival
- Trujillo Marinera Festival
- Majorette
