= UCV =

UCV may refer to:

== Higher education ==
- University of Cape Verde
- University of Craiova
  - Universitatea Craiova, a football team
- Central University of Venezuela
- Cesar Vallejo University

== Others ==
- UCV Television
- United Confederate Veterans
- Club Deportivo Universidad César Vallejo
