= Róger David Torres Mendoza =

Peruvian police officer

Róger David Torres Mendoza is a Peruvian Police officer born on January 26 in the resort of Buenos Aires located in Victor Larco, La Libertad Region, and in January 2012 he was appointed by the Ministry of Interior of the Peruvian government as head of the Direction Territorial of Police of La Libertad (DIRTEPOL) based in the city of Trujillo.

Born in Buenos Aires he took studies in School of Officers of National Police of Peru. In 2012 he was appointed by the Ministry of Interior of the Peruvian government as head of the Direction Territorial of Police of La Libertad based in the city of Trujillo and from January till November 2012 his command could reduce the number of detective actions in the city.

== See also ==
- Trujillo Spring Festival
- Marinera
- Victor Larco Herrera district
- Larco Avenue
