= Ozono Television =

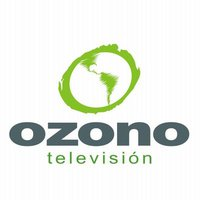
- Type: Broadcast television network
- Branding: Ozono TV
- Country: Peru
- First air date: August 23, 2008
- Availability: National(Peru)
- Founded: August 23, 2008 by Publicidad Sónica EIRL
- Headquarters: Trujillo, Peru
- Owner: Publicidad Sónica EIRL
- Established: August 23, 2008
- Analogue channel(s): NTSC 480i (SDTV)
- VHF: Channel 41 (Trujillo)
- VHF: Channel 53 (Trujillo)

Ozono Television is a television broadcast channel (Channel 41) in Trujillo city in northern Peru. It was aired on August 23, 2008, and it is intended to be an information channel whose recurring theme is the care of the environment. Its programming also revolves around music and ecology. It has been distinguished as the first television channel in Trujillo and one of the first in Peru to address environmental issues in much of its programming.

== History ==
Besides the Business Creativity Award, won in 2004 with Radio Ozone project, the channel has achieved recognition locally and nationally. Remarkably, in 2011, the Provincial Municipality of Trujillo (MPT), the United Nations Environment Programme (UNEP) and the Environmental Management Service Trujillo (SEGAT) gave to Ozono TV a recognition for their participation in the report "ECCO Trujillo : Perspectives of Environment and Climate Change," and served to the formulation of the project "Environmental Plan of Trujillo Province."

== See also ==
- Trujillo
- Victor Larco District
