= Paseo de Aguas, Trujillo =

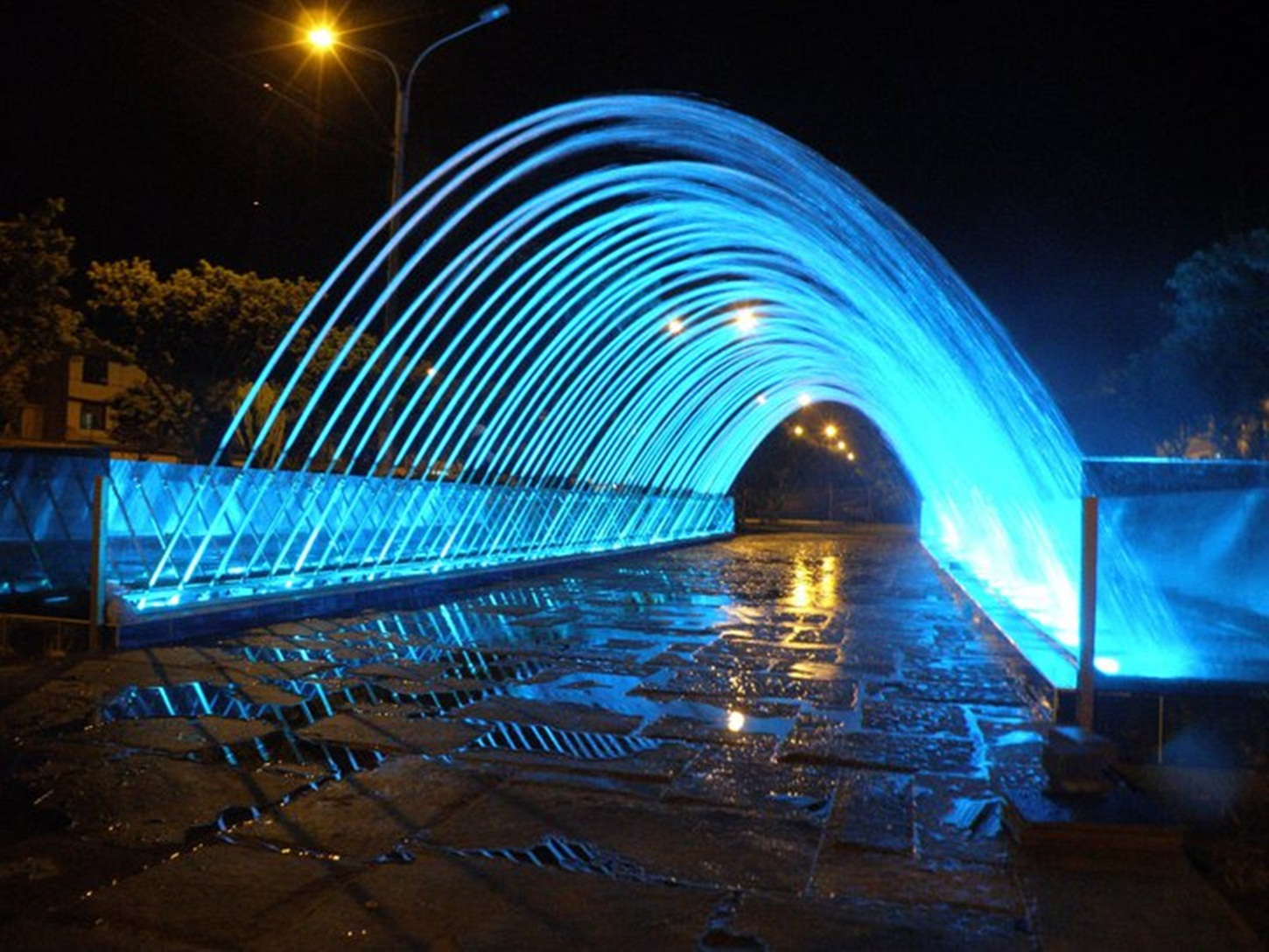
Tunnel of Wishes in the Paseo de Aguas

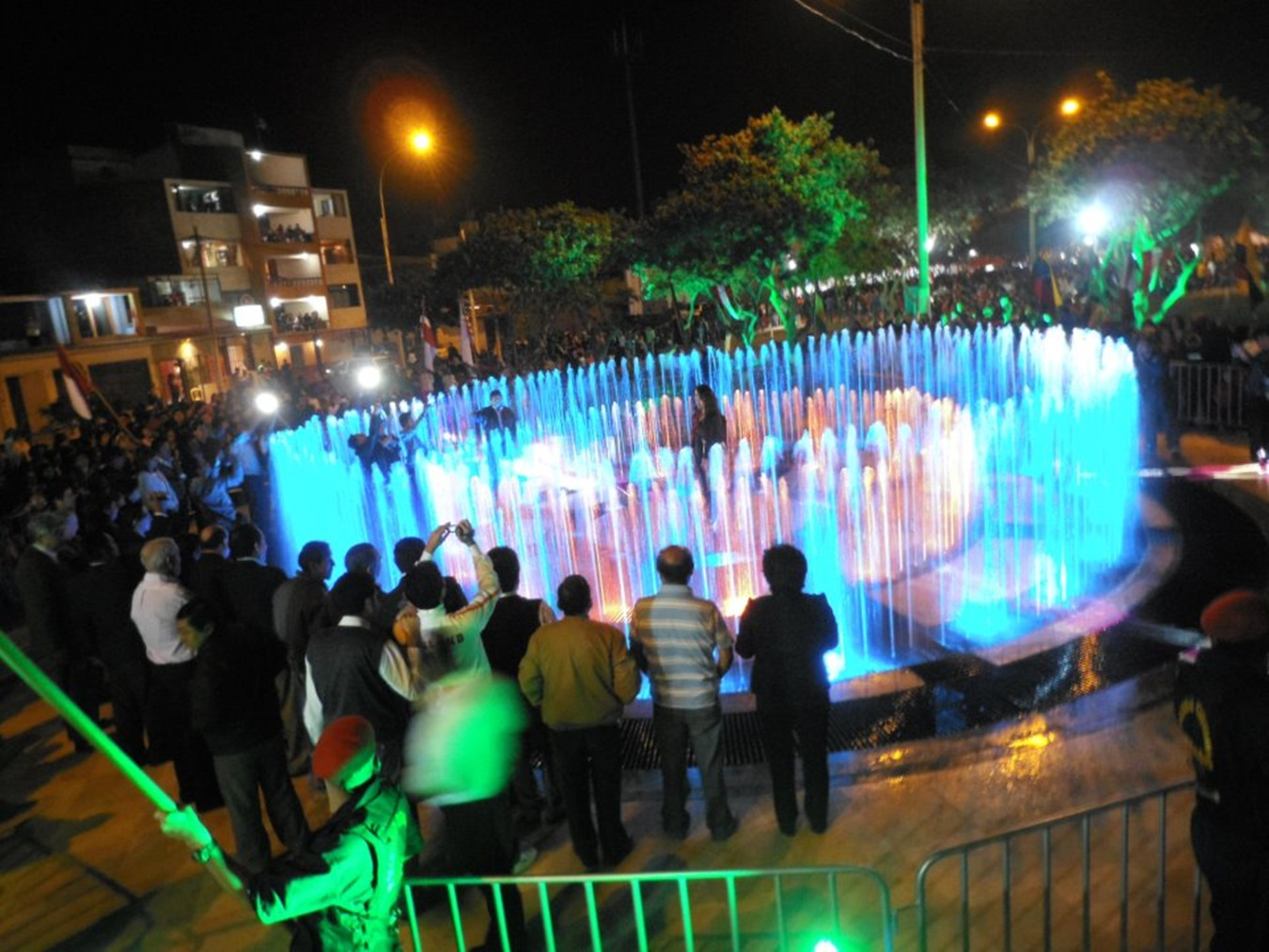
Pool fun in the Paseo de Aguas

The Paseo de Aguas is a tourist boulevard in Trujillo city in northern Peru. One of its main attractions is the Tunnel of Wishes, formed by arches of water with multicolor effects. It also has a round pool with multicolored jets of water arranged in circular form with spaces where people can walk into the pool. It is located at the intersection of Larco with Victor Raul Haya de la Torre avenues, near Cesar Vallejo University.

== Description ==
It is located in Victor Larco district at 17th block of Larco avenue and it was built in 2011 in its first stage. In the Paseo de Aguas are held events like concerts, food festivals, etc. It is visited by people of Trujillo city mainly.

== See also ==
- Historic Centre of Trujillo
- Chan Chan
- Huanchaco
- Puerto Chicama
- Chimu
- Pacasmayo beach
- Plaza de Armas of Trujillo
- Moche
- Víctor Larco Herrera District
- Vista Alegre
- Buenos Aires
- Las Delicias beach
- Independence of Trujillo
- Wall of Trujillo
- Santiago de Huamán
- Lake Conache
- Marinera Festival
- Trujillo Spring Festival
- Wetlands of Huanchaco
- Association of Breeders and Owners of Paso Horses in La Libertad
- Salaverry beach
- Puerto Morín
- Virú culture
- Marcahuamachuco
- Wiracochapampa
