= Víctor Felipe Calderón Valeriano =

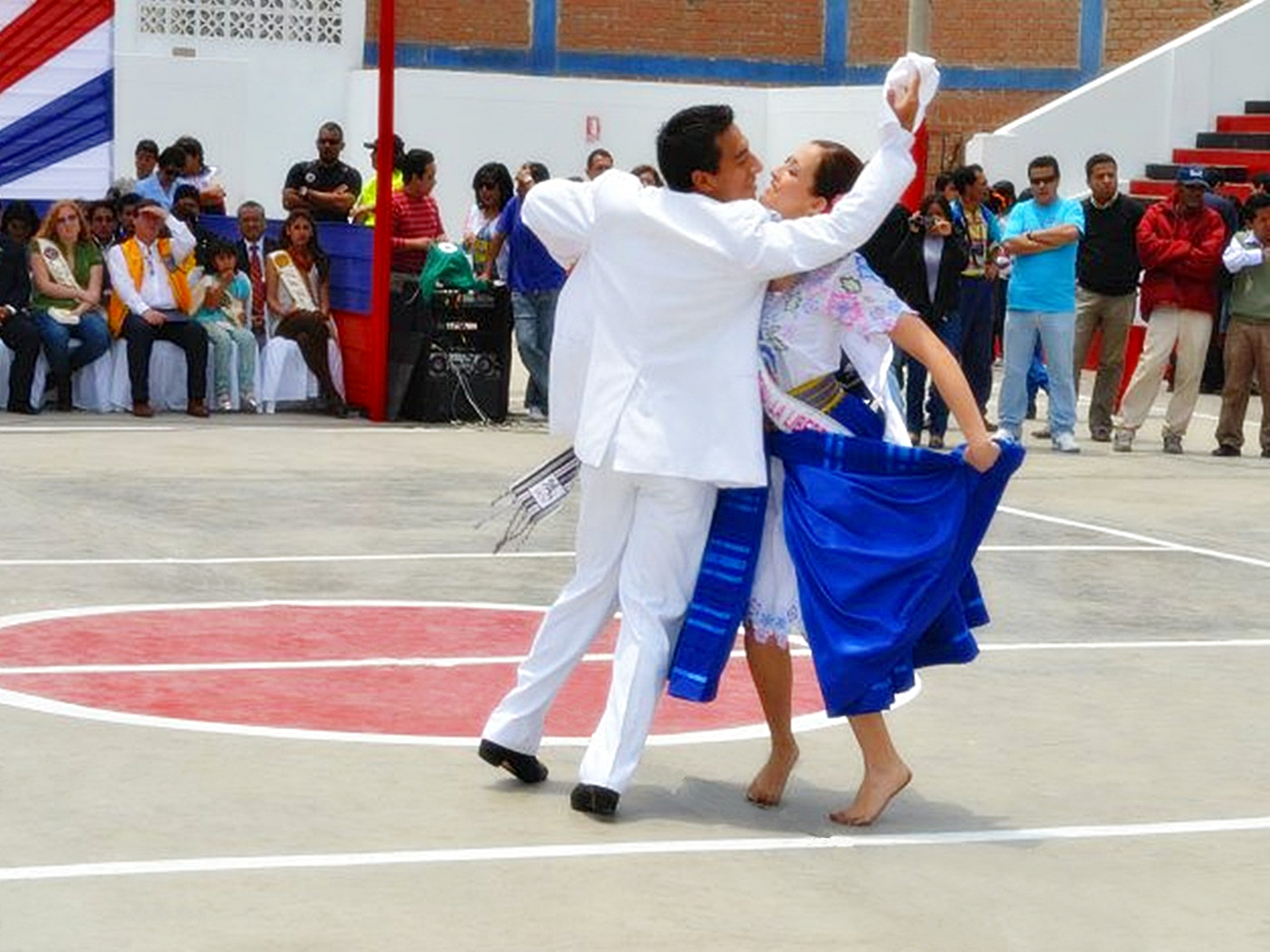
Victor Calderon is a master of marinera dance in Víctor Larco Herrera

Víctor Felipe Calderón Valeriano also known as Victor "El Chino Calderón", is a master of marinera dance in Victor Larco District and Trujillo city. He has over 42 years devoted entirely to the cultivation of this dance and he is teaching people from different parts of the region and country the living culture of Trujillo city. In Buenos Aires North is located his Cultural Centre of Marinera which is an academy of dance where Victor Calderon still teaches dancing pupils from different parts of the country.

== Biography ==
In 1970 was his first participation in the Marinera Festival, and in 1972 managed to get a second place. In 1975 he won the title in the adult category and it was his dance partner María Antonieta Meléndez de Aguilar.Victor Calderon, is also a teacher of physical education, and he takes the Marinera dance in his blood so much so that his academic thesis was about this dance. Among his pupils he had as student is the fashion designer Gerardo Privat Dextre, who was champion in the junior category in 1999 having as dance partner to Marial Luisa Lopez

== See also ==
- Trujillo Spring Festival
- Marinera
- Victor Larco Herrera district
- Larco Avenue
- Trujillo
