= Lord of Huaman Festival =

Patronal feast in Peru

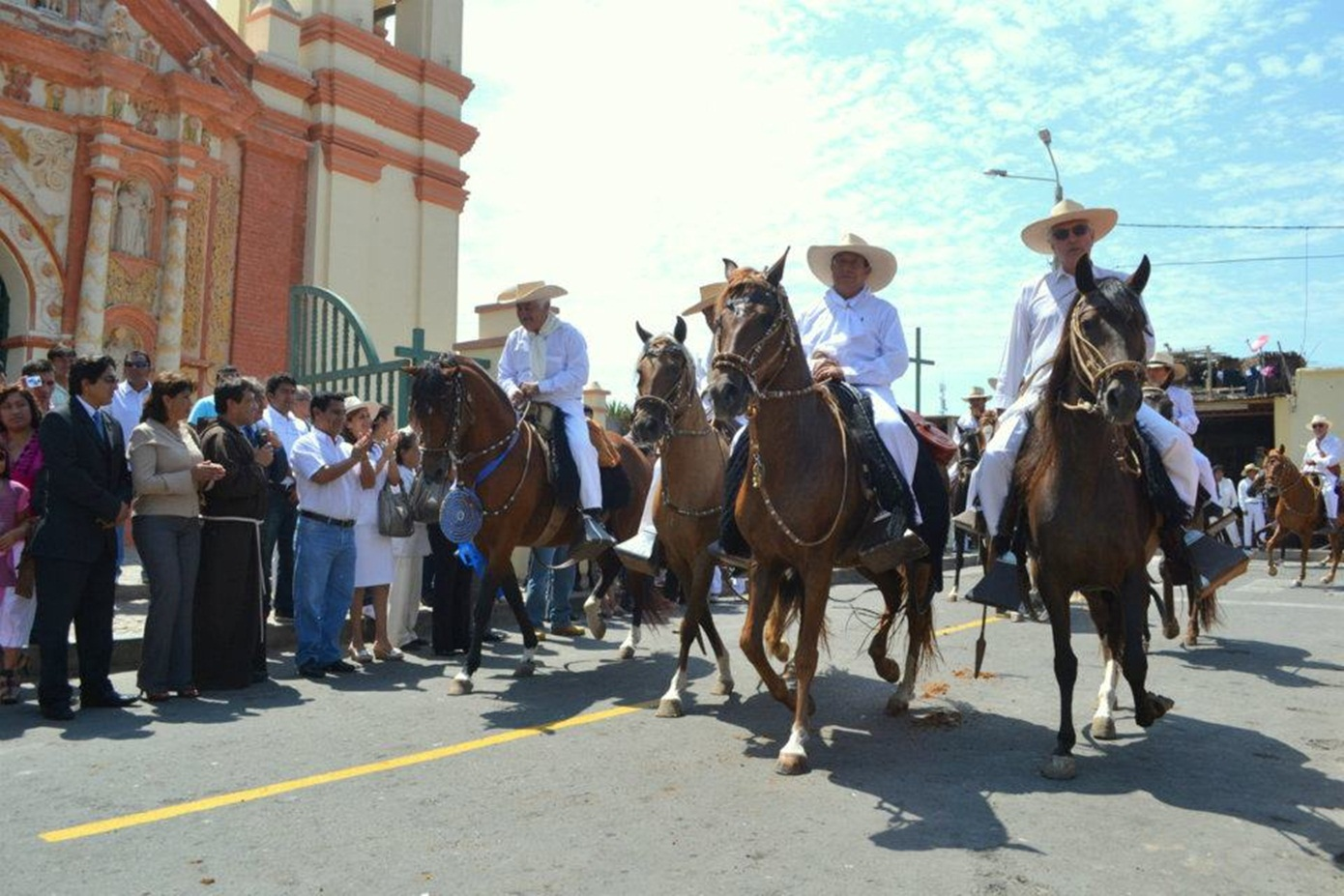
- Paso Horses in Huaman Festival
- Genre: Traditional and religious Festival
- Begins: End of May
- Ends: End of May
- Frequency: Annual
- Location: Santiago de Huamán (Trujillo city)
- Years active: 17th century – present
- Inaugurated: 17th century
- Most recent: 2012
- Participants: Christian people
- Patron: Lord of Huamán
- Festival more than 300 years old

Lord of Huaman Festival is a patronal feast celebrated every year in the Peruvian town of Santiago de Huamán, in the western part of the city of Trujillo. This Christian celebration has been held for more than 300 years.

== History ==
The origin of this tradition dates back more than 300 years. It is a religious festival that attracts pilgrims and tourists who visit the historic Church of Santiago de Huaman. The celebration of the festival takes place from 13 to 27 May in honor of the Lord of Huaman; novenas, rosaries and confessions are offered by the faithful devotees. The celebrations also include morning and afternoon sports. On the event's main day, special celebrations are performed including flag hoisting, a solemn mass held by the Archbishop of Trujillo, a procession with the sacred image and the entrance into the church with a band of musicians. According to tradition, some fishermen went to the beach formerly known as Playa Vieja, now known as La Bocana, and found three chests that they managed to pull to shore. In one of the chests they discovered a priest's clothes, in the second the clothes of a saint, and in the third the holy image of the Lord in parts. They took everything to the town where they assembled and dressed the sacred image. One of the seamen upon waking said, "Lord Huaman, save us!" and thus named the saint. When the Bishop of Trujillo learned of the discovery, he ordered the construction of a chapel at the site but it was destroyed. It was later rebuilt and again destroyed; the natives and fishermen then decided to build the church in the village of Huaman.

== Events ==
- The procession of the patron Lord of Huaman through the town streets. In the 2012 festival, the Lord of Huaman was taken in procession to the cathedral of Trujillo and was returned the same way to the sanctuary in Huamán.
- Morning and afternoon sports; in 2012 the festival included a marathon.
- Solemn mass held by the Archbishop of Trujillo.
- Makers of alfajores and other sweet foods from Trujillo and northern Peruvian cities come to the festival to sell several kinds of alfajores and foods. They place their stands around the Main Square of Huaman.

== See also ==
- Trujillo
- Marinera Festival
- Trujillo Spring Festival
- Trujillo Book Festival
- International Festival of Lyric Singing
- Carnival of Huanchaco
- Las Delicias beach
- Huanchaco
- Santiago de Huamán
- Victor Larco Herrera District
