= Majorette =

Dancer

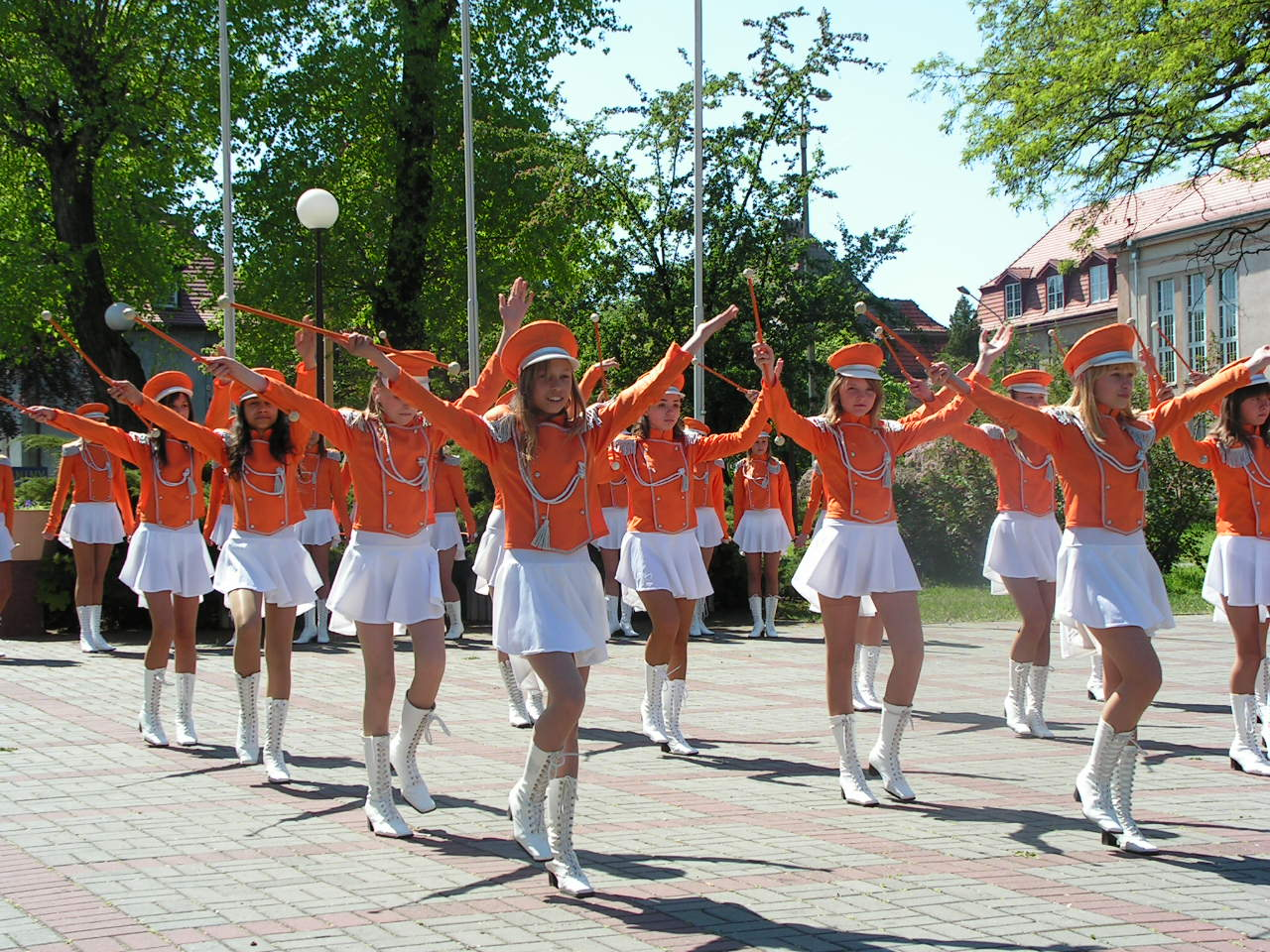
- Majorettes of the Brass Band of the "Głogów Copper Smelter", Poland

Occupation
- Names: Majorette
- Activity sectors: Entertainment, dance

Description
- Competencies: Hand–eye coordination, physical fitness
- Fields of employment: Marching bands, parades
- Related jobs: Cheerleader, dancer

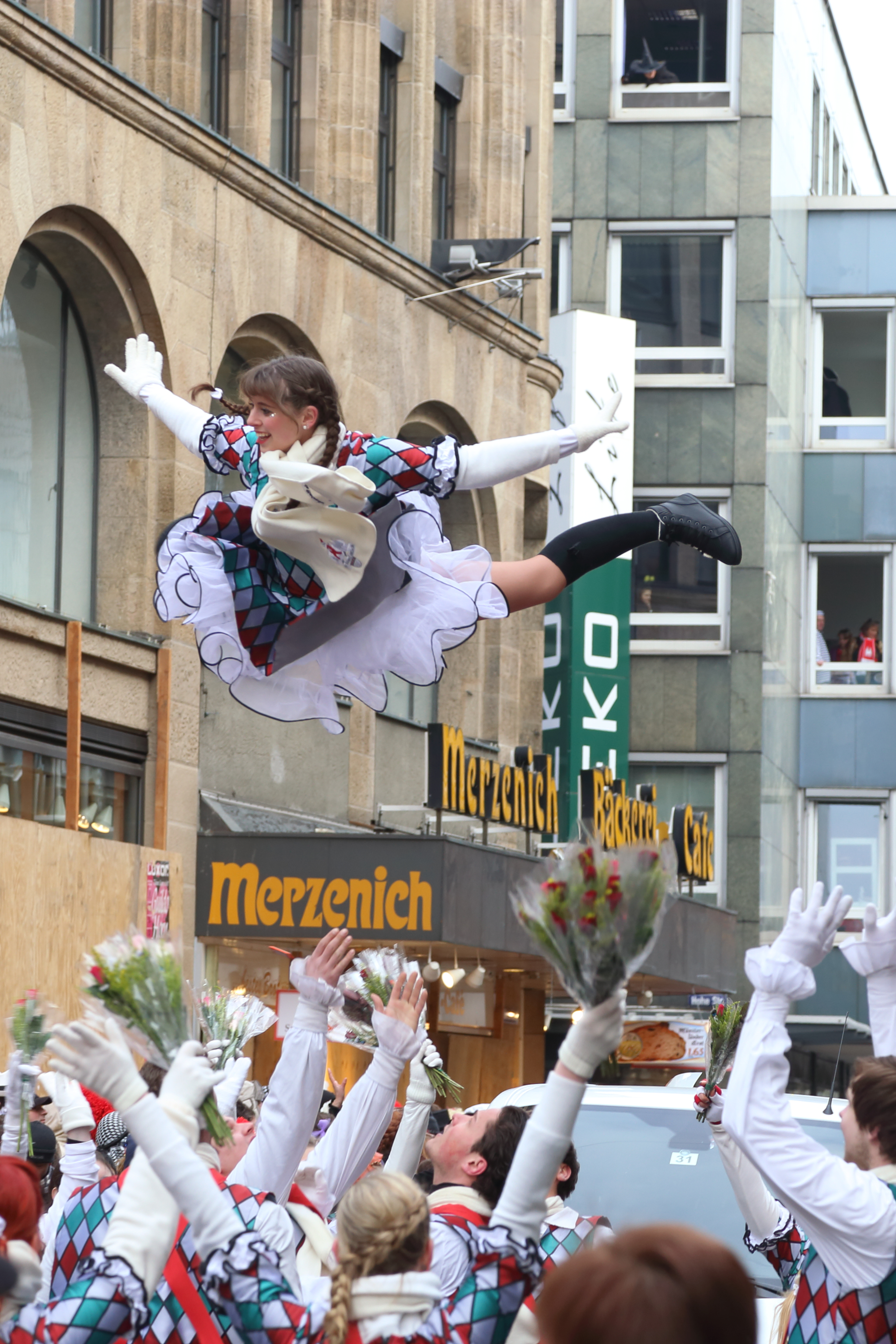
A ‘’Funkenmariechen’’ (ger. diminutive for “Glistering Mary”) majorette is lifted at Rose Monday Parade of the Cologne Carnival in Germany

A majorette is a traditionally female performer who combines baton twirling with dance movements, primarily associated with marching bands during parades. Majorettes may alternatively spin flags, fire batons, maces, or rifles. Some performers incorporate cartwheels and flips, while others may twirl multiple batons at once.

Majorettes are typically distinguished from cheerleaders, while baton twirling is closely related to rhythmic gymnastics.

== Origin and development ==
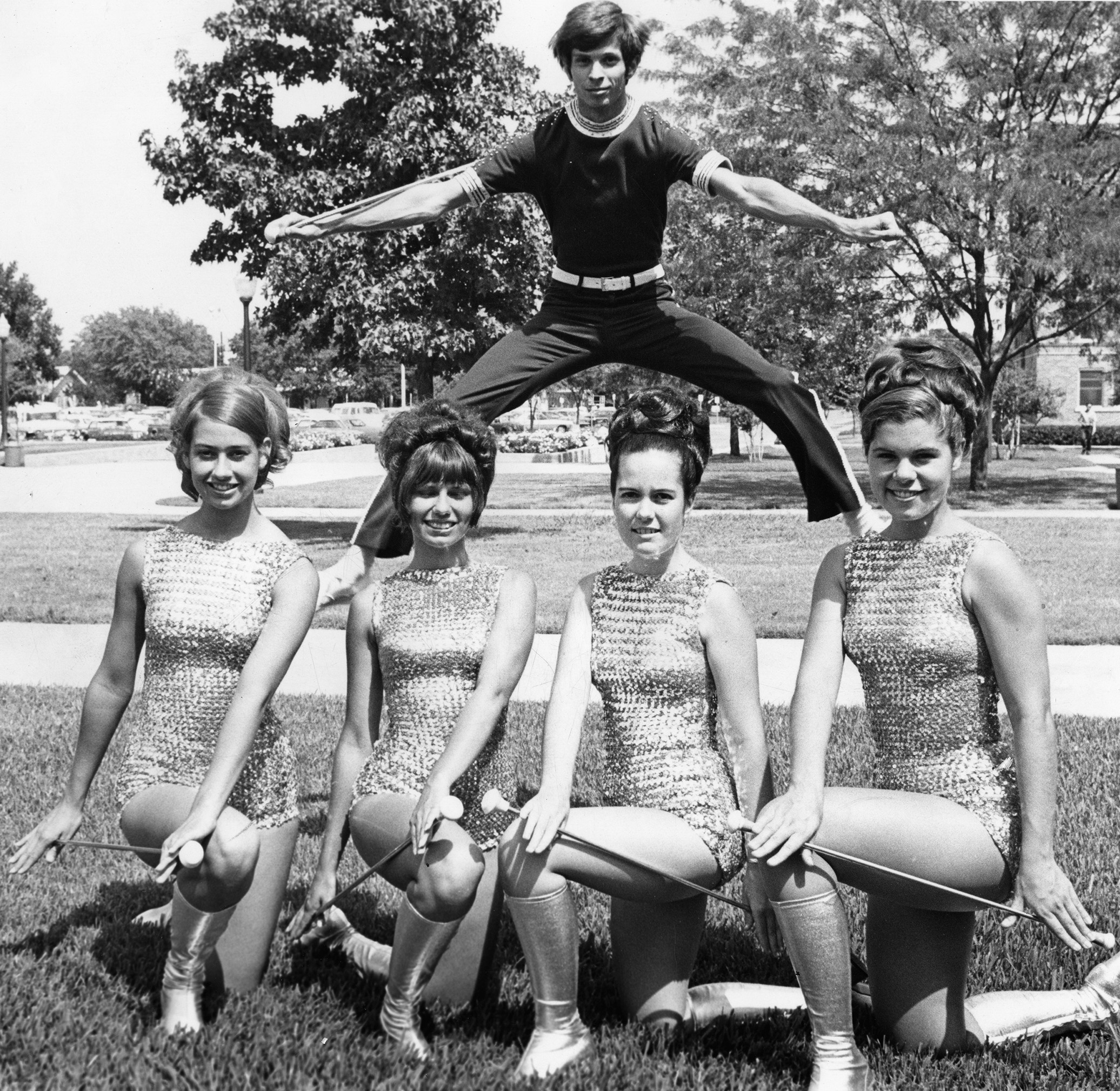
University of Texas at Arlington majorettes, circa 1960s

Majorettes originally performed a typical carnival dance originating in the Rhineland, where the young women who perform this dance are called Tanzmariechen (Dance Marys) in German or Dansmarietjes in Dutch.

During the carnival, the normal form of government was parodied. Also the army and defense forces were traditionally parodied as a way of protesting against the Prussian occupation of the Rhenish area at the time. In Cologne, these imitations arose in particular to make Prussian militarism look ridiculous.

The Tanzmariechen show clear origins in the camp followers in the 18th and 19th century, and have a vibrant and eventful past. Around this time, Germany had a large number of armies, and in each regiment there were women and girls selling and providing food and drink and taking on chores like washing clothes. Many also offered themselves as prostitutes.

Around 1800, more regulations began to emerge in the armies, which were gradually applied to the camp followers as well. Increasingly, camp followers were women married to corporals or privates, with tasks like washing the linen. They became no longer typical army prostitutes but also not proper married women. Besides caring for the soldiers, they could still continue entertaining them in various ways.

In the carnival mockery, both officers and camp followers were depicted: the officer as an effeminate, wig-wearing, conceited fool, and the camp followers as women who were militarily but provocatively costumed, and also clearly recognizable as a man: the Tanzmarie.

In the late 19th century, the carnival associations found further inspiration in the revue girls performing in theaters at the time. They were scantily clad young women, accompanied by military attributes like peak helmets and military backpacks, dancing provocatively in small groups. The revue girls became nightclub-like stars. It cannot be denied that the carnival with its Tanzmariechen has popularized and even parodied the sparkling shows that could otherwise be enjoyed only in the major European cities.

During the post-war carnival, young women and girls again took on the role of Tanzmariechen instead of men and performed in parades. A show element was added to carnival, partly because of rapidly evolving ballet education. Majorettes or Tanzmariechen increasingly began to act in groups. Some parts of the Prussian military background are sometimes still reflected today in the majorettes' movements, music, or clothing.

The somewhat slovenly camp followers who accompanied the troops have evolved into a show dance group, but still inspired by the Prussian army. This metamorphosis went through the intermediate step of the role performed by men as Tanzmarie. Although current majorettes have their roots in the carnival scene, majorette associations widely break these historical ties, appearing more as sports or dance clubs.

== Fictional majorettes ==
- Jetta Handover (Kath Soucie) from the TV series Clifford the Big Red Dog.
- Adrian Lee (Francia Raisa) from the TV series The Secret Life of the American Teenager.
- Vicky from the horror movie The Majorettes.
- Sakura Kinomoto from the anime series Cardcaptor Sakura.
- Bunty Carmichael (Catherine Tate) from the TV series The Catherine Tate Show.
- Aqua (Willa Holland) from the video game Kingdom Hearts: Birth By Sleep performs a baton twirling routine with her Keyblade when she uses the "Break Time" command. In the version that appears in Kingdom Hearts HD 2.5 Remix (based on the "Final Mix" version), doing this results in earning the "Majorette" trophy.
- Haruna Morikawa (森川 はるな, Morikawa Haruna)/Pink Turbo (ピンクターボ, Pinku Tābo) from Kousoku Sentai Turboranger.
- Frankie Bergstein from Grace and Frankie. Mentioned in Season 2 Episode 4.
Trujillo Spring Festival
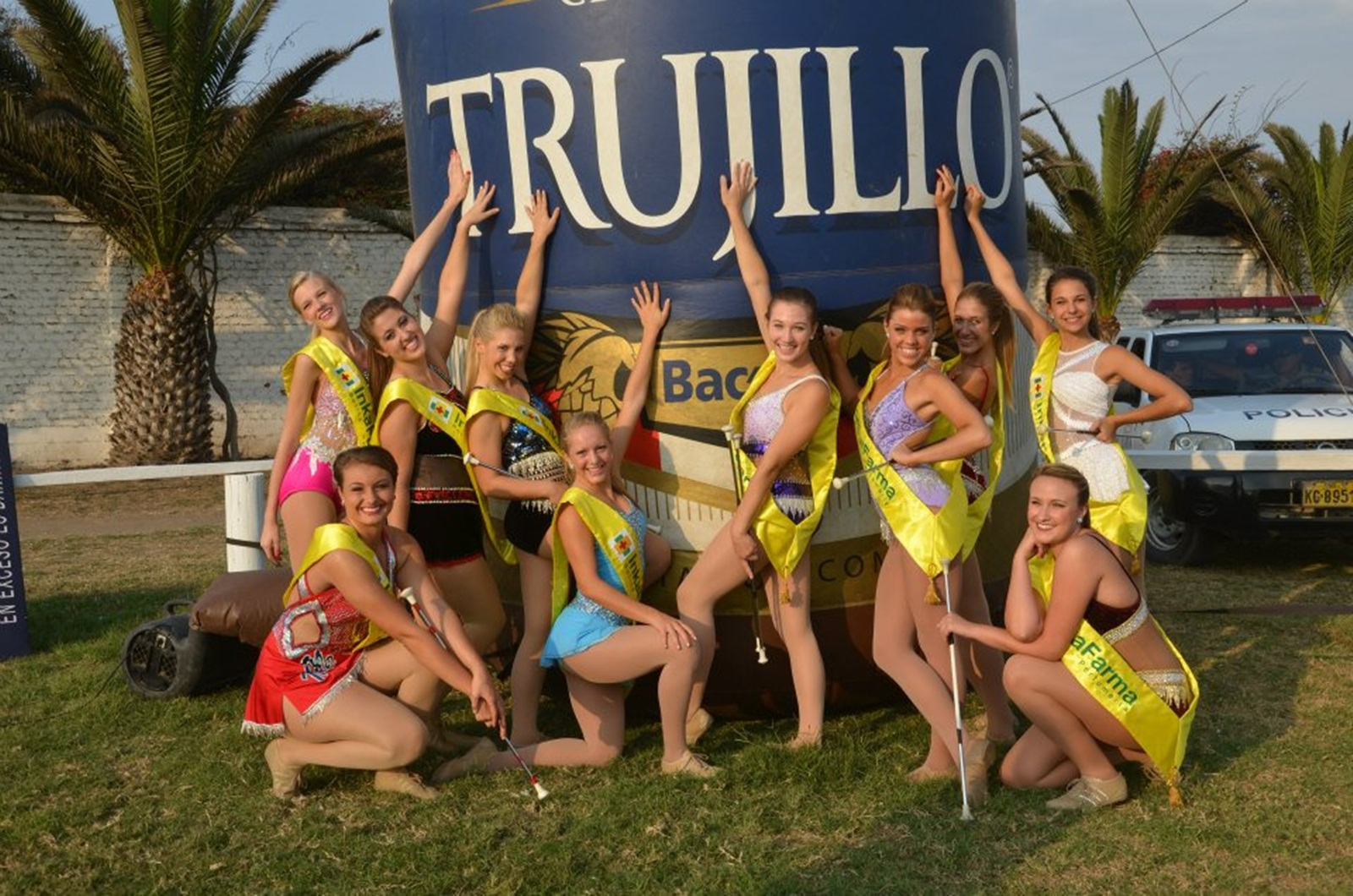
Majorettes in Trujillo city are called ‘’Guaripolas’’ during Spring Festival

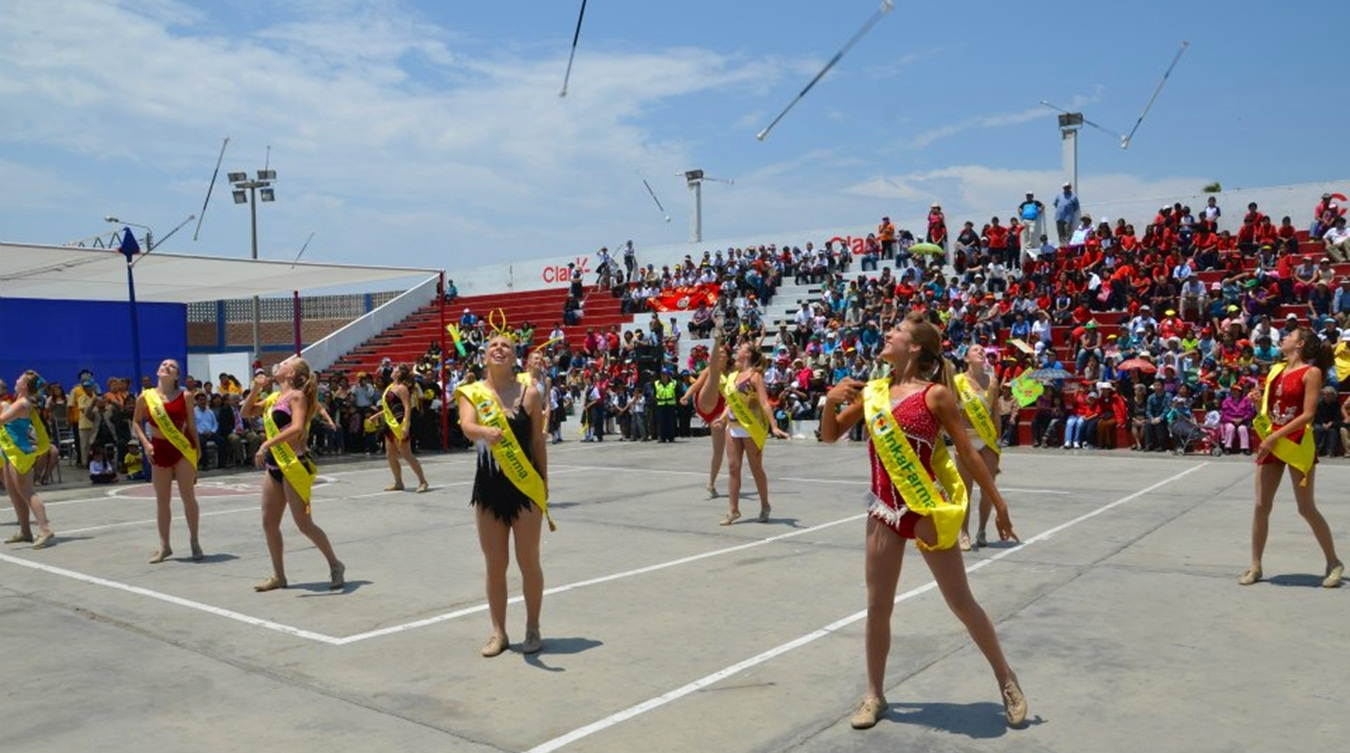
Majorettes or Guaripolas in a show in Víctor Larco

== HBCU Majorette dance ==
Historically black college or university (HBCU) majorette dance first started in 1968. The first performance was introduced at the orange blossom classic by a majorette dance team named The Golden Girls. The Alcorn State university golden girls took majorette dance to a different level. The team had a mixture of jazz, ballet, and later hip hop all in one. The performance had a great outcome and made an impact on majorette dance forever. Today they are known for their bright outfits, kick lines, tricks, and song selections. HBCU majorette dance is now a huge tradition to HBCU culture and even black culture. Almost 55 years after that December 1968 game, majorette culture has grown in popularity from Tik-Tok trends to being featured in Vice President Kamala Harris inauguration procession.

== See also ==
- Cheerleader – Athletic activity based on cheering for a team
- Pep flags – Performing art of twirling flags
- Color guard – Performers
- Dance squad – Team that competes in competitive dance
- Marching band – Company of instrumental musicians
- Rangerette – Precision dance team from Texas, US
