= UCV Satelital =

Peruvian television network

- Type: Broadcast television network
- Branding: UCV Satelital
- Country: Peru
- First air date: July 15, 2003
- Availability: Regional (Peru)
- Founded: July 15, 2003 by Cesar Acuña Peralta
- Headquarters: Victor Larco District, Peru
- Owner: Cesar Vallejo University
- Established: July 15, 2003
- Analogue channel: NTSC 480i (SDTV)
- VHF: Channel 15 (Trujillo)
- VHF: Channel 45 (Chiclayo)
- VHF: Channel 57 (Chimbote)
- VHF): Channel 49 (Iquitos)
- VHF: Channel 49 (Piura)
- Official website: UCV Satelital (in Spanish)

UCV Satelital is a Peruvian television network with regular broadcasts since 2003 and belongs to the Cesar Vallejo University. Emits its signal from Victor Larco District of Trujillo city and some programs are in their respective affiliates in other cities of northern Peru.

== History ==
This channel gets its approval by Ministerial Resolution No 617 - 2002/MTC, signed by Deputy Minister of Communications, Távara José Martín, was awarded to the UCV for permission to install the service channel broadcasting in UHF television commercial. The resolution stated: "To grant the Universidad César Vallejo SAC, authorization and installation permit for a period of ten years, which includes installation and testing period of twelve months, to operate a service station commercial television broadcasting UHF, in the district of Victor Larco, Trujillo province and the department of La Libertad, the same that will air on Channel 49 (UCV / TV)."

== See also ==
- Cesar Vallejo University
- Trujillo
- Victor Larco District
