= Avenida Larco (Trujillo) =

Coordinates: 8.1225°S 79.0371°W

Larco Avenue
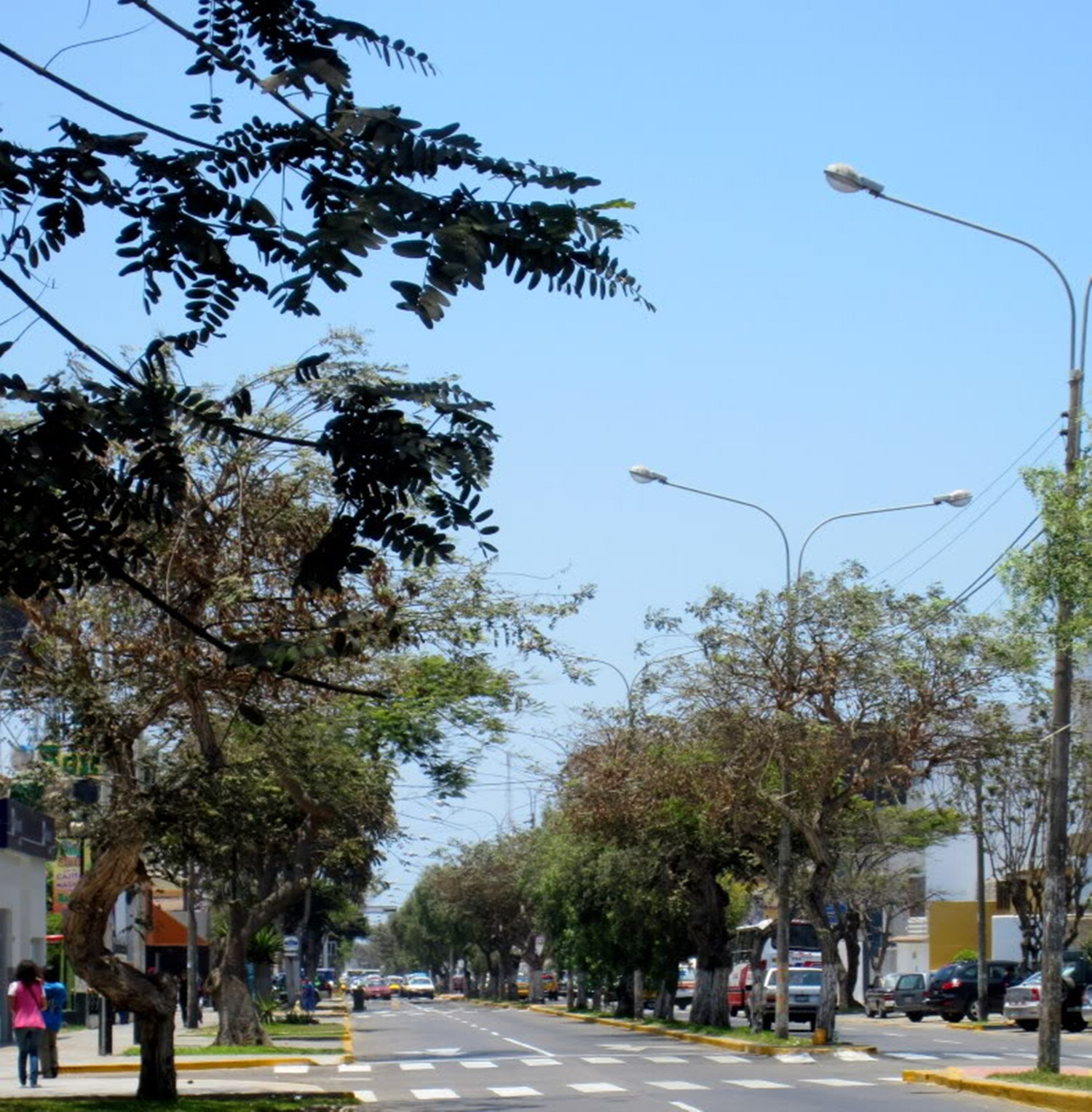
- Larco avenue in Trujillo city
- Interactive map of Larco Avenue
- Location: Trujillo
- From: Buenos Aires beach (West)
- To: España Avenue, in the Historic Centre of Trujillo

Víctor Larco Herrera Avenue (Spanish: Avenida Víctor Larco Herrera) is one of the main avenues of Trujillo city, located on the north coast of Peru. Named after the famous philanthropist Victor Larco Herrera by this via urbanistically joins Trujillo and Víctor Larco districts. It is the main via of Victor Larco and one of the most important in Trujillo. It begins in the west of the city and starts from the resort of Buenos Aires and runs till the Historic Centre of Trujillo, covers many blocks which have numerous shopping centers, of education, health, regional government agencies, etc.

== Main institutions ==
- Municipality of Víctor Larco Herrera, in the zone of Buenos Aires.
- Cesar Vallejo University, on the block 17.
- UCV Satelital located in front of Cesar Vallejo University.
- SUNARP (National Superintendency of Public Registries).
- RENIEC (National Registry of Identification and Civil status), in the intersection with Ayacucho street in Vista Alegre.

== Localities joined by Larco avenue ==
- Buenos Aires
- Vista Alegre
- Historic Centre of Trujillo
- San Andrés V
- California
- San Andres I
- Los Pinos
- La Merced

== Tourístic points ==
- Buenos Aires beach (West)
- Historic Centre of Trujillo
- Paseo de Aguas

== See also ==
- Trujillo
- España Avenue
- Marinera Festival
- Trujillo Spring Festival
- Las Delicias beach
- Huanchaco
- Santiago de Huamán
- Victor Larco Herrera District
