= Víctor Larco Herrera District =

Víctor Larco Herrera
- District
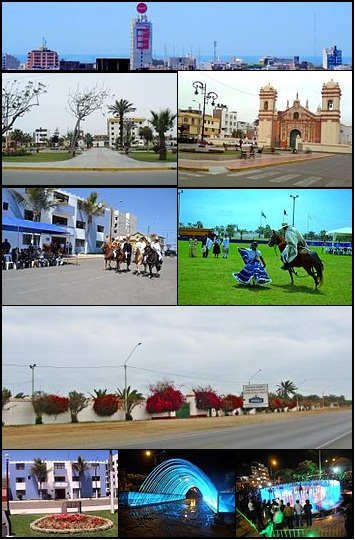
- From top and left to right: View toward Víctor Larco city, Main Square of Vista Alegre, Santiago de Huamán church, Paso Horses in a parade, Marinera dance with a Paso horse, Association of Breeders and Owners of Paso Horses in La Libertad, Municipality of Victor Larco in Buenos Aires, Pedestrian walk of waters

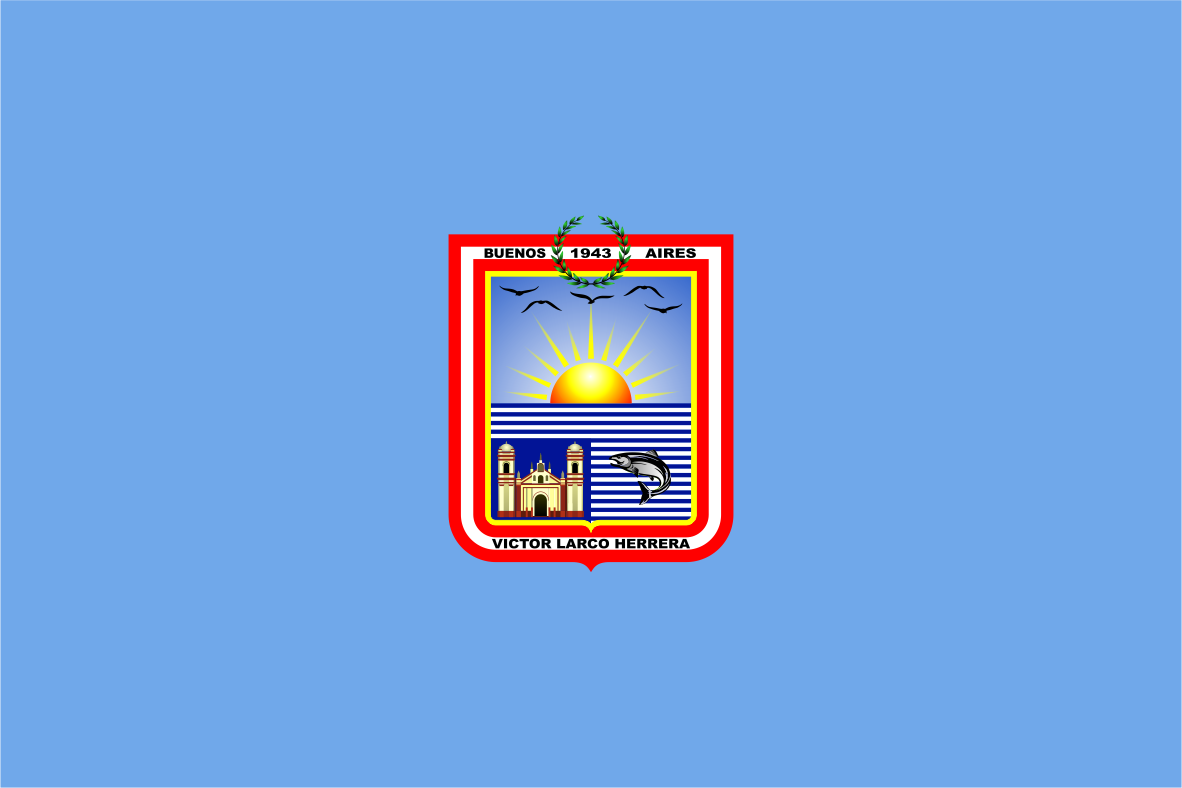
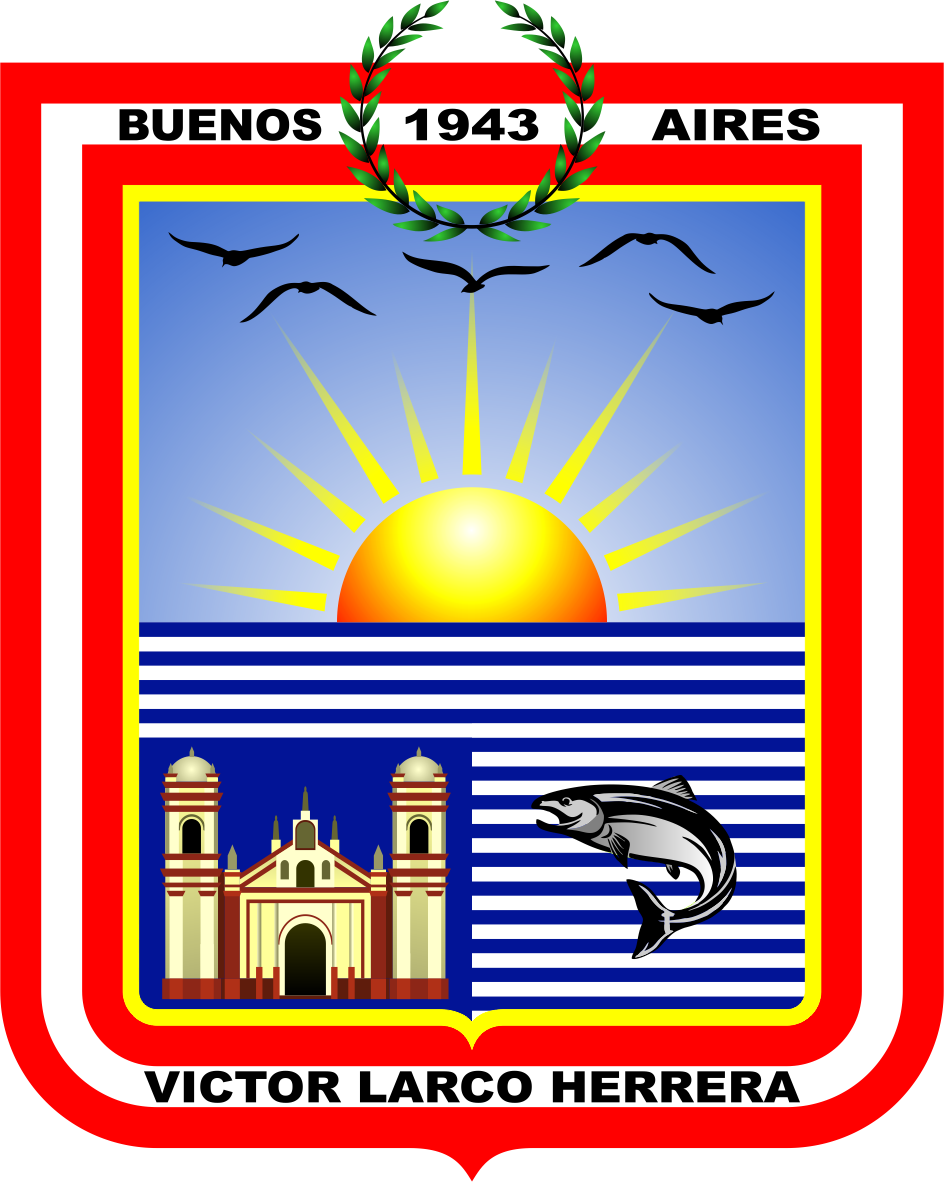
- Flag Coat of arms
- Interactive map of Víctor Larco Herrera
- Coordinates: 8°08′S 79°03′W
- Country: Peru
- Region: La Libertad
- Province: Trujillo
- Founded: January 22, 1943
- Capital: Buenos Aires

Government
  - Mayor: César Augusto Juárez Castillo

Area
  - Total: 18.02 km^{2} (6.96 sq mi)
- Elevation: 3 m (9.8 ft)

Population (2017)
  - Total: 68,506
  - Estimate (2014): 63,317
  - Density: 3,802/km^{2} (9,846/sq mi)
- Demonym: Victorlarquense
- Time zone: UTC-5 (PET)
- Postal code: 13009
- UBIGEO: 130111
- Website: www.munivictorlarco.gob.pe

Víctor Larco Herrera also called commonly Víctor Larco is a district and a city of the north coast of Peru. It is located on a plain along the Pacific Ocean and is linked by a conurbation with Trujillo in La Libertad region. It is considered one of the 9 districts of the urban area known as Trujillo Metropolitano, one of the most populous metropolitan areas of Peru; it is also one of the 11 districts of Trujillo province. Victor Larco is the district that has the highest human development index (HDI) out of Lima Metropolitana, according to a study published by the United Nations Development Programme. In the early twentieth century, for its mild climate and fresh, it was known as Buenos Aires and then in 1945 got the name of Victor Larco Herrera in memory of the philanthropist Trujillan who was a benefactor of the city.

Today Víctor Larco is a commercial and residential urban center that still retains much of green areas and shopping areas like Larco avenue, Fatima avenue, etc., Growing residential areas, educational centers at all levels that join students and teachers from around the country; also has tourist attractions like the Tunnel of desires in the Water Walk, Santiago de Huamán church dating from the colonial era, the resort of Buenos Aires, the Paso Horse Mural, among others. Towards the south of the district still retains some of its countryside in the area near the Moche River and its mouth at the Pacific Ocean.

== Identity elements ==
Víctor Larco has important traditions as marinera dance being Víctor El Chino Calderón an important exponent; training of paso horses that is performed mainly an Association of Breeders and Owners of Paso Horses.

=== Symbols ===
- Coat of arms
- Flag
- Anthem

The anthem was written by Ramiro Mendoza Sánchez (lyrics) and music by Nelson Alfonso Asmat Vega. The municipality of the city sets the hymn mainly through official civic ceremonies held in the city with the interpretation thereof by bands of musicians. The hymn expresses greetings and appreciation to the city through its history.

== Geography ==
=== Climate ===
Climate data for Victor Larco (2011-2012)
Month	Jan	Feb	Mar	Apr	May	Jun	Jul	Aug	Sep	Oct	Nov	Dec	Year
Mean daily maximum °C (°F)	27.5 (81.5)	28.0 (82.4)	27.8 (82.0)	26.3 (79.3)	23.0 (73.4)	19.8 (67.6)	19.0 (66.2)	19.0 (66.2)	19.7 (67.5)	21.5 (70.7)	23.1 (73.6)	25.3 (77.5)	23.3 (73.9)
Daily mean °C (°F)	23.0 (73.4)	23.5 (74.3)	23.2 (73.8)	21.7 (71.1)	19.3 (66.7)	16.9 (62.4)	16.3 (61.3)	16.0 (60.8)	16.6 (61.9)	17.8 (64.0)	19.3 (66.7)	20.9 (69.6)	19.5 (67.2)
Mean daily minimum °C (°F)	18.5 (65.3)	19.0 (66.2)	18.5 (65.3)	17.0 (62.6)	15.5 (59.9)	14.0 (57.2)	13.5 (56.3)	13.0 (55.4)	13.5 (56.3)	14.0 (57.2)	15.5 (59.9)	16.5 (61.7)	15.7 (60.3)
Average relative humidity (%)	89	88	89	89	89	89	89	89	90	90	89	89	89
Source 1: accuweather.com
Source 2: Weatherbase Humidity: % Average Morning Relative Humidity

== Demographics ==
According to the results of the Population and Housing Census of 2007, the total population of Víctor Larco district for that year was 55 781 inhabitants, there being an urban population of 55,738 inhabitants and a rural population of 43 inhabitants. In 2012 the estimated population is of 61,845 inhabitants distributed mostly in urban areas of the district.

Historical population

Year	Pop.	±% p.a.
1961	4,565	—
1972	14,140	+10.82%
1981	21,001	+4.49%

Year	Pop.	±% p.a.
1993	42,169	+5.98%
2007	55,781	+2.02%
2014	63,317	+1.83%

Source: INEI

=== Religion ===
Currently in Victor Larco city the predominant religion is Christianity, as a religious custom of Spanish culture inherited from the colonial era. In this topic in the district there are different congregations who profess the Christian faith such as the Catholic Church, Jehovah's Witnesses, the Church of Jesus Christ of Latter-day Saints and also called Mormons, Pentecostal church, etc.. All these Christian congregations have their temples in different parts of the district and there are several churches of these congregations as the temple of the Church of the Latter-day Saints located on Avenida Larco, Catholic churches such as the Church of Huamán dating from colonial times and is located in the main square of the traditional village of Santiago de Huaman, etc. One of the most representative traditions of Christianity in Victor Larco and organized every year is the celebration of the patronal feast of the Lord of Huamán bringing together large numbers of Christians in the historic sanctuary of the traditional village of Huaman.

== Transportation ==
=== Principal streets ===
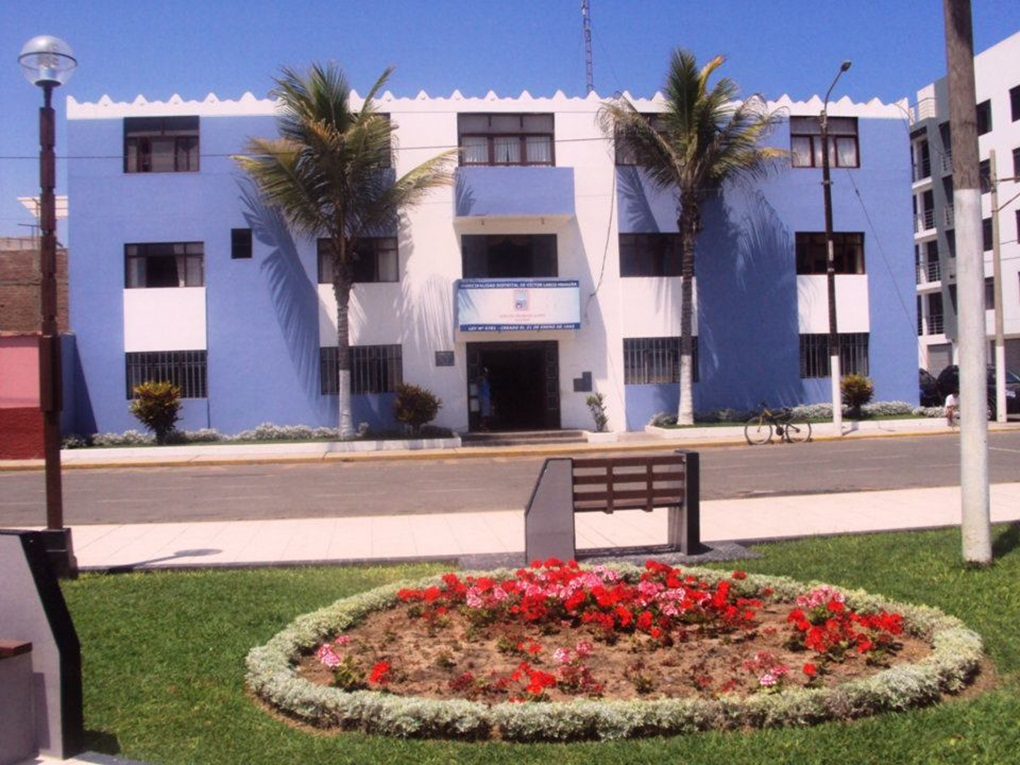
Victor Larco Municipality

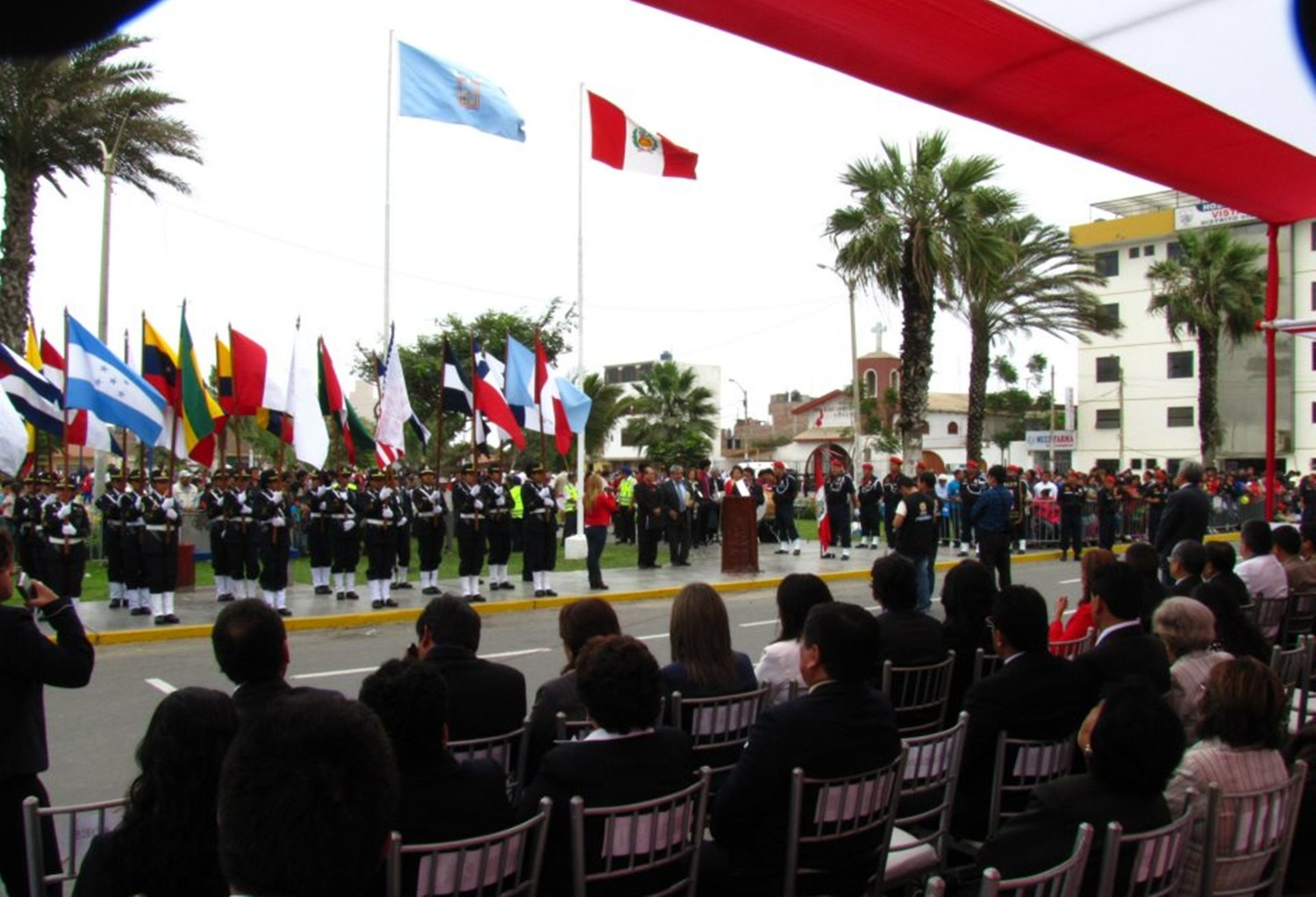
Civic celebration ceremony in the main square of Vista Alegre

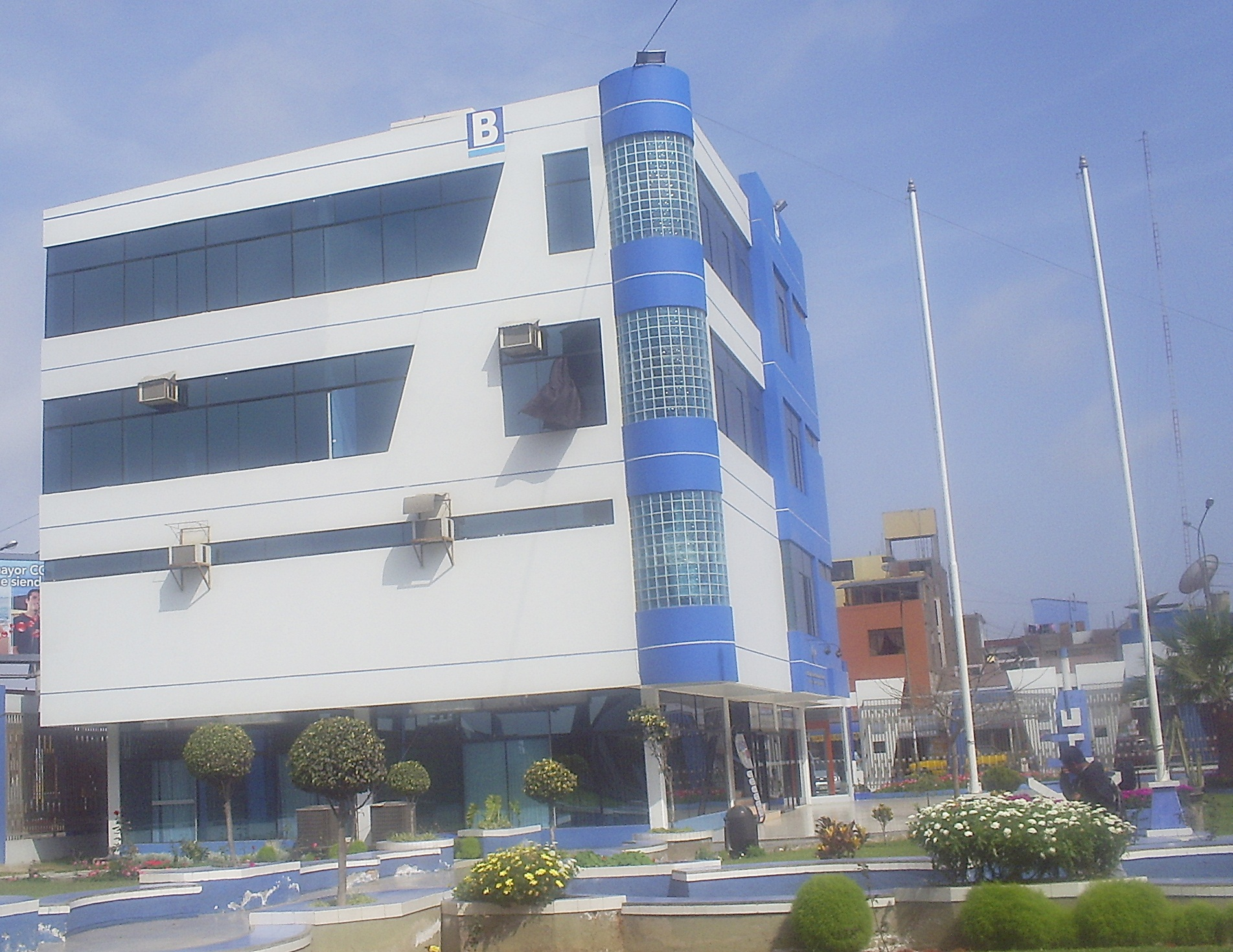
Admission office of the UCV in block 17th of Larco avenue in Victor Larco Herrera District

Some of the most important streets in Víctor Larco district are:

- Larco Avenue

This avenue takes its name of the famous trujillan politician Victor Larco Herrera; in this avenue are located many companies such as Cesar Vallejo University, RENIEC (Office for National Identity Register), etc.

- Manuel Seoane avenue this avenue goes to Buenos Aires beach.
- Fátima avenue in the limits with Trujillo district at north begins in Larco avenue.
- El Golf avenue
- Dos de mayo avenue
- César Vallejo avenue
- Prolongación Juam Pablo II avenue
- Avenida Huamán, takes its name of the traditional and historic town of Huamán.
- Los Paujiles avenue .

== Education ==
Among the centers of higher education are the following:

- Cesar Vallejo University.
- TECSUP, is a technological institute.

=== Primary and secondary schools ===
Some of the primary and secondary schools are:

- La Inmaculada, located in Los Ángeles avenue N° 328 in the locality of California.
- Santa Edelmira, primary and secondary school located in Las Orquídeas street number 371 in the locality of the same name in the intersection with Huamán avenue.
- Víctor Larco, in Hipólito Unanue street number 300, in the locality of Vista Alegre.
- Augusto Alva Ascurra located in Huaman avenue.
- José Antonio Encinas located in Bolivia avenue number 489 in the locality of Buenos Aires.
- Alfred Nobel, this school is in front the Pedestrian walk of waters in Larco avenue N° 1901, in the locality of Santa Edelmira.
- Cristiano Elliot, in Larco avenue N° 968 locality of San Andrés.
- Integridad, in a corner formed by Rubén Darío and John Kennedy streets in the locality of Vista Alegre.
- Jesús de Nazareth in Larco avenue N° 891 locality of San Andrés V.
- Los Sauces, located in the sector called Los Sauces.
- Max Ludwing Planck, located in Las Moreras street number 460-468, locality of California.
- Nuestra Señora de Fátima, in Los Tilos street N° 149, locality of California.
- San José Obrero, located in Los Claveles street N° 112, locality of California.
- San Silvestre, in Ayacucho street N° 441, locality of Vista Alegre.
- Tercer Milenio, in Huaman avenue N° 186, locality of Vista Alegre.
- Víctor Raúl Haya de la Torre, located in Miguel Grau street N° 613, locality of Buenos Aires Norte.
- Andrés Avelino Cáceres in Simón Bolívar street N° 300, locality of Vista Alegre.
- Interamericano, in Los Laureles street N° 279, locality of California.

== Government ==
=== Local government ===
The city is governed by the Municipality of Victor Larco, which is governed by the provisions of the organic law of municipalities, it has jurisdiction throughout the district and the city, in that sense, the municipality of the district have jurisdiction in matters relating to their own district.

=== Political system ===
The city is governed by a distrital mayor elected by popular vote every four years. The mayor is responsible for the municipal public administration and community, He is the political representative of the municipality of the city and has political directives at the distrital level, so the guidelines of their policies are aimed primarily at the territorial level.

== Economy ==
Victor Larco district according to study published by INEI in the year 2009, there were 146 companies in the manufacturing sector which accounted for 2.9 percent in that year of the total of the province of Trujillo.

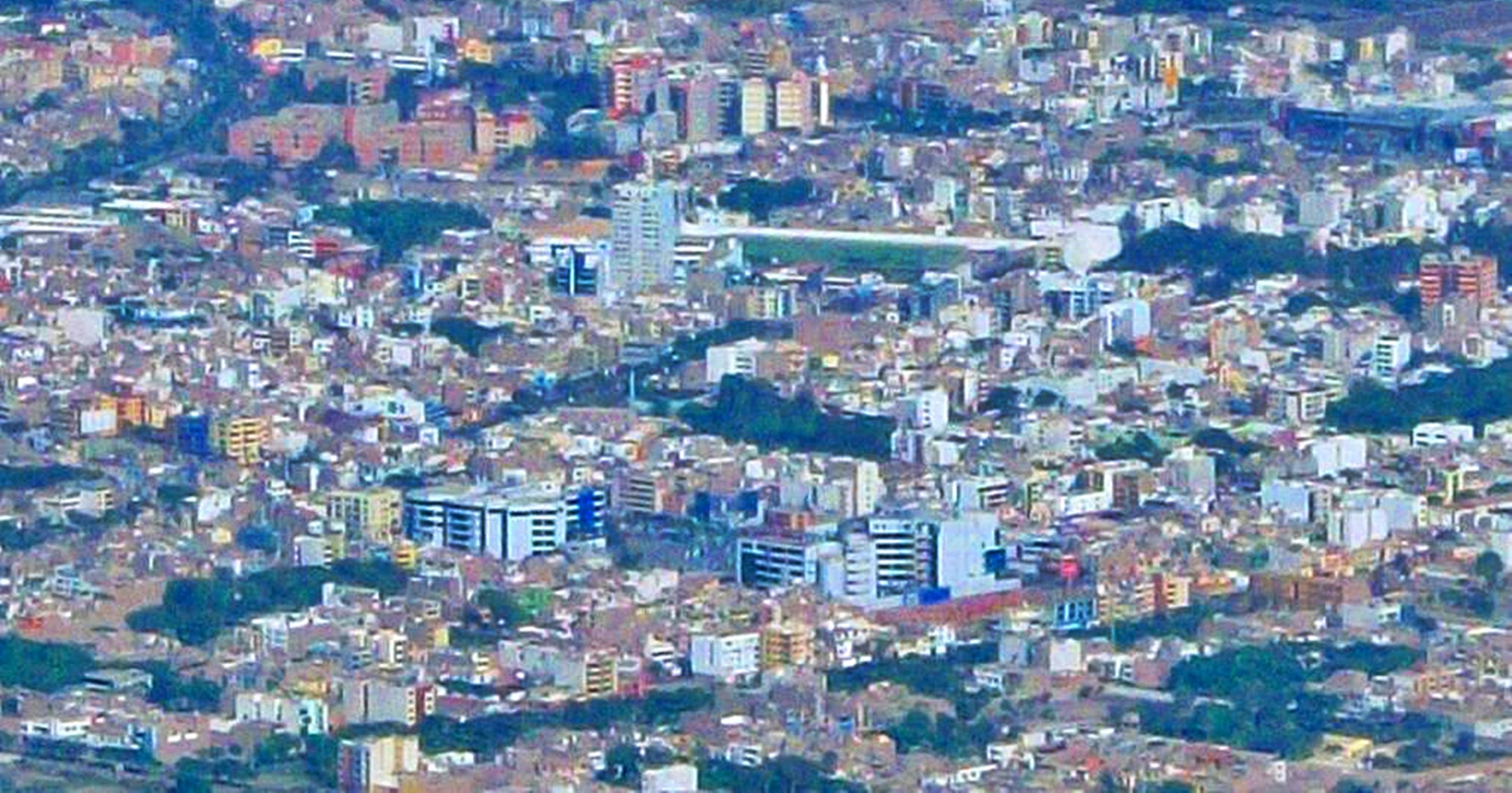
View from the air of Víctor Larco district joining with Trujillo

=== Principal brands ===
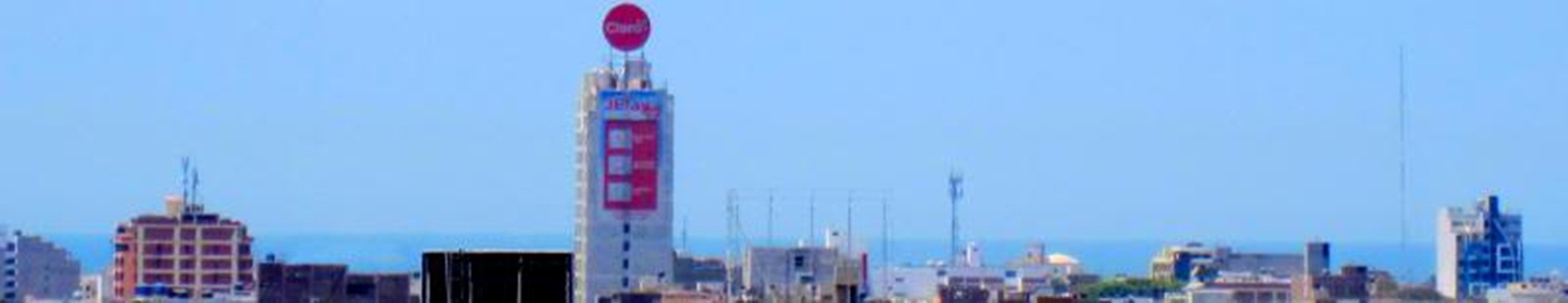
Panoramic view toward Víctor Larco Herrera district

1. UCV, it is the principal mark of the largest consortium of universities constituted by the Cesar Vallejo University, "Lord of Sipan University" and "Autónoma University of Peru," the first of which has its headquarters in the Victor Larco Herrera District in Trujillo city. It was founded by engineer César Acuña Peralta in 1991. Today this brand has six branches in the country and is projected to internationalization in Miami city. This brand also has several teams of volleyball and soccer, the main one is Club Deportivo Universidad César Vallejo, who in 2012 participates in the tournament of Peruvian first division.

2. UCV Satelital, is a television channel that Broadcasts its signal from Victor Larco district and some of its programs are seen in other cities through their respective subsidiaries. This TV station is located in block 17 of Avenida Larco in front of Cesar Vallejo University

== Tourism ==
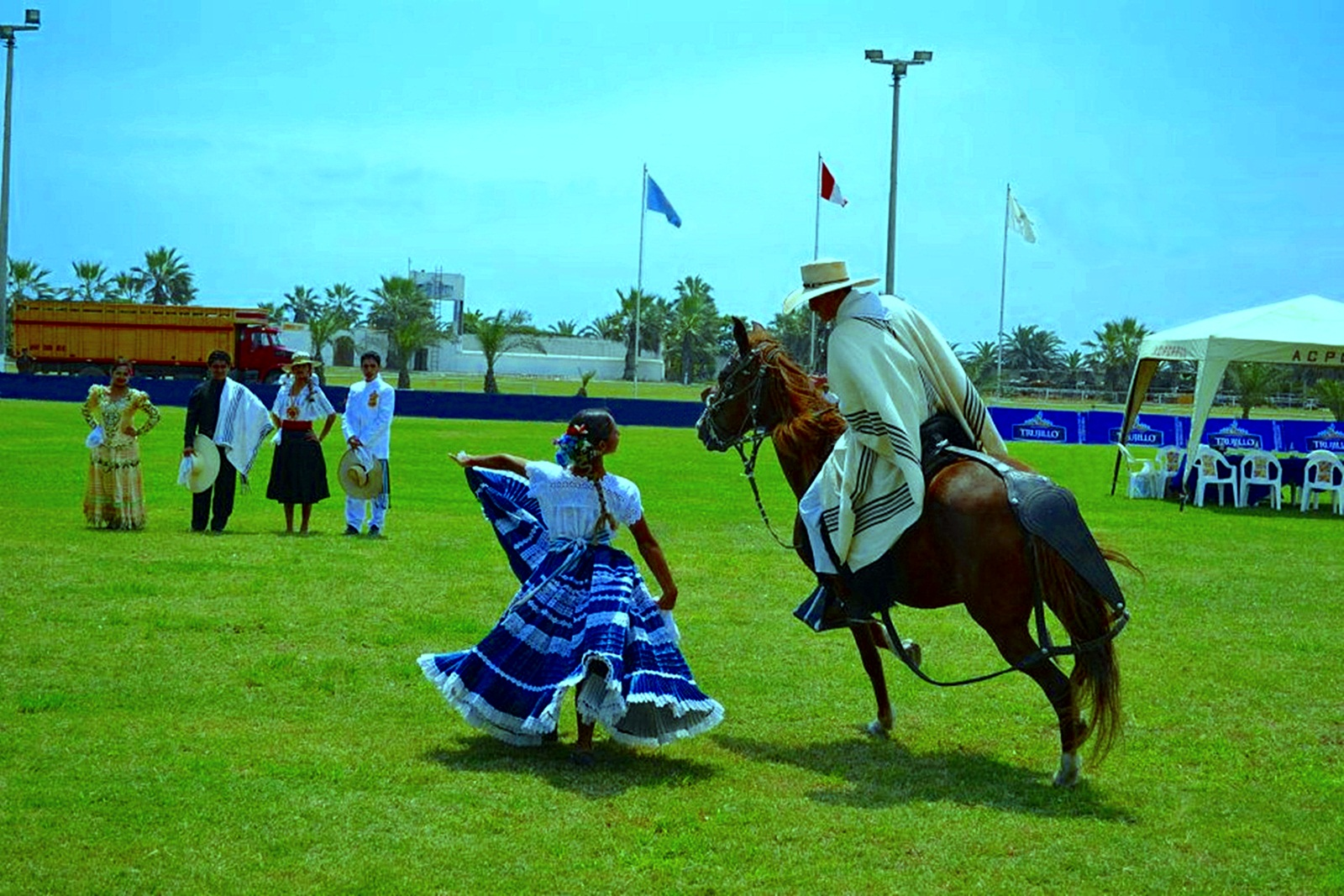
Peruvian Paso contest

Some attractions are:

- Santiago de Huamán Church, is located in Main Square of the town.
- Huaman Main Square, in this place it is celebrated the festival of Patron Lord of Huaman, and also beauty contests.
- Buenos Aires beach
- Larco avenue
- Paseo de Aguas
- Association of Breeders and Owners of Paso Horses in La Libertad
- Victor Larco Main Square
- Vista Alegre Main Square
- Peruvian paso Wall
- California park
Tourism in Víctor Larco

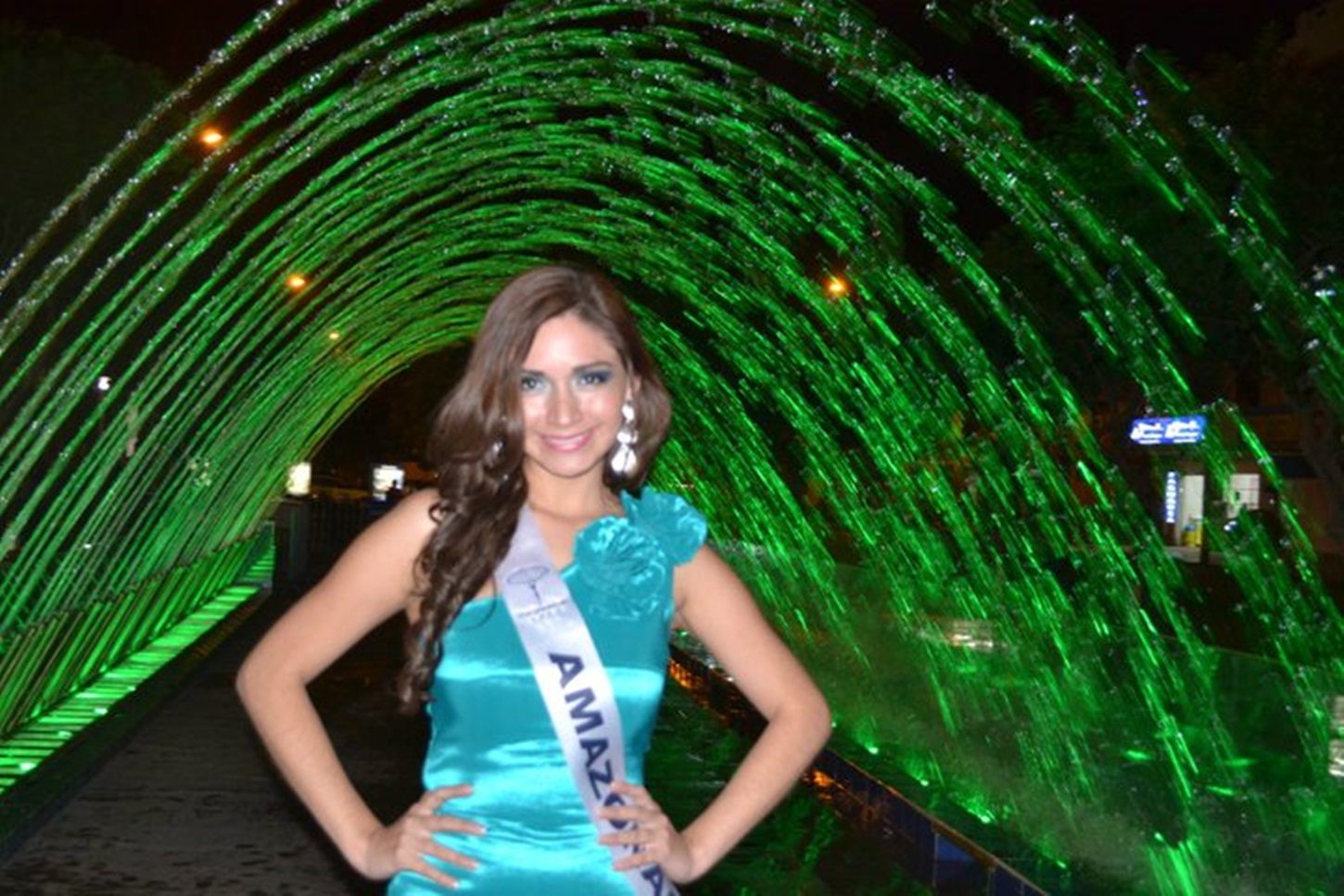
Park called Paseo de Aguas

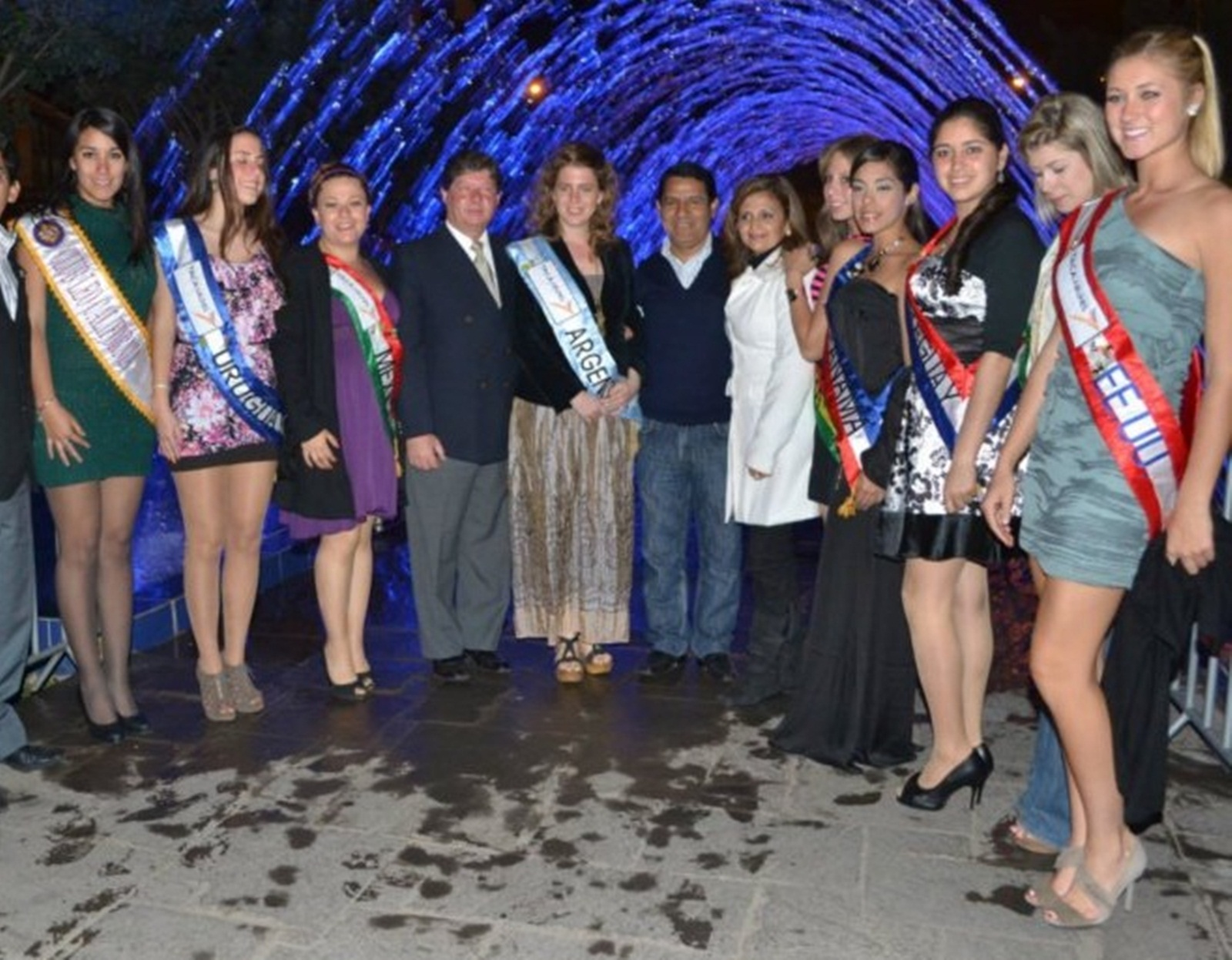
Queens of Trujillo Spring Festival in visiting the Paseo de Aguas

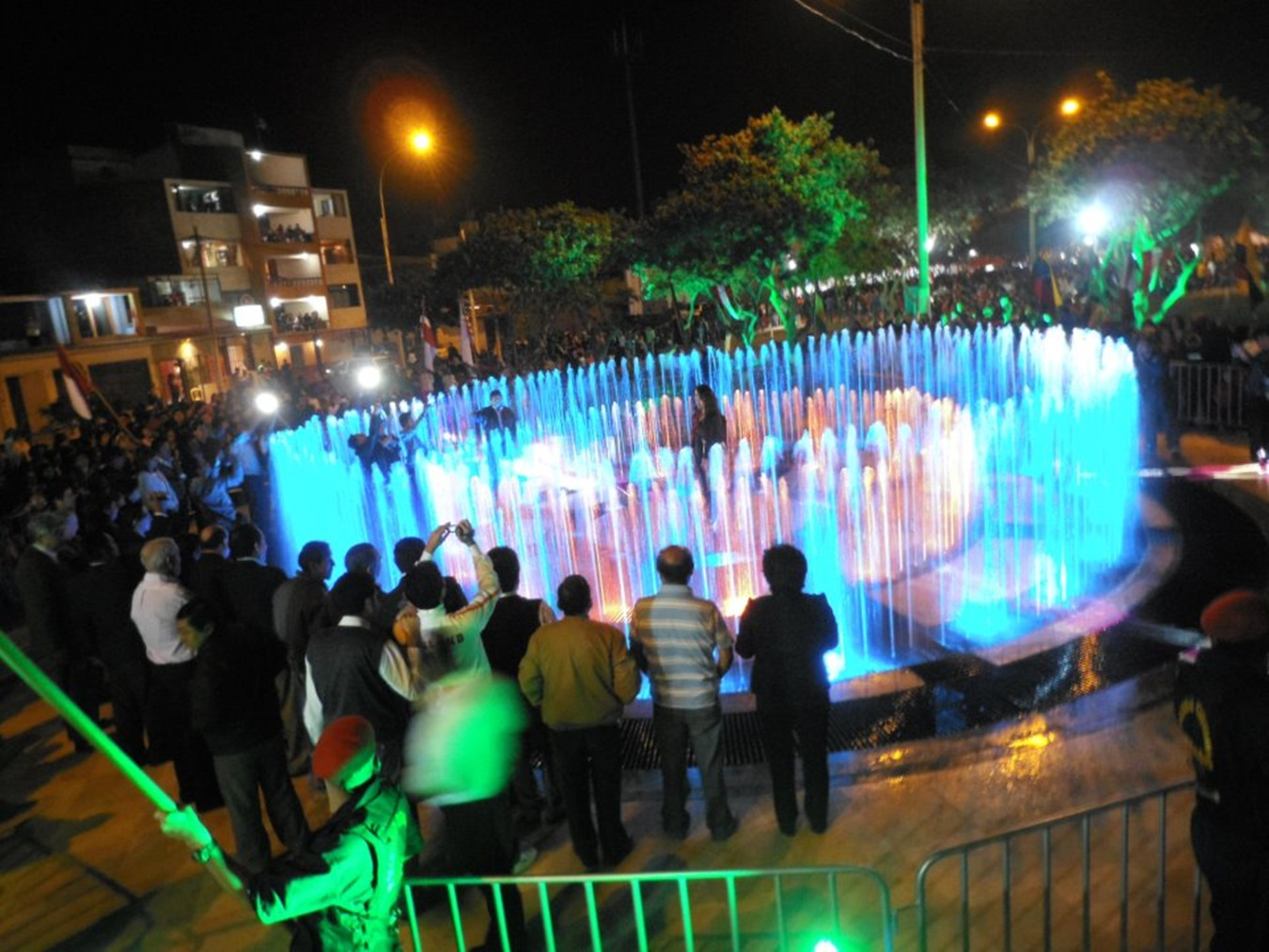
Pool fun in the Paseo de Aguas

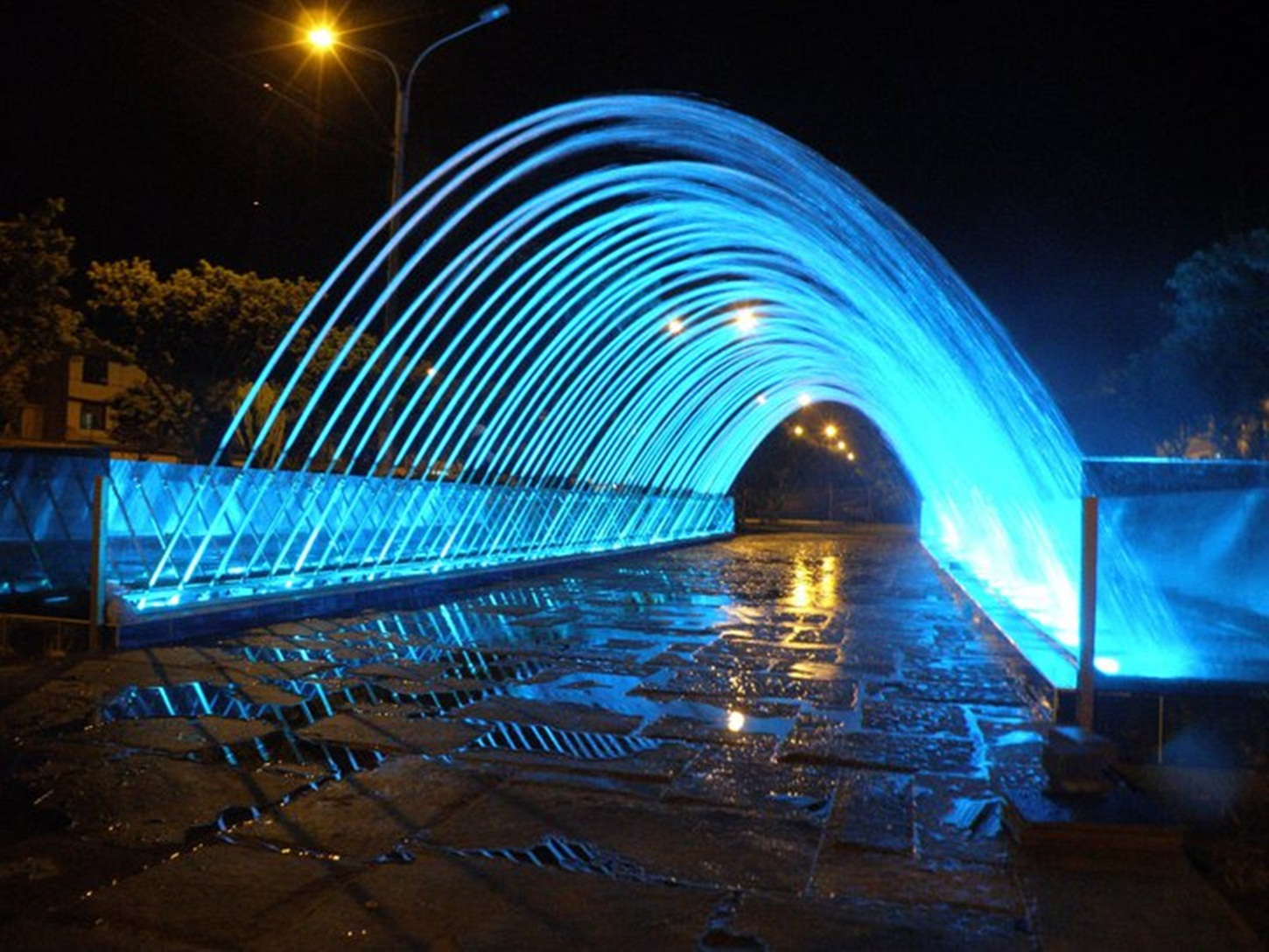
Tunnel of desires in the El Paseo de Aguas

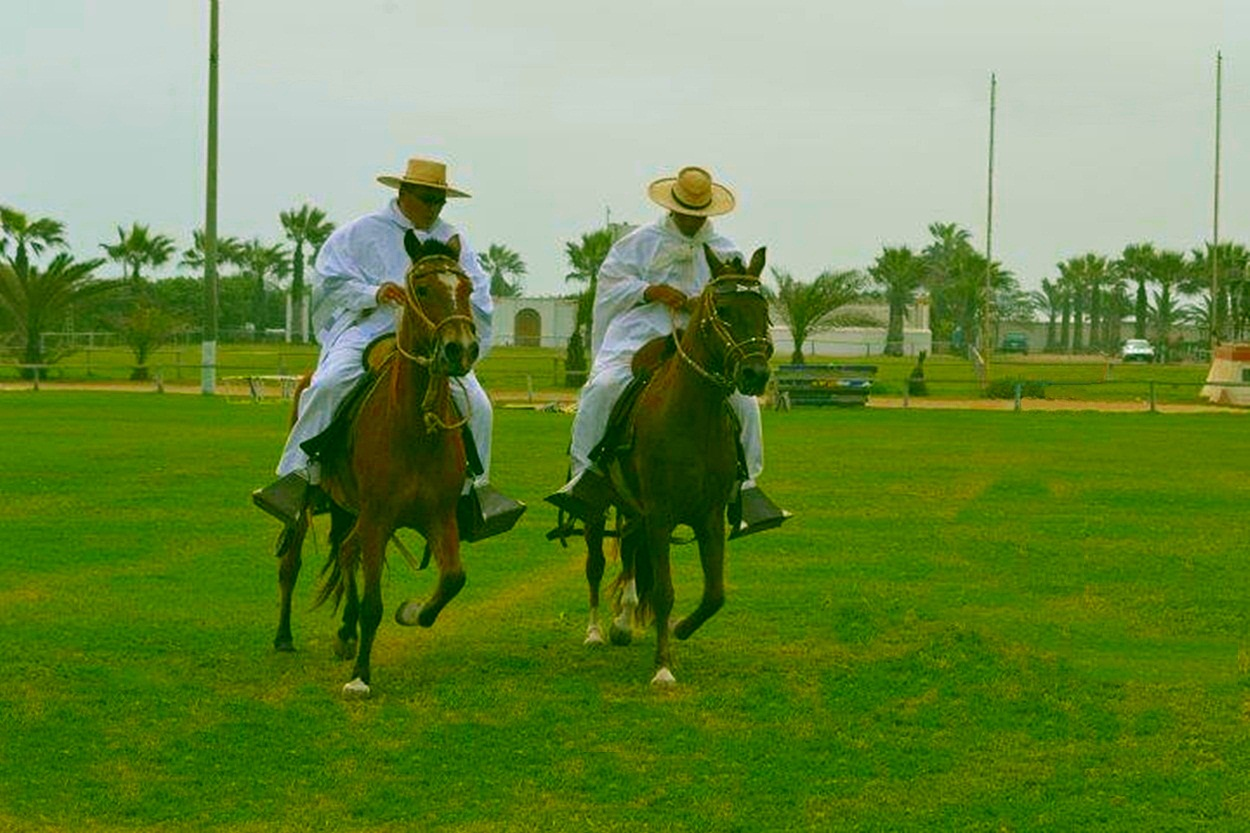
Chalanes Trujillanos in horses

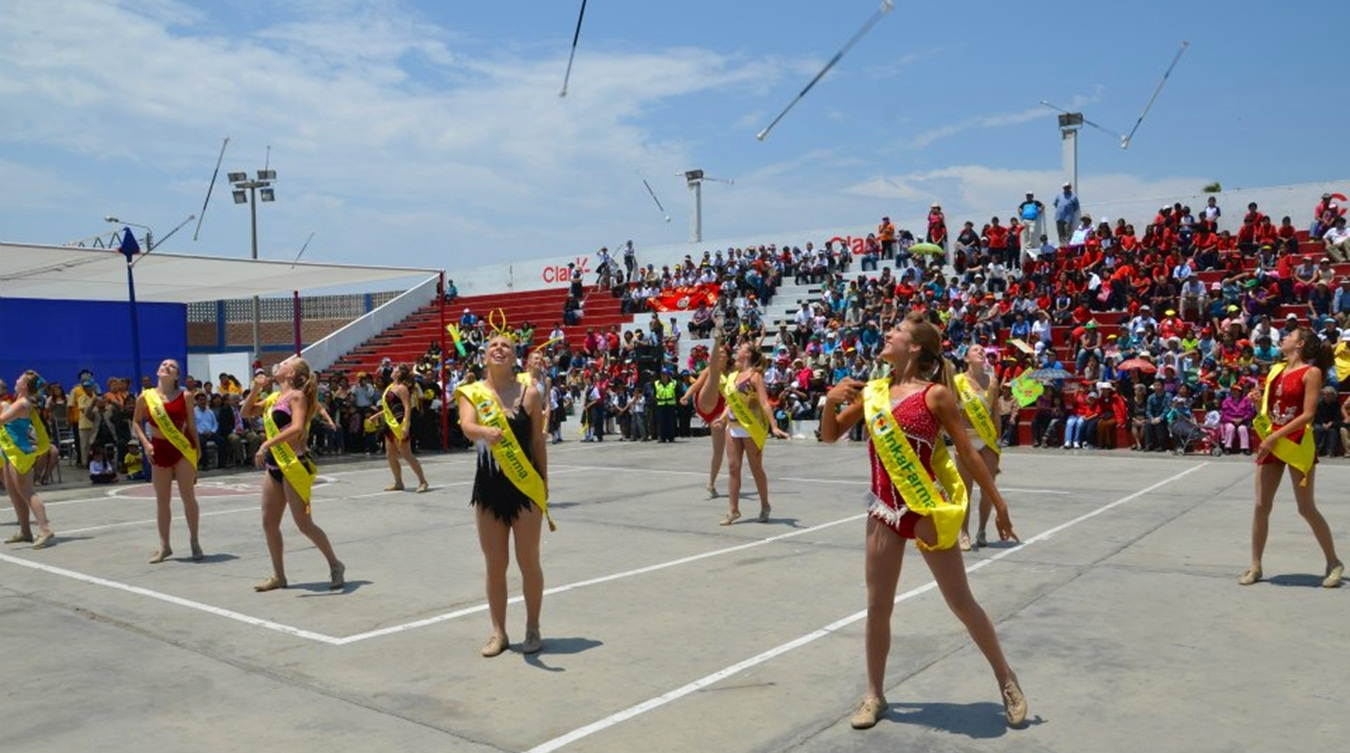
Guaripolas in a show

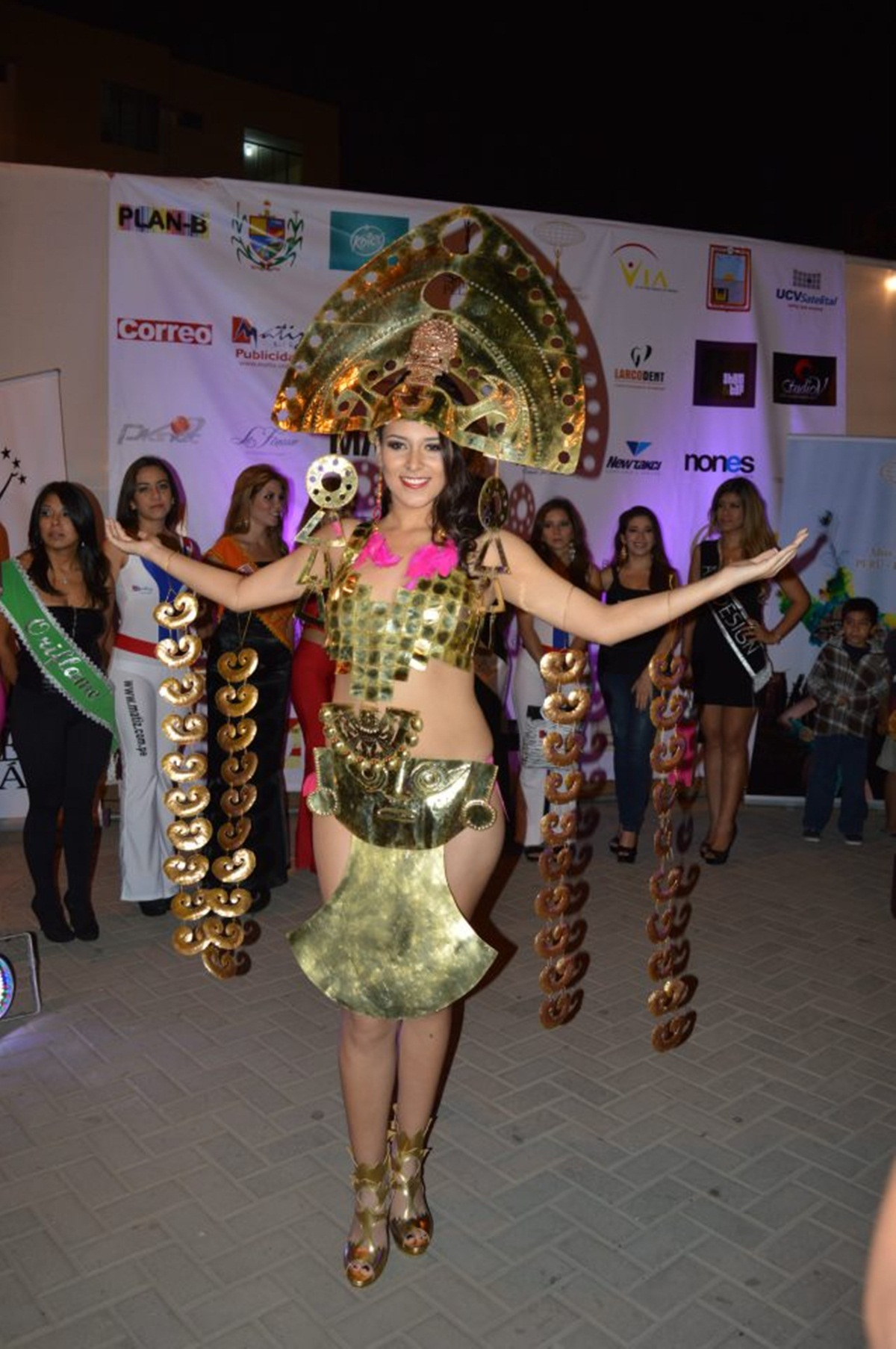
Contest Miss Internacional in Santiago De Huamán

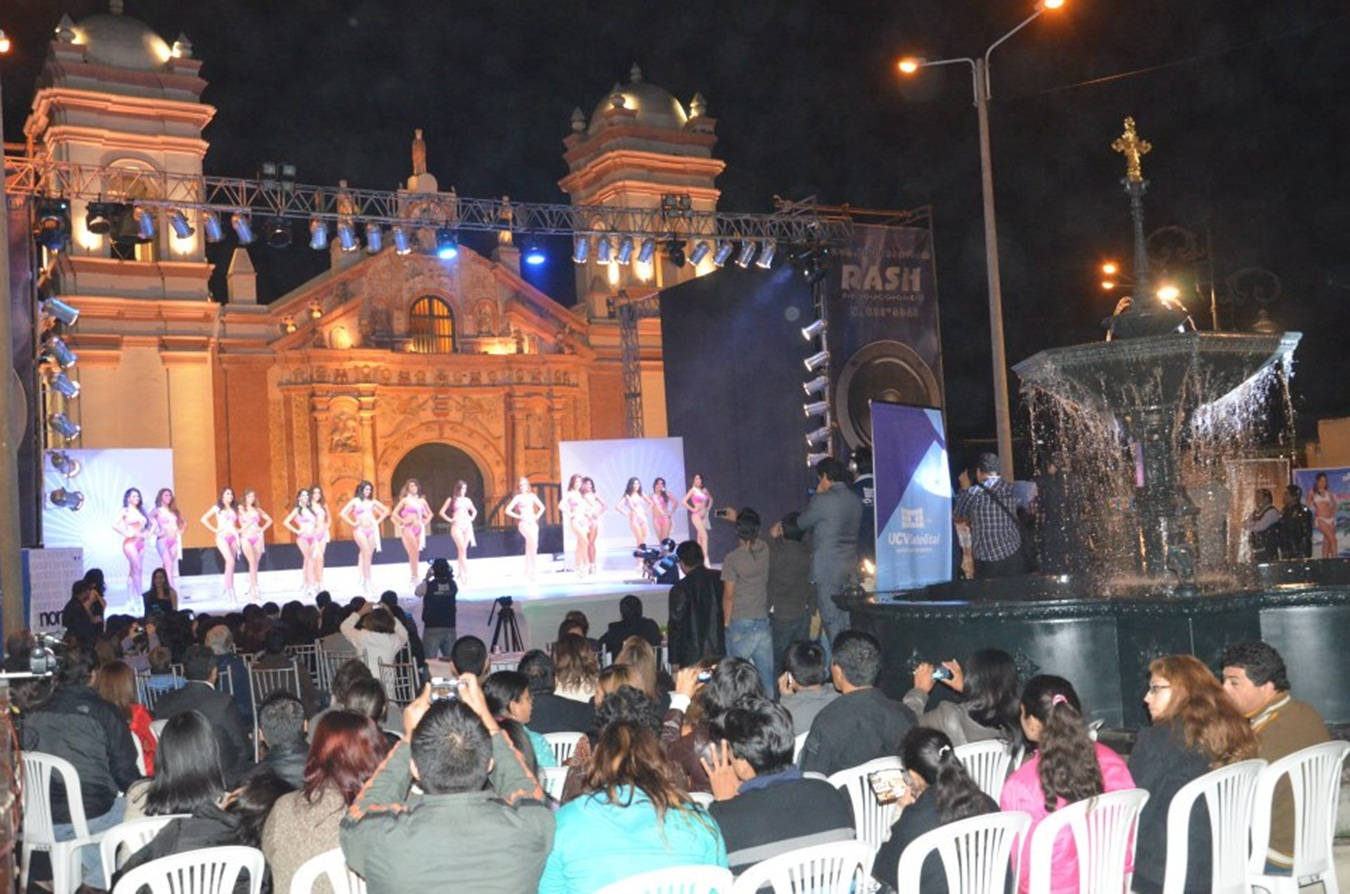
Contest Miss Internacional

== Festivals and events ==
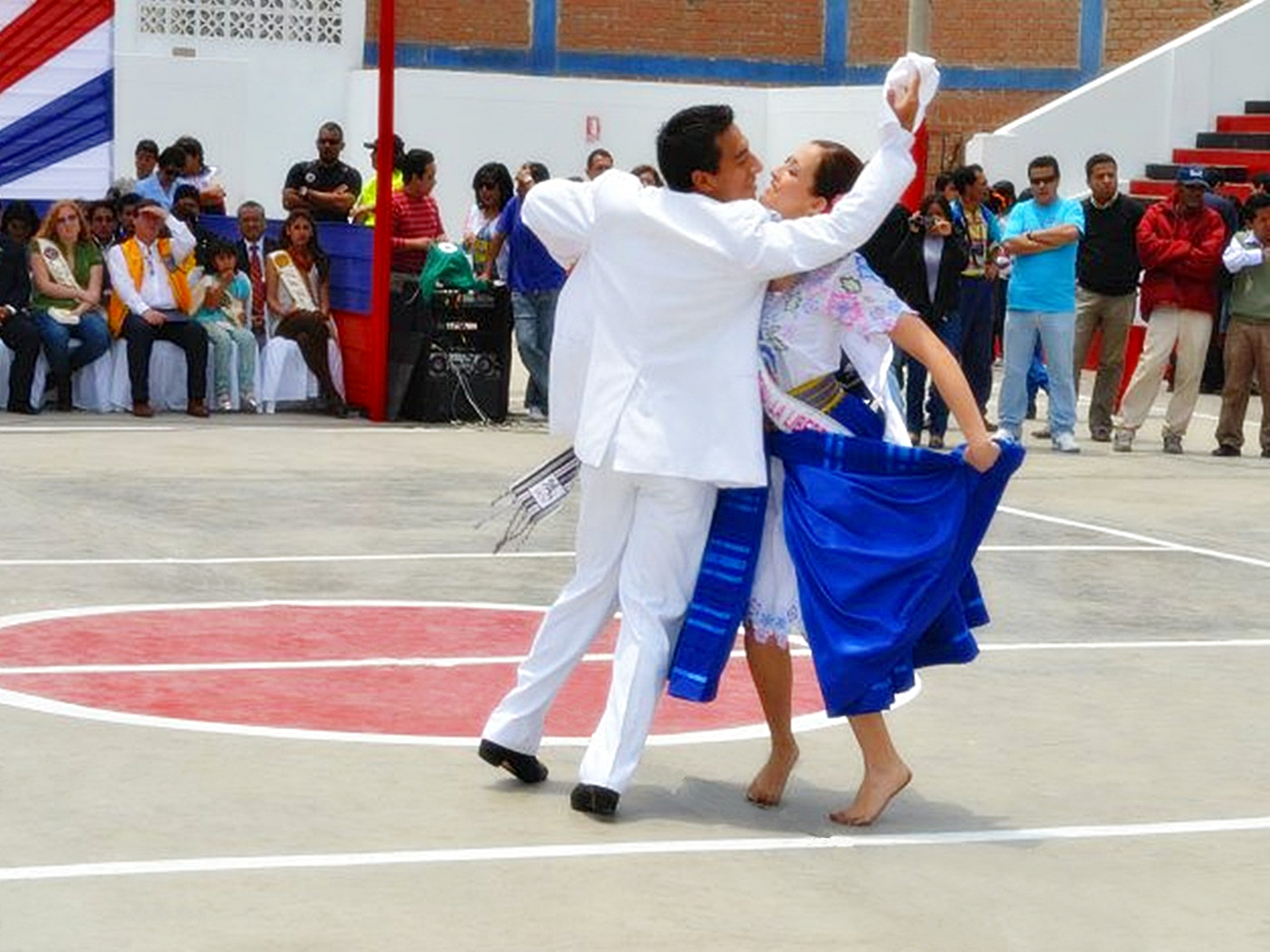
Marinera dance in Víctor Larco

- Patron Lord of Huaman

The origin of this tradition dates back more than 300 years. It is a religious festival that attracts the interest of pilgrims and tourists who visit the historic temple of Santiago de Huaman. The celebration of the festival takes place from 13 to 27 May in honor of the Lord of Huaman; are made novenas, rosary and confessions offered by his faithful devotees. The celebrations also include morning and afternoon sports. Ie the main day are performed special celebrations, flag hoisting, solemn festive mass which is chaired by the Archbishop of Trujillo, also a procession of the sacred image and input to his parish with typical band of musicians. According to tradition, a fishermen went to the beach totorales old known as Playa Vieja and now as "La Bocana" and found three chests that drew heavily to shore. In one of the chests were discovered clothes, in the second and third holy image of the Lord in parts. They moved around the town where armed and wore the sacred image. One of the seamen waking Huaman said Lord, save us! and named him. The Bishop of Trujillo when knew the finding ordered to build a chapel at the site of the discovery but appeared destroyed. He was returned to redo beyond and also was destroyed, then the native fishermen decided to build the church in the village of Huaman.

- Patron Lord of the Sea is celebrated in June days after Lord of Huaman Festival.
- Víctor Larco anniversary, in January.
- Saint Judas Tadeo feast in October 7.
- Santa Rosa, from 19 to 30 month of August in Buenos Aires.
- Lord of miracles, October 18, in Vista Alegre.
- Festival of sweets and flavors month of July in Paseo de Aguas.

== Towns ==
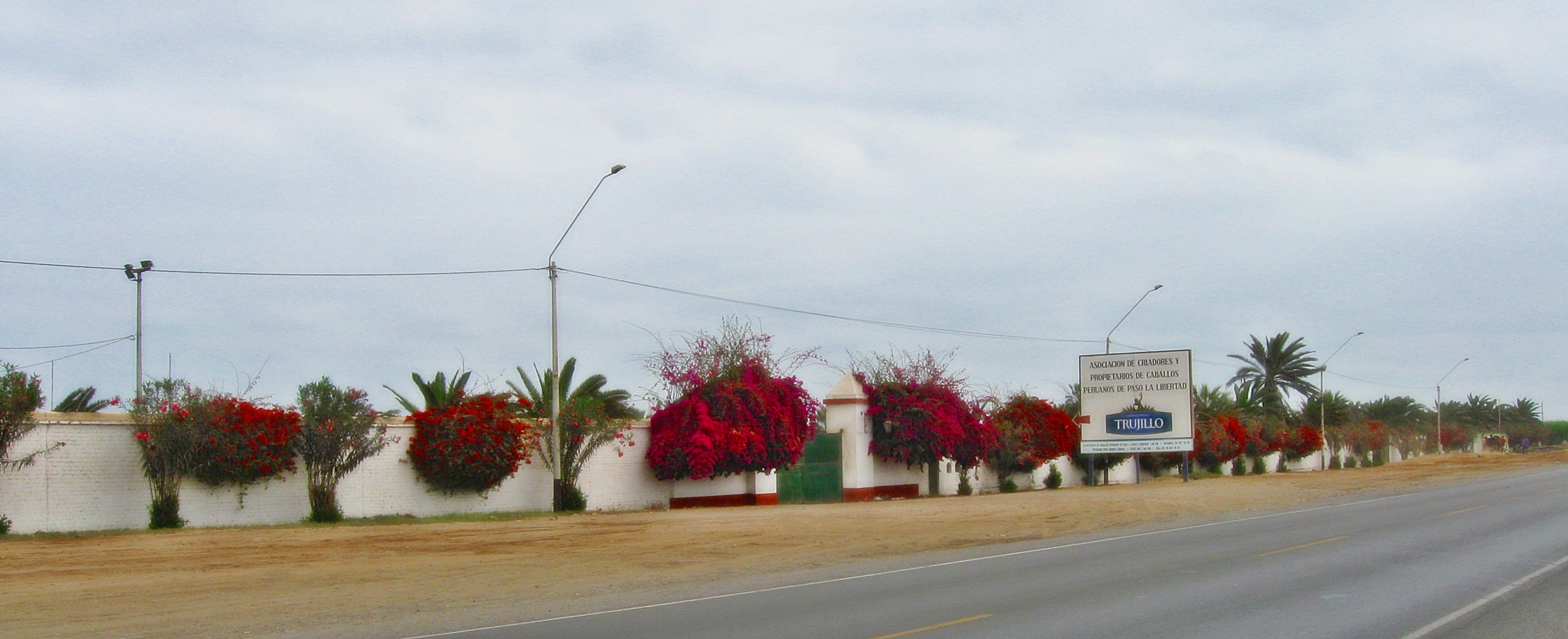
Association of Breeders and Owners of Paso Horses in La Libertad located in Buenos Aires North in west of Trujillo city

In Victor Larco Herrera district there are the following towns:

- California
- Las Hortencias de California
- San José de California
- Santa Edelmira
- Fátima
- Vista Alegre
- San Pedro
- San Andres V Etapa
- El Golf
- Huamán
- Las Palmeras del Golf
- Las Flores del Golf
- Los Jardines del Golf
- Las Palmas
- Buenos Aires
- Los Sauces
- Las Flores
- Liberación Social
- Magisterial El Golf
- La Encalada
- Villa Florencia
- La Bocana, known in old times as Playa Vieja near where Moche river comes into the Pacific Ocean, this place is the origin of the traditional Lord of Huaman.

== Security of citizenship ==
As in other areas of Trujillo city, the safety of the people of Victor Larco is the responsibility of the National Police, which operates mainly in the district from the police station in Buenos Aires. They are joined by the work of the staff of public safety called serenazgo which is a municipal public security surveillance of the City of Victor Larco and also are important the offices of the judiciary installed in the district.

Video surveillance cameras have also been installed in strategic locations in the district to record events that occur in these cameras' coverage angles.

== Health ==
The main health centers for people of the city are:

- Health Center Victor Larco, located in the 4th block of Tacna street in the sector Buenos Aires.
- Hospital Vista Alegre, located in the main square of Vista Alegre.
- ESSALUD Polyclinic, located on Larco avenue, caters to persons covered by health insurance system ESSALUD.

== Notable natives and residents ==
- Víctor Felipe Calderón Valeriano also known as Victor "El Chino Calderón", is a master of marinera dance in Victor Larco and Trujillo city
- Róger David Torres Mendoza, head of the Direction Territorial of Police of La Libertad (DIRTEPOL

== See also ==
- Trujillo
- Historic Centre of Trujillo
- Chan Chan
- Puerto Chicama
- Chimu
- Pacasmayo beach
- Marcahuamachuco
- Wiracochapampa
- Chimu
- Moche
- San Jose Festival
- Vista Alegre
- Buenos Aires
- Huanchaco
- Las Delicias beach
- La Libertad Region
- Trujillo Province, Peru
- Virú culture
- Independence of Trujillo
- Santiago de Huamán
- Lake Conache
- Marinera Festival
- Trujillo Spring Festival
- Wetlands of Huanchaco
- Salaverry
- Puerto Morín
- Moche, Trujillo
- Wall of Trujillo
- Plaza de Armas of Trujillo
