= Avenida César Vallejo (Trujillo) =

Avenue in Trujillo, Peru

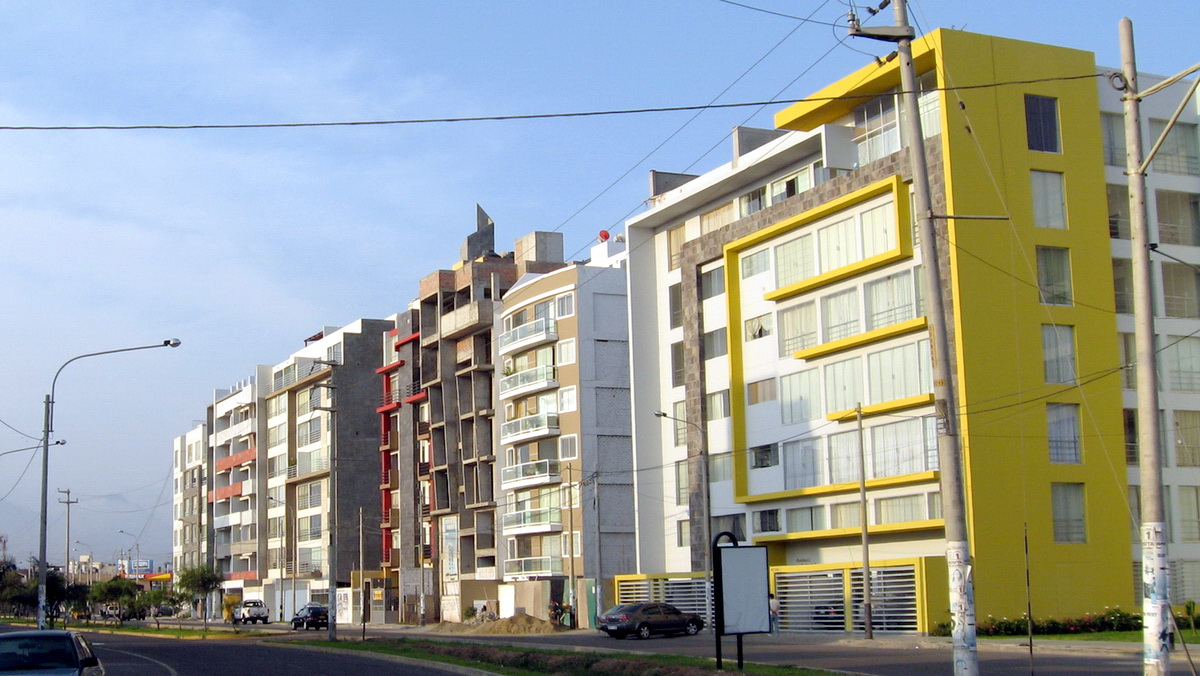
- Location: Trujillo
- From: Av. José María Eguren
- To: Av. Pesqueda

César Vallejo Avenue (Spanish: Avenida César Vallejo) is one of the main avenues in Trujillo, Peru. It extends from southwest to northeast in the districts of Trujillo and El Porvenir along 25 blocks.

It is named after Peruvian poet César Vallejo, who lived in the city from 1913 to 1918.

Due to the COVID-19 pandemic in Peru, construction work in the road was paralyzed in 2020 for 134 days, after which it was resumed.
