= César Vallejo University =

Private university in Trujillo, Peru

- Universidad César Vallejo
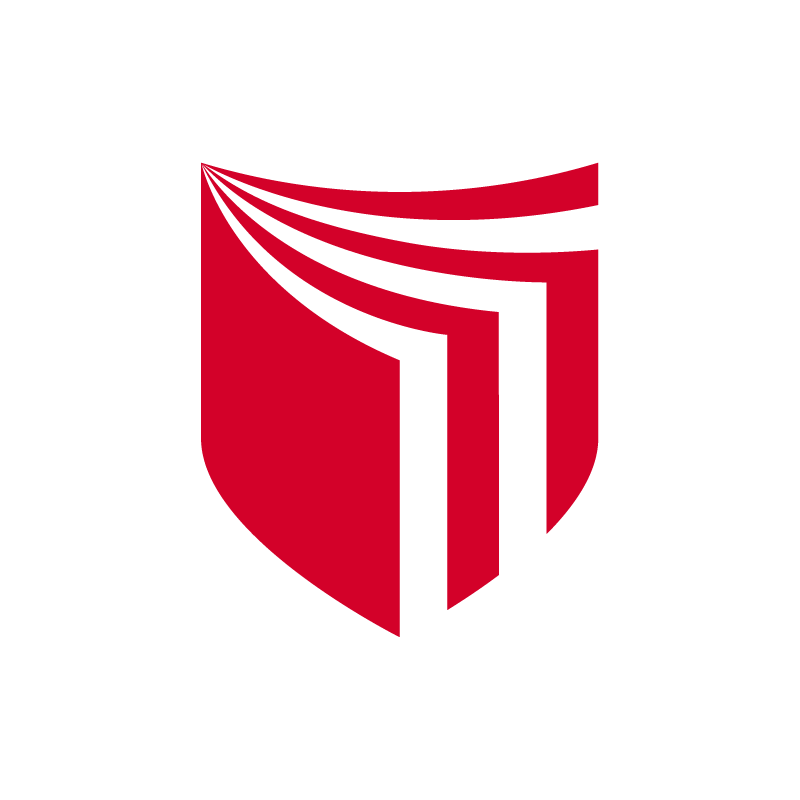
- Motto: Somos la universidad de los que quieren salir adelante.
- Motto in English: We are the university of those who want to get ahead.
- Type: Private
- Established: November 12, 1991
- Founders: César Acuña Peralta
- Affiliations: URSULA Consortium USS-UCV-UA
- President: Beatriz Merino Lucero
- Rector: Dr. Humberto Llempén Coronel
- Academic staff: 4,541 (2018)
- Administrative staff: 8,173 (2018)
- Students: 105,229 (2018)
- Undergraduates: 85,084
- Postgraduates: 10,202
- Doctoral students: 2,273
- Other students: 9,943 (Formation for Adults, PCAM y Second Specialty)
- Location: Av. Larco 1770, Víctor Larco Herrera, Trujillo, Peru; 8°7′46″S 79°2′37″W
- Campus: Víctor Larco Herrera Chiclayo Piura Lima Tarapoto Chimbote
- Colors: Midnight Blue Red White
- Website: www.ucv.edu.pe
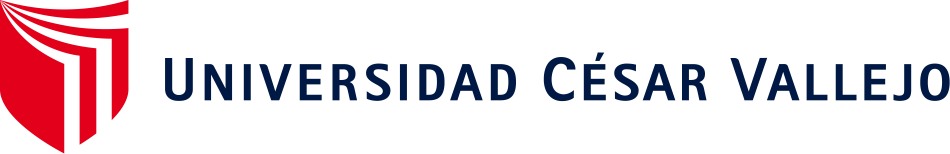

The César Vallejo University (Spanish: Universidad César Vallejo, UCV) is a private Peruvian university located in Victor Larco district in Trujillo city, on the coast of La Libertad Region.

The university was named after the Peruvian poet César Vallejo. It was founded on November 12, 1991 by César Acuña Peralta. Its headquarters are located in Victor Larco district in Trujillo city and has subsidiaries in Chiclayo, Piura, Chimbote, Tarapoto, and Lima.

== Faculties ==
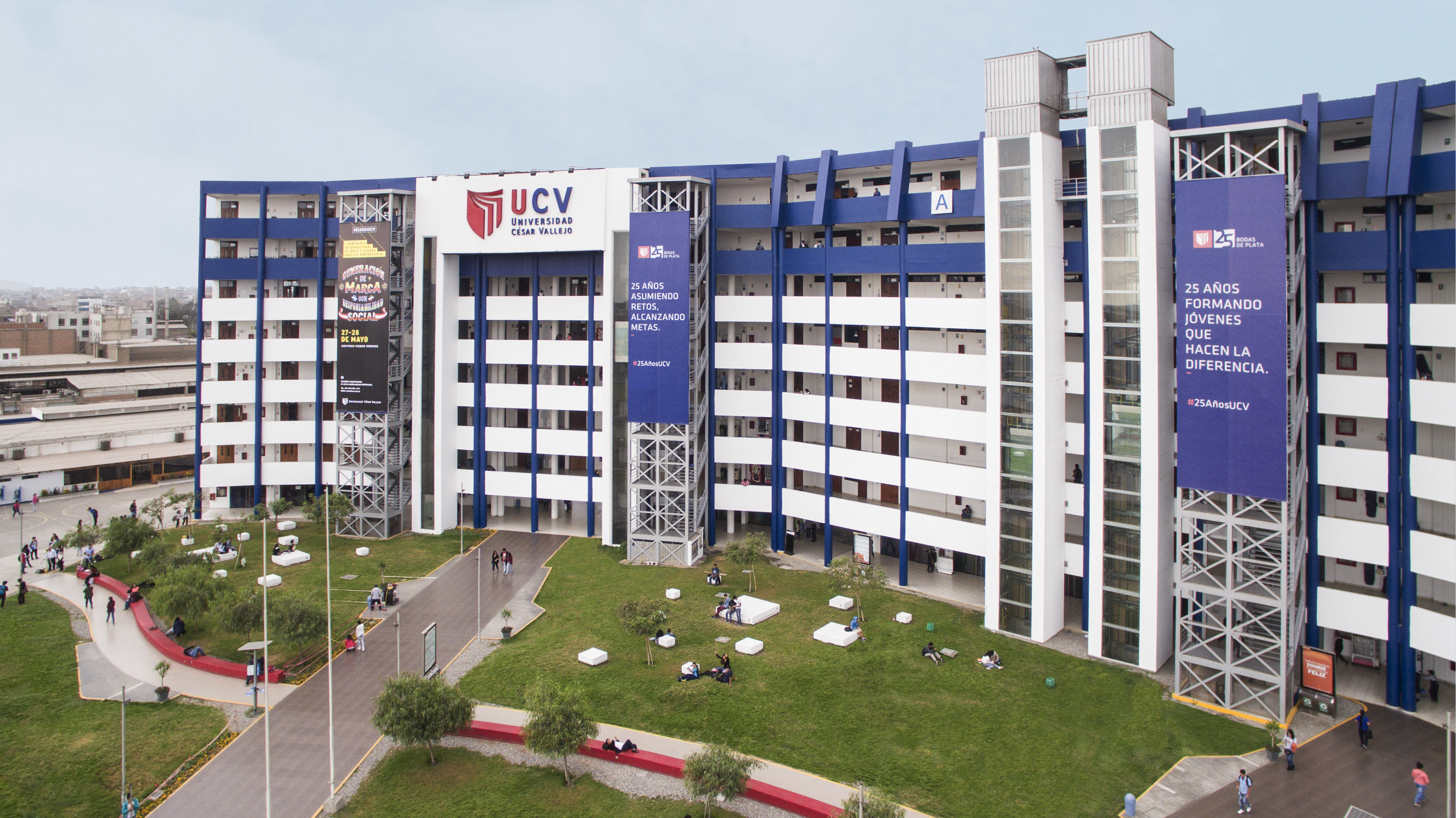
View of the university in Lima

=== Faculty of Engineering ===
- Industrial Engineering
- Agro Industrial Engineering
- Civil Engineering
- Systems Engineering

=== Faculty of Health Sciences ===
- Human Medicine
- Psychology
- Nutrition
- Stomatology
- Medical Technology
- Nursing

=== Faculty of Communication Studies ===
- Communication Studies

=== Faculty of Health Science ===
- Obstetrics

=== Faculty of Education and Humanities ===
- Early childhood education
- Primary education
- Translation and interpreting

=== Faculty of Economic Sciences ===
- Administration
- Accountancy

=== Faculty of Law and Politic Sciences ===
- Law

=== Faculty of Architecture ===
- Architecture

== See also ==
- Club Deportivo Universidad César Vallejo
- CV Universidad César Vallejo
- Victor Larco Herrera District
- List of universities in Peru
- Trujillo
