= List of shopping malls in Peru =

This is a list of shopping malls in Peru.

== Ancash ==
- Chimbote
  - Megaplaza Chimbote
- Huaraz
  - Megaplaza Huaraz (3T 2014)

== Arequipa ==
- Mall Aventura Plaza Arequipa
- Open Plaza Arequipa
- Parque Lambramani
- Real Plaza Arequipa
- Arequipa Center
- Arequipa Plaza Norte
- La Marina Shopping Center (2014)

== Ayacucho ==
- Huamanga
  - Megaplaza Ayacucho (2014)

== Cajamarca ==
- El Quinde Shopping Plaza Cajamarca
- Open Plaza Cajamarca (2T 2014)
- Real Plaza Cajamarca

== Callao ==
- Minka
- Mall Aventura Plaza Bellavista
- Open Plaza Canta-Callao

== Cusco ==
- Mall Aventura Plaza Cusco (2015)
- Mall Power Center San Jerónimo
- Real Plaza Cusco

== Huanuco ==
- Open Plaza Huánuco 2T 2014
- Real Plaza Huanuco

== Ica ==
- Ica
  - El Quinde Shopping Plaza Ica
  - Plaza del Sol Ica
- Chincha
  - Mega Plaza Express Chincha

== Junín ==
- Huancayo
  - Open Plaza Huancayo (2015)
  - Real Plaza Huancayo

== La Libertad ==
- Trujillo
  - Mall Aventura Plaza Trujillo (2007)
  - Open Plaza Los Jardines (2008)
  - Penta Mall Mansiche (strip center)
  - Real Plaza Trujillo (2007)

== Lambayeque ==
- Chiclayo
  - Open Plaza Chiclayo
  - Real Plaza Chiclayo

== Lima ==
=== Lima province ===
- Arenales Mall (1979)
- Bajada Balta Shopping Center
- Balta Shopping (strip center)
- CC La Rambla Breña
- Caminos del Inca
- Camino Real
- CC La Rambla San Borja
- Cento Comercial Jesus María
- Cento Comercial Risso (1975)
- El Polo
- Jockey Plaza Shopping Center (1997)
- Larcomar (1998)
- Lima Outlet Center
- Mall Aventura Plaza Santa Anita
- Mall del Sur - San Juan de Miraflores
- Mega Express Villa
- Mega Express Villa el Salavador
- Mega Plaza Norte
- Molina Plaza
- Monterrico Plaza (2015)
- Open Plaza Angamos
- Open Plaza Atocongo
- Open Plaza La Marina
- Parque Agustino
- Parque El Golf (2015)
- Paso Salaverry (strip) (2014)
- Penta Mall Conquistadores
- Penta Mall Viñedos
- Plaza Norte
- Plaza Lima Sur
- Plaza San Miguel (1976)
- Real Plaza Centro Cívico
- Real Plaza Chorrillos
- Real Plaza Este (2013)
- Real Plaza Primavera
- Real Plaza Pro
- Real Plaza Puruchuco
- Real Plaza Salaverry (2013)
- Real Plaza Santa Clara
- Royal Plaza

=== Barranca ===
- MegaPlaza Barranca

=== Cañete ===
- Boulevard de Asia
- MegaPlaza Cañete

=== Huacho ===
- Plaza del Sol
- MegaPlaza Huaura

== Loreto ==
- Iquitos
  - Mall Aventura Plaza Iquitos (2015)

== Piura ==
- Piura
  - Open Plaza Piura
  - Plaza de la Luna
  - Plaza del Sol Piura
  - Real Plaza Piura
- Sullana
  - Real Plaza Sullana
- Talara
  - Real Plaza Talara

== Puno ==
- Juliaca
  - Real Plaza Juliaca
- Puno
  - Power Center Plaza Vea

== San Martín ==
- Moyobamba
  - Cinerama Plaza (strip center)

== Tacna ==
- Plaza Center Plaza Vea

== Tumbes ==
- Real Plaza Tumbes (2015)

== Ucayali ==
- Pucallpa
  - Open Plaza Pucallpa
  - Real Plaza Pucallpa (2014)
