= Risso Mall =

Shopping mall in Peru

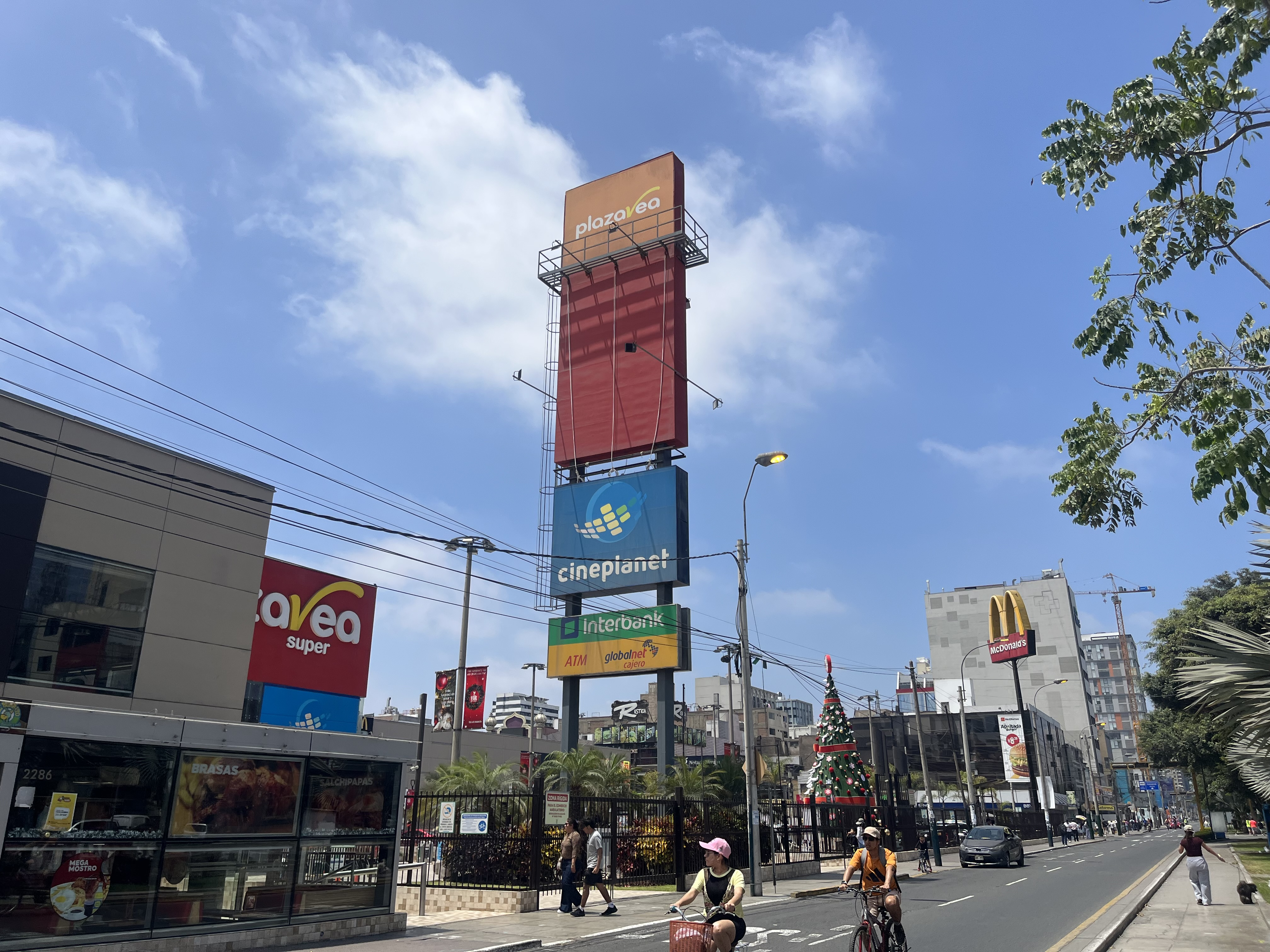
- Location: Lima, Peru
- Address: 2296 Arequipa Avenue
- Opened: 1968
- Developer: Agrem
- Manager: Armando Artoni Risso
- Website: ccrisso.com

Risso Mall (Spanish: Centro Comercial Risso) is a shopping mall located at the 22nd block of Arequipa Avenue, in Lince, a district of Lima, Peru. The mall was inaugurated in 1968, and serves as a local landmark. It is owned by Compañía Inmobiliaria Agrem S.A., a real estate company, and managed by the Risso family.

== History ==
The site was the original location of the Hacienda Lobatón's estate house, owned by brothers Roberto and Manuel Risso Diggione. A project to build a mall was commissioned by the latter during the late 1950s, with architect Jacques Granadino Roberts in charge of its design. Construction began in 1966, and the mall was officially inaugurated in 1968, with anchor tenants Todos, Monterrey, Yompián, Labrousse, Marcantonio, among others. During the Peruvian conflict, the mall's Todos store was firebombed by members of the Túpac Amaru Revolutionary Movement.

The mall was remodelled in the 2000s, with new tenants Plaza Vea, Casino Fortuna and McDonald's opening their doors. A Cineplanet theatre opened its doors in October 2005. It was again remodelled in July 2017. A plan to again expand the mall was proposed by On Retail, a retail focused real estate company commissioned by the mall's owners in 2025.

On January 9, 2020, textile merchant Isaac Hilario Huamanyalli was fatally shot by two Venezuelan hitmen while dining at the mall's McDonald's. The pair were eventually identified and captured by police on January 11. According to a law enforcement investigation, Hilario had been involved in a prostitution ring, likely being shot due to a dispute between two criminal gangs.

== See also ==
- Arenales Shopping Centre
