= Gastronomic Fair in Trujillo =

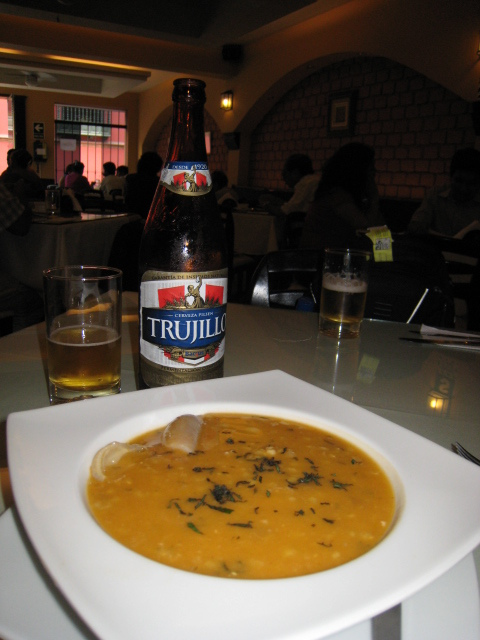
- Shambar is a typical dish of Trujillo city
- Genre: Gastronomy festival
- Begins: November (last edition)
- Ends: November
- Frequency: annual
- Locations: Trujillo city, Peru
- Years active: 2011 - present
- Inaugurated: 2011
- Most recent: 2012
- Attendance: 27.000 (estimated)

Gastronomic Fair of Trujillo called Sabe a Peru is a gastronomy festival held in the Peruvian city of Trujillo. This festival has been held on 17 and 18 November 2012. It took place in Mall Aventura Plaza Trujillo. In 2012 the festival paid tribute to the "mochero chili" for being an indigenous product, Moche culture legacy. Its historical roots are attractive to encourage experiential tourism in ancestral plots of Trujillo.

== Dishes and events ==
Some of the dishes in the festival are theologian soup, pepián of turkey, alfajores, ceviche, shambar, etc. In the festival are presented musical shows as Bareto and Grupo 5 and also are presented typical dances like marinera and tondero. Among cultural expressions presented to the public are also the stands with exhibits of chullos, beads, bracelets and huacos. Among the most representative dishes include:

- Cebiche, is one of the main dishes of the festival and several historical sources claim that this dish originated about 2000 years ago in the ancient Moche culture. which had its capital south of the city of Trujillo. The dish is prepared using 5 basic ingredients: fish fillet cut in chunks with lemon, onion, salt and chili or chili Moche. The dish is added to a variety of ingredients to taste, one result of this combination is mixed cebiche. Fish that can be used are very diverse and include species of both freshwater and sea, also includes other seafood such as shellfish and seaweed and even vegetables. The dish can be accompanied by products such as sweet potatoes, boiled corn, cassava, lettuce leaves, roasted corn, etc. According to historical sources Peruvian ceviche had originated first in the Moche culture on the coast of its present territory for over two thousand years. Different chronicles report that along the Peruvian coast was consumed fish with salt and chili. This dish has been declared National Cultural Heritage by the Peruvian government.
- Shambar, soup made with beans also includes smoked ham. Served with roasted corn. In restaurants traditionally served on Mondays.
- Theologian soup: broth turkey and / or chicken with soaked bread, potatoes, milk and cheese, is traditionally prepared in the district of Moche.
- Beans to the Trujillo: black beans with sesame seeds and chili mirasol.
- Pepián of turkey: turkey stew with rice, ground corn, cilantro and chili.
- Trujillo fish: steamed fish with eggs and onion sauce.
- Mollejitas to the sillao: exquisite dish served with onion salad and boiled yucca.
- The Alfajor de Trujillo, in the festival also were presented the typical alfajores of Trujillo and the manufacturing and consumption of sweets and a series of traditional alfajores; formerly called Alfajor ofTrujillo that has been manufactured by various candy stores being the best known Dulcería Castañeda, this candy store has become a traditional brand of alfajores in the city; since 1925 they have made alfajores and various giant named alfajor king kong formerly known as "Alfajor of Trujillo", "Dulcería Castañeda" currently has several locals. Its main products are their alfajores and which are requested as classics sweet souvenirs of the city of the everlasting spring.
- Drinks, among the highlights typical drinks are chicha of Moche, made of jora; chicha of Magdalena de Cao, etc.

== Gallery ==
Dishes in the Festival
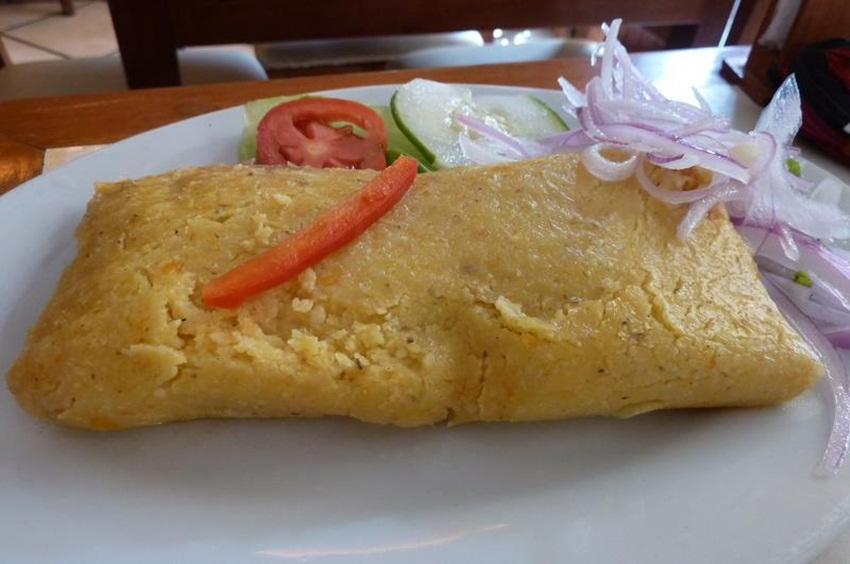
A tamal of Trujillo

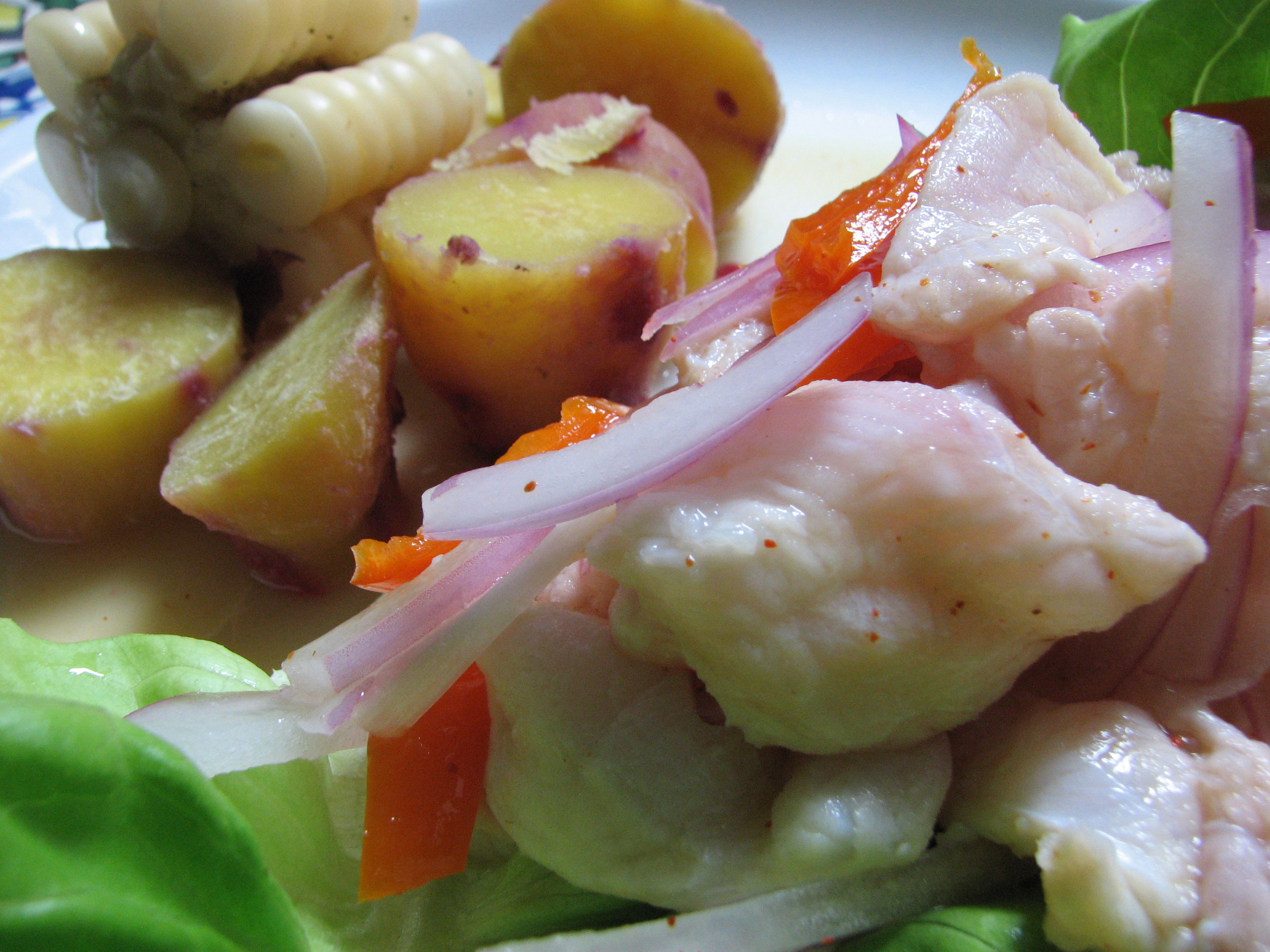
Cebiche

== See also ==
- Trujillo
- Trujillo Marinera Festival
- San Jose Festival
- International Festival of Lyric Singing
- Santiago de Huamán
- Victor Larco Herrera District
- Historic Centre of Trujillo
- Trujillo Book Festival
