= King Kong (dessert) =

Peruvian cuisine dessert

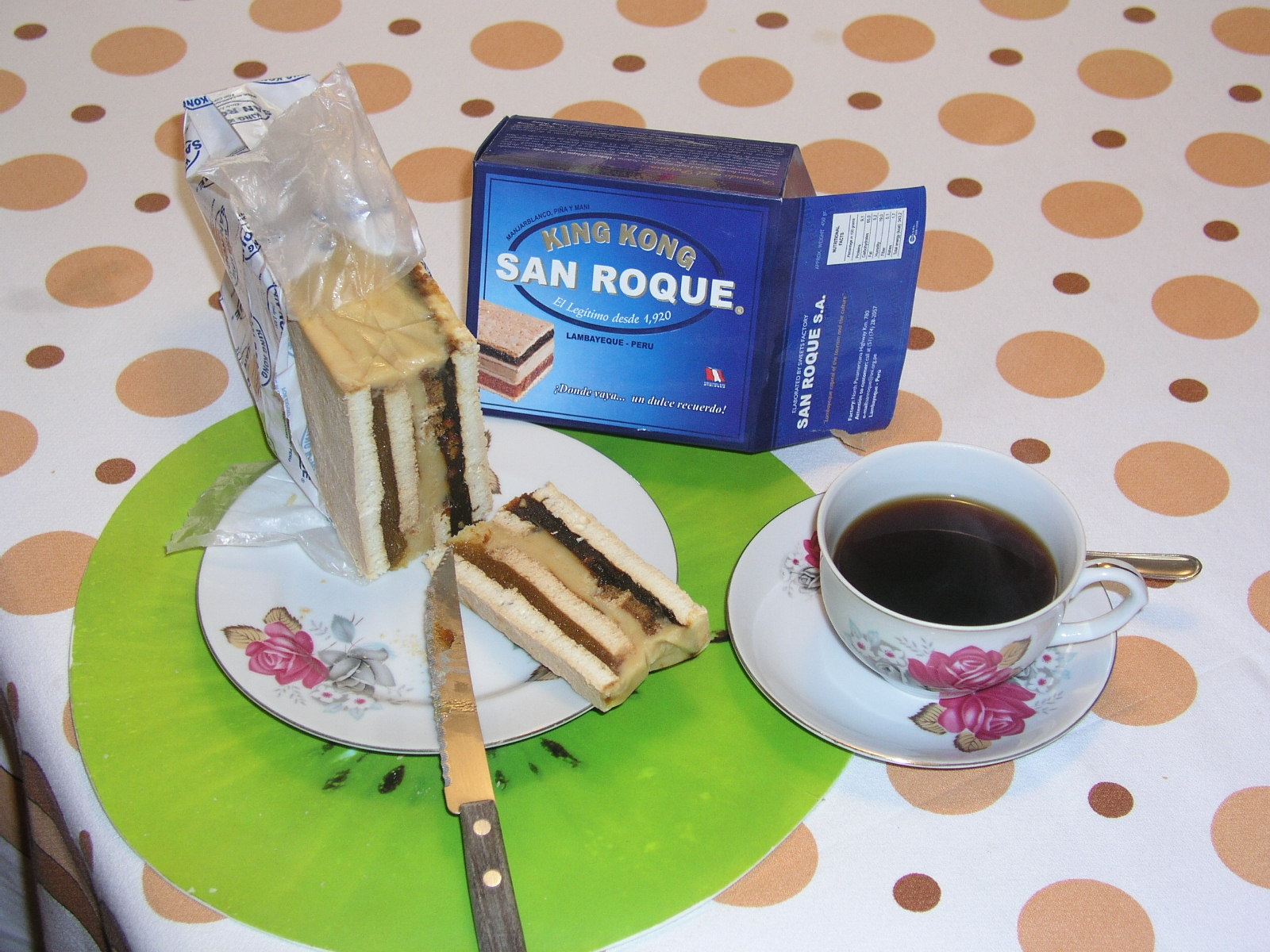
- King Kong from San Roque
- Alternative names: Barra
- Type: Confectionery
- Place of origin: Peru
- Region or state: Lambayeque
- Main ingredients: Cookies (flour, butter, eggs, milk), peruvian blancmange

King Kong is a dessert in Peruvian cuisine. It is made of cookies (made from flour, butter, eggs and milk), filled with Peruvian blancmange, some pineapple sweet and in some cases peanuts, with cookies within its layers. It is sold in one-half and one kilogram sizes. It is part of the culture of Lambayeque Region and nowadays the makers of the dessert are grouped in the King Kong and Typical desserts Producers Association of Lambayeque City.

== History ==
The name of the recipe comes from the film King Kong, which was shown in the city Lambayeque during the 1930s. The citizens compared the mold and size of the sweet with the figure of the big gorilla, baptizing it since then with the name of King Kong. Previously it was known as Alfajor de Trujillo and had a circular shape, although King Kong"is usually rectangular but circular presentations can be found on the market. Nowadays there are many factories that specialize in making this sweet, the most recognized being the company San Roque and "Lambayeque fabrica de dulces", "Huerequeque", "Evocada", and "Tumbas Reales" among others.

== See also ==
- Chiclayo
- Trujillo
