= Shambar =

Peruvian typical soup

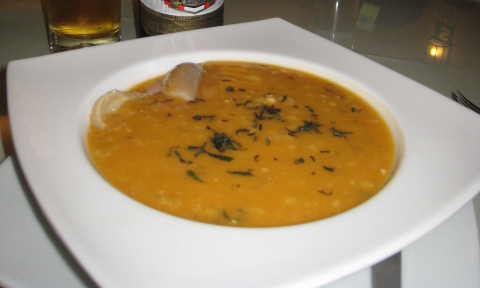
- Type: Soup
- Place of origin: Peru
- Region or state: La Libertad
- Created by: Otuzco
- Main ingredients: Wheat grains, fava beans, green peas, chickpeas, dried beans, meat (chicken, ham, beef); pork skin, ears or tail

Shambar is a soup that blends many ingredients, tastes, and seasonings from Spanish, Criollo, and Andean cultures, considered the most traditional meal in Trujillo's gastronomy in Peru. It is made of wheat grains, fava beans, green peas, chickpeas and dry beans. It must have three kinds of meat, including chicken, ham, beef, and pork skin, ears or tail. The seasoning is done with a blend of garlic, black pepper, cumin, purple chilli pepper (aji panca), yellow chilli pepper (aji mirasol), parsley and vegetable oil.

The dish is highly appreciated for its variety of flavours originating from the spices and meats, and peculiar texture rendered by the mixture of legumes.

== See also ==
- Gastronomic Fair in Trujillo
- Sambar (dish)
- List of soups
