= Alfajor =

Hispanic sweet dessert

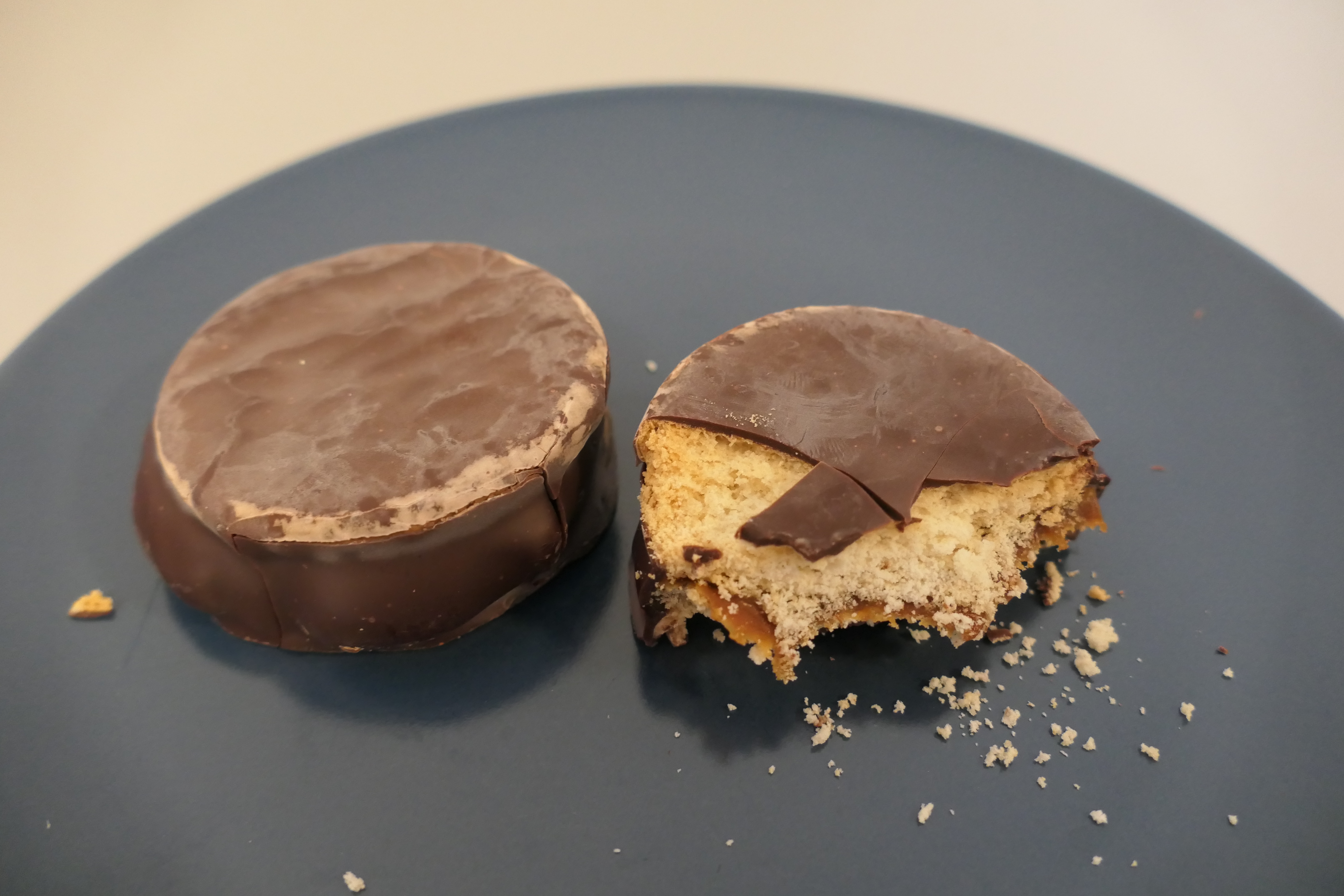
- Two alfajores
- Alternative names: Alfajores
- Course: Sweet or dessert
- Place of origin: Spain
- Serving temperature: Room temperature
- Main ingredients: Flour, honey, almonds, hazelnuts, dulce de leche

An alfajor or alajú (Spanish pronunciation: [alfaˈxoɾ], plural alfajores) is a traditional confection. Originally from present-day Spain, it is found now in Argentina, Bolivia, Southern Brazil, Chile, Colombia, Dominican Republic, Ecuador, El Salvador, Southern France, Paraguay, Peru, the Philippines, Uruguay, and Venezuela.

The alfajor was born in Iberia during the rule of al-Andalus. The Spanish alfajor is produced in the form of a small cylinder and is sold either individually or in boxes containing several pieces.

Traditional alfajores in Argentina, Peru, Uruguay and Venezuela consist of two round, sweet biscuits made of wheat flour or corn flour joined with dulce de leche (known as "manjar blanco" in Peru and as "arequipe" in Venezuela), and optionally coated with powdered sugar. More modern "industrial" varieties in Uruguay and Argentina, are coated with dark or white chocolate (many alfajores are sold in "black" and "white" versions), or simply covered with powdered sugar.

== Etymology and history ==
According to Spanish philologist and dialectologist Manuel Alvar López, alfajor is an Andalusian variant of the Castilian alajú, derived from the Arabic word الفَاخِر, al-fakhir, meaning luxurious, and, contrary to some beliefs that it originated in the New World, was introduced to Latin America as alfajor. The word had been introduced into Spanish dictionaries in the 14th century.

A similar sweet called alaú is found in the Arabic-Hispanic cookbook Kitab al-Tabikh, by an anonymous author. The Spanish grammarian Nebrija noted the word for the first time in his Latin-Spanish Dictionary (1495) as: alfaxor or alaxur. In the 12th century, Raimundo Martin describes in his book Vocabulista another possible etymology of the Hispano-Arabic fasur, meaning "nectar".

The publication of historical dictionaries of the Spanish language allows one to document both forms of the original alajur, written as alajú and alfajor. Alajur and multiple geographic variations are sweets made of a paste of almonds, nuts, breadcrumbs and honey. It is possible that alfajor and alajú were Arabisms introduced into the Spanish language in different places and times, and, supposing both came from the same etymology, from a linguistic point of view, alajú is probably an Arabism of Castilian Spanish, and so it is still alive in Cuenca, Toledo, Guadalajara and in la Sierra de la peña de Francia; meanwhile the variation alfajor is Andalusian and Murcian. In the Americas, the word alfajor was not known until the 19th century.

== In Spain ==
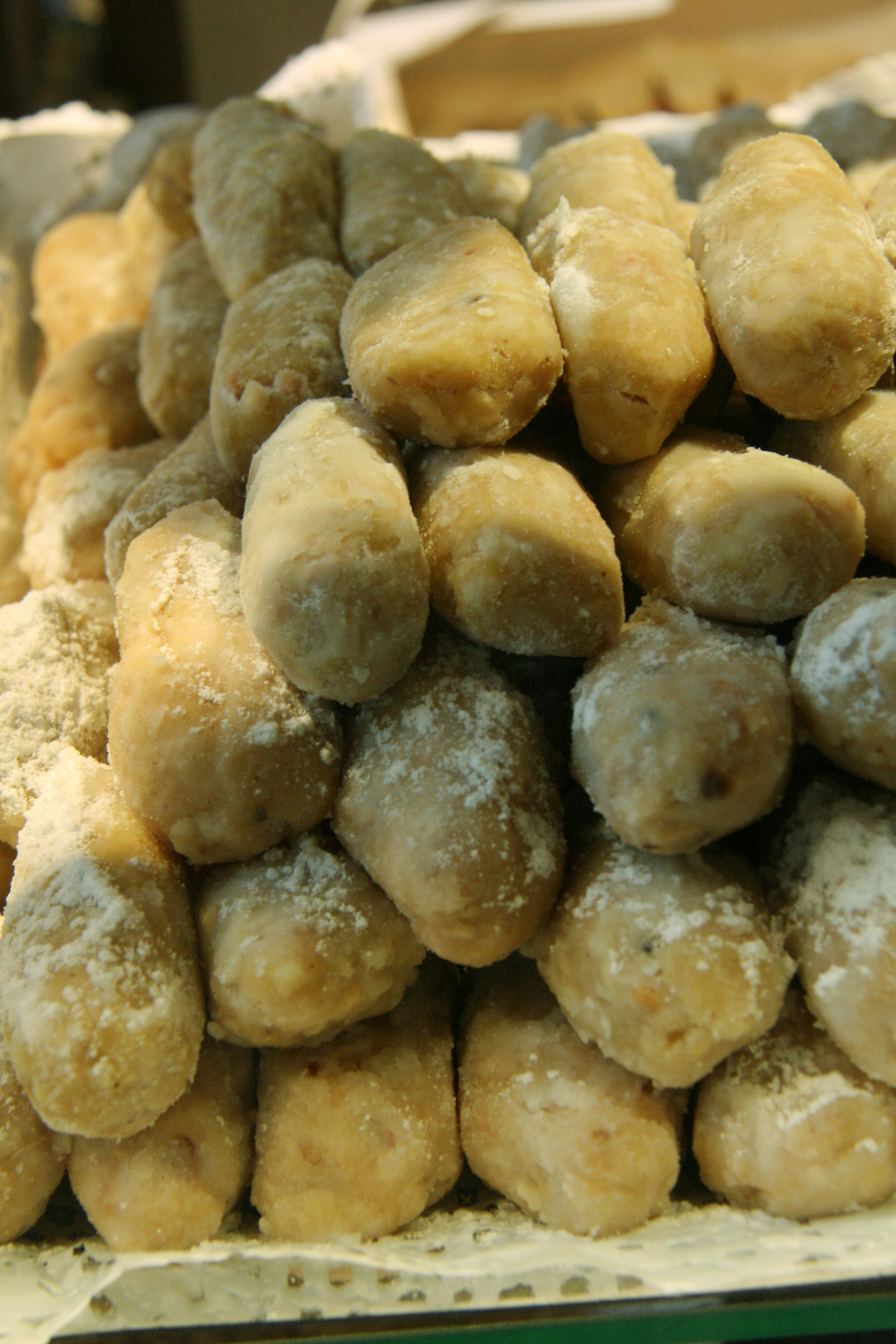
Spanish-style alfajores in Andalusia

In Spain, there are a variety of different recipes for preparing alfajores, but the most traditional contain flour, honey, almonds and several spices, such as cinnamon. Alfajores are most commonly sold around Christmas.

The traditional Spanish alfajor has been produced in Medina-Sidonia (where it is called an alajú) since ancient times, and the recipe has been traditionally handed down from father to son. In this town, there is an account of Mariano Pardo de Figueroa, writing under the pen name Dr. Thebussem, wherein he wrote that on 2 July 1487, Enrique de Guzmán, second count of Medina Sidonia, ordered the council and majors of the region to send to Malaga 50 cows, 50 oxen, 200 calves and provision of alajú from his city.

The recipe documented by the accounts of Thebussem in the 19th century is the following:

For the alfajor or alajú styling, prepare what I say: one quart of white honey, three means of a pound of hazelnuts and almonds, all roasted and chopped, half ounces of cinnamon, two ounces of aniseed, four drachms of cloves and a quarter of cilantro, roasted and ground coffee, a pound of roasted sesame, eight pounds of dust from grinding, out of bagels without salt or yeast, overcooked in the oven, with half a pound of sugar.

Alfajores are still made by craftsmen in Medina Sidonia using natural ingredients that include honey, almonds, hazelnuts, sugar, flour, and breadcrumbs, and mixed with natural spices. The manufacturing process has been respected following a recipe found by Mariano Pardo de Figueroa in 1786. In Medina Sidonia, the annual production of approximately 45,000 kilograms (99,000 lb) is mostly consumed in the province of Cadiz, but they are also famous in Sevilla, Malaga and Huelva.

On 15 September 2004, protected geographical indication was ratified by the Consejo de agricultura y pesca de la junta de Andalucía and published in the Official Journal of the European Union as Alfajor de Medina Sidonia on 6 March 2007. The regulations of the Andalusian Ministry of Agriculture allow the use of only pure honey, almonds, nuts, breadcrumbs, sugar, flour and spices, such as aniseed, sesame, cilantro, cloves and cinnamon. These alfajores are meant to be presented in a cylindrical shape, with a minimum weight of 30 grams (1.1 oz) each, and with a minimum size of about 7 centimetres (2.8 in) in length and a diameter of 1.5 centimetres (0.59 in). Each of them will be protected with a wrapping paper, and the ends made an ornament in a spiral shape with a ribbon out of the same paper. Once individually wrapped, they may be packaged in wood or cardboard boxes, but never in plastic.

In the province of Cuenca, Spain, where the alfajor is called alajú, it is made with almond, honey and figs, wrapped in a wafer.

== In the Caribbean ==
In Puerto Rico, they underwent creolization, lost their almond and gained ground cassava. They can take varying amounts of sugar and spices. It is possible that Puerto Rico's most common version of this dessert (the South American version with dulce de leche) reached Puerto Rico from Venezuela, but the opposite is also possible. Depending on region some add cornstarch, citrus zest, ginger and honey, filled with chocolate, vanilla cream, dulce de leche, fruit paste, or coconut. The filling can be mixed with almonds, sesame seeds, coconut flakes, or sprinkles.

== In South America ==
Traditional "alfajores" in Chile, Argentina,and Uruguay consist of two round, sweet biscuits made of wheat flour or corn starch joined with dulce de leche (known as "manjar blanco" in Peru and as "arequipe" in Venezuela), and optionally coated with powdered sugar. More modern "industrial" varieties in Uruguay and Argentina, are coated with dark or white chocolate (many alfajores are sold in "black" and "white" versions), or simply covered with powdered sugar. These are also known as a Chilean Oreo. One variation is called "alfajor de nieve" (snow alfajor) and has a white coating consisting of a mixture of egg whites and sugar. Most alfajores come packaged in aluminium foil. Alfajores are made in various diameters and are consumed as snacks.

Some of the best-known alfajor brands in South America are the Argentine "Balcarce", "Jorgito", "Capitán del Espacio", "Guaymallen", "Suchard", "Havanna", "Cachafaz", "Juanote" and "Estancia El Rosario", the Uruguayan "Punta Ballena", "Sierra de Minas", "Agua Helada", "Juana la Loca", "Alfajores Portezuelo", "Marley", and Peruvian "Casa del Alfajor".

=== Argentina ===
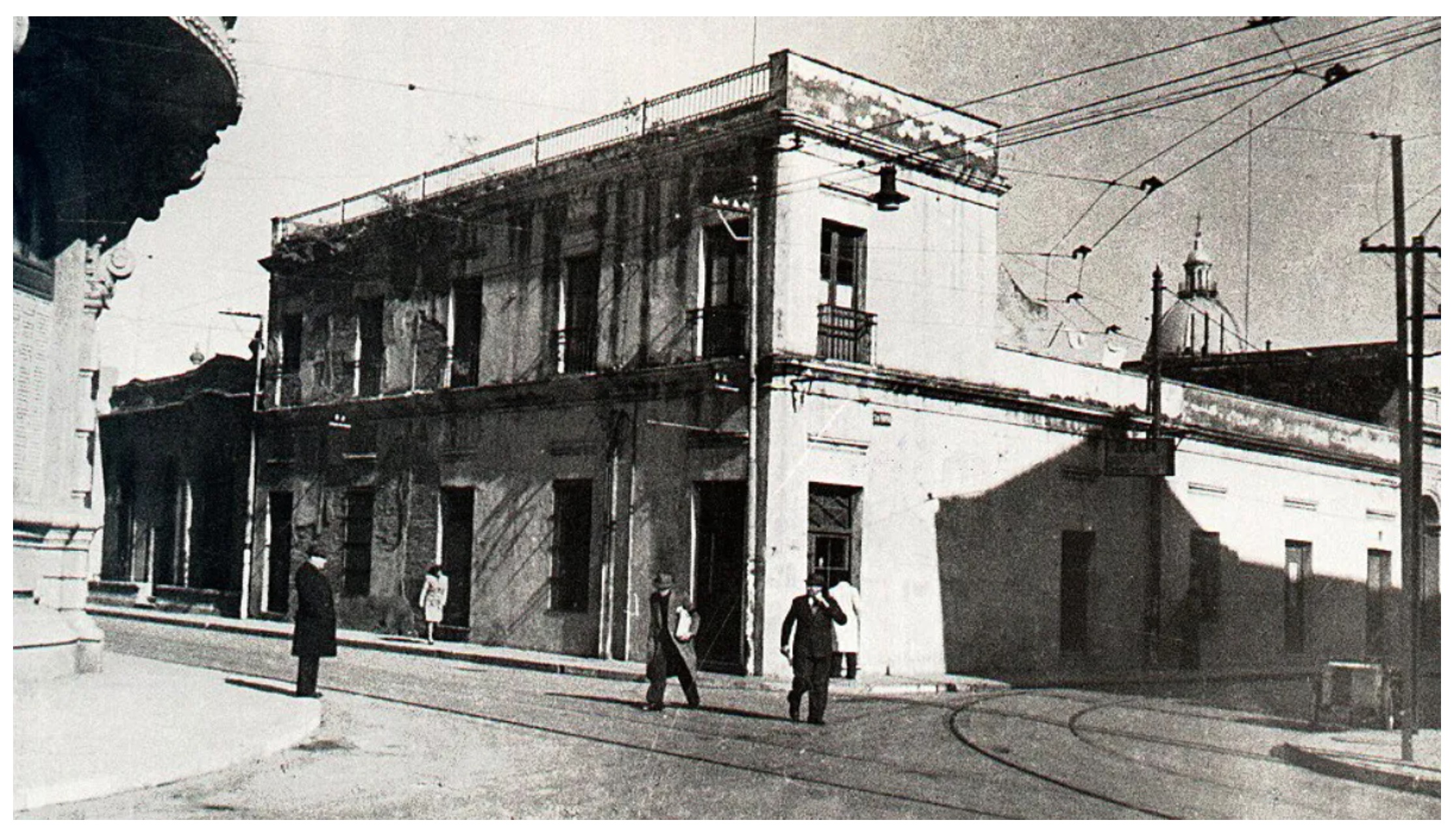
Former Merengo alfajores factory since 1851

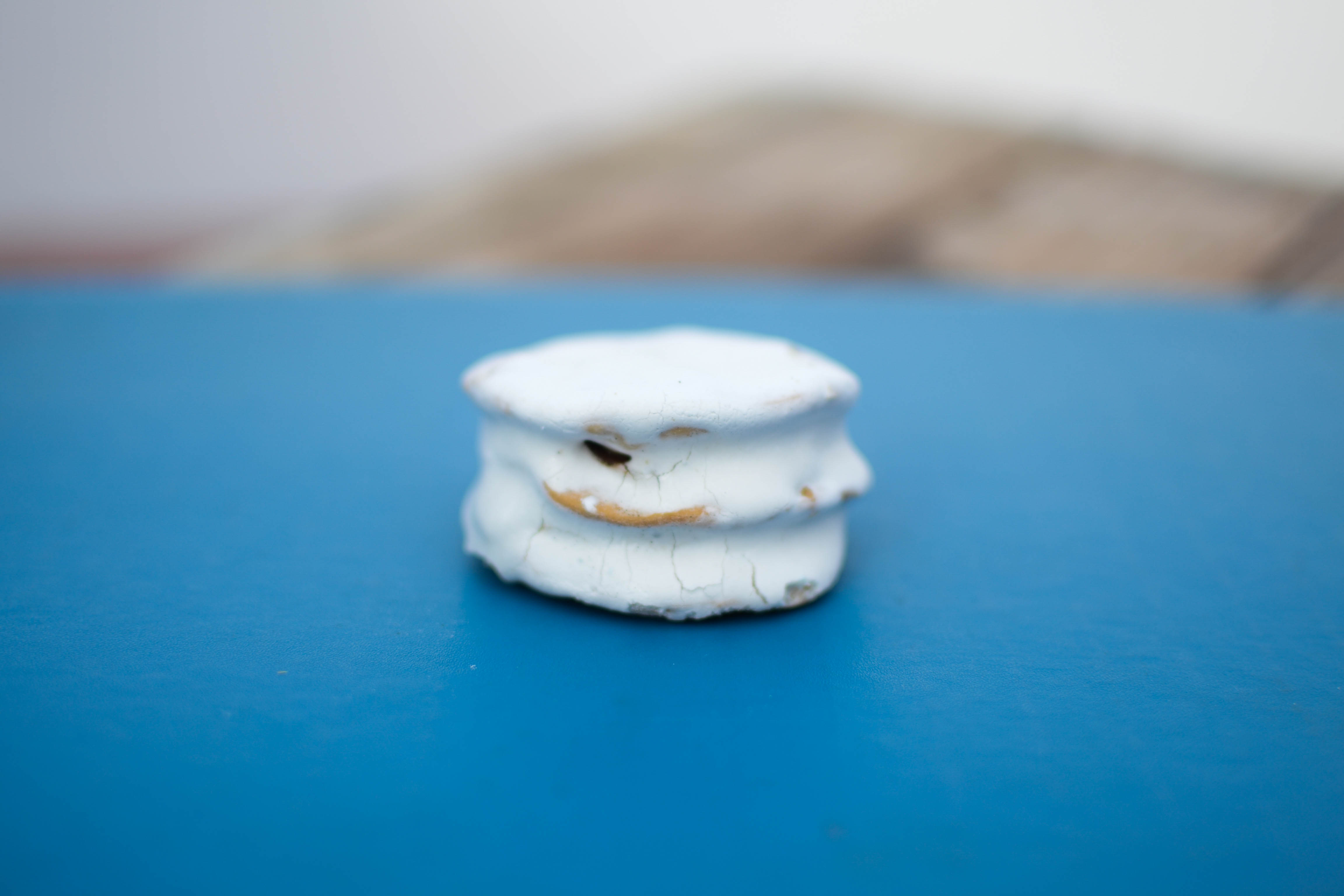
Alfajor Santafesino

The alfajor has been manufactured and consumed since colonial times in the territories that today belong to Argentina. The filling is usually dulce de leche, although there are many variations. They can be covered with powder sugar (the traditional ones), glazed sugar (Santafesinos or "de nieve"), grated coconut or chocolate. Argentina is one of the world's largest consumers of alfajores, both in total numbers and in per capita calculations, consuming more than a billion alfajores a year.

One important Argentine alfajor is the alfajor de Santa Fe or the alfajor santafesino, which has three puff pastry layers adhered to one another with dulce de leche and glazed all over. This alfajor is closely linked to the history of the city of Santa Fe. Colonel Néstor Fernández from Santa Fe took it to the Battle of Caseros in 1851. It became so popular with the army that General Justo José de Urquiza had a weekly shipment of these alfajores delivered to his estancia in San José de Entre Ríos.

The production of Santa Fe alfajores began in 1851 in a shop located on the southwest corner of San Jerónimo and 3 de Febrero streets, a few meters from the Cabildo (where the Santa Fe Government House currently stands). Its owner and creator was Hermenegildo Zuviría, nicknamed "Merengo." Its popularity increased with the Constitutional Convention in 1853:

"On the ground floor and on the upper floor of Merengo, two very important, very Santa Fe-style events were being developed, which would emerge here and have national significance. On the upper floor, Gorostiaga was drafting the text of the Constitution; on the ground floor, Hermenegildo Zuviría, alias Merengo, was making the Santa Fe dulce de leche alfajor. It's the same era, and it's very difficult to find a building that combines, in so few square meters, "the construction of two objects, so different, yet so representative of us Santa Fe residents to the country."

These alfajores became known throughout the country after the 24 writers of the constitution, who, after living in Santa Fe for six months, took this dessert home as a souvenir. Today, it is a heritage of the city of Santa Fe and is handcrafted in that city and its surrounding areas. The nickname "Merengo" gave rise to a brand of alfajores.

The Cordobes alfajor is filled with fruit jellies (generally of quince). In addition, there is the Rogel, similar to the Santa Fe but bigger (the size of a small cake) and a variety from Tucuman known as a clarita, with two crunchy cookies and filled with a jelly made up of sugar molasses.

In Argentina, alfajores made up of cornflour are very consumed as well (covers made up of maize starch, filled with dulce de leche and grated coconut around the filling).

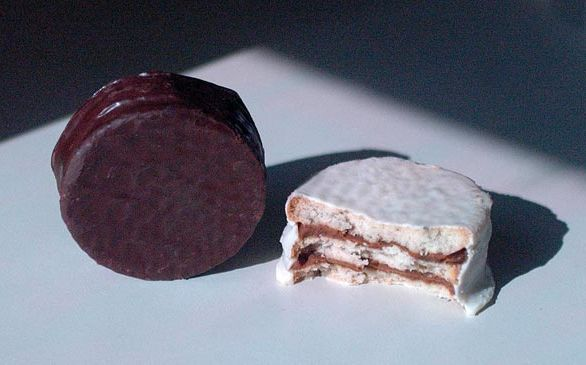
Argentine and Uruguayan alfajores

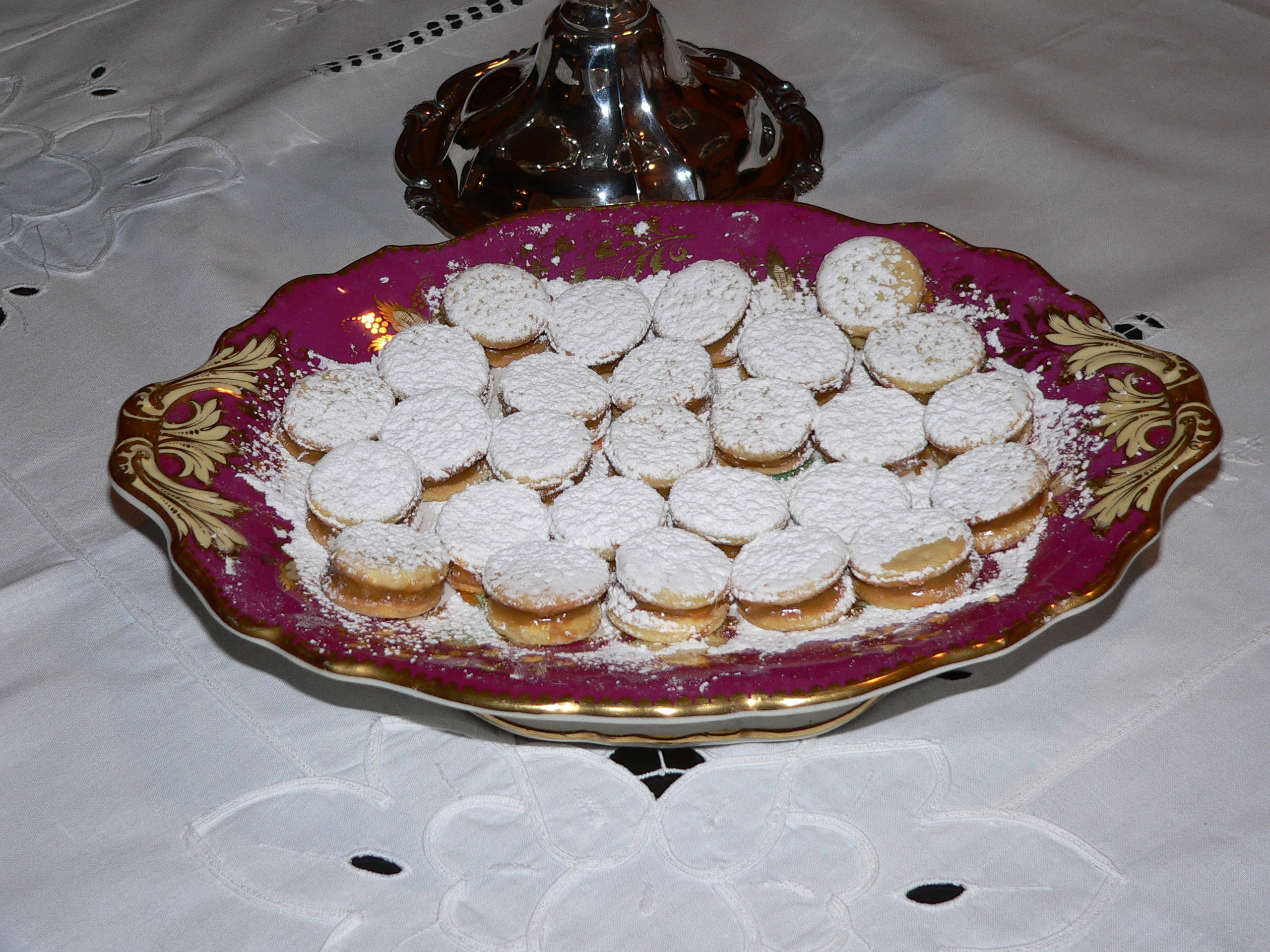
Peruvian alfajores

Mass-production of alfajores traces back to the Atlantic coast of Argentina in the 1950s. Brands such as Havanna and Balcarce, and as many as 30 others, have been introduced into shops and supermarkets. Statistics of the year 2021 shows that inhabitants of Argentina consume 6 million alfajores per day.

=== Chile ===
Two types of alfajores are found in Chile. The first type of alfajor, similar to the one of corn flour prepared in other countries of Latin America, is prepared over all the territory of Chile, but mainly in the central area of Chile. It is known as "candy of corn flour" or, more typically, "chilenitos". The chilenitos are manufactured with corn flour or other types of flour and tend to be simpler and smaller than the other alfajores.

The second type of alfajor, considered the true traditional alfajor of the country and known as "chilean alfajor", is mainly prepared in the southern areas of Chile, generally for the patriotic festivities of September. It is prepared with two hojarascas (a thin and firm cookie) that, since they are previously baked, acquire a curved form. They are adhered to each other with dark brown sugar, panela, manjar or with confectioners cream. Optionally, they can be garnished in the end of the filling with grated coconut as it is the case of the alfajores filled with manjar or with ground nuts.

=== Peru ===
Alfajores made their arrival to the Viceroyalty of Peru, the largest administrative district of the Spanish Empire in South America in the 16th century, and have been popular since, especially the artisanal types.

Alfajor de Trujillo is a type of alfajor from Trujillo. The alfajor de Trujillo has several layers and it can be of different sizes and shapes as round or square. It is made mainly with products as flour, butter, eggs and milk, filled with milk candy, some pineapple sweet and in some cases peanuts, with cookies within its layers. The most famous company manufacturing this products in Trujillo is Dulcería Castañeda, which has locations in Trujillo and Lima and has been making them since 1925. The mass of the alfajor is made of flour, eggs, margarine, salt, and water. The filling is made with figs, quince, walnuts, blancmange. It is one of the products presented in the Gastronomic Fair in Trujillo.

Another variant of the alfajor de trujillo is King Kong milk candy, which is made in both Trujillo and Lambayeque.

=== Uruguay ===
According to Guinness World Records, the biggest alfajor in the world, measuring almost 2 metres (6 ft 7 in) in diameter and 80 centimetres (31 in) in height and weighing 464 kilograms (1,023 lb), was made on 11 December 2010 in Minas, Lavalleja Department, Uruguay. The giant alfajor was made to mark the celebration of Uruguay's first National Alfajor Festival. More than 30 people participated in the preparation of the record-breaking alfajor.

== Gallery ==
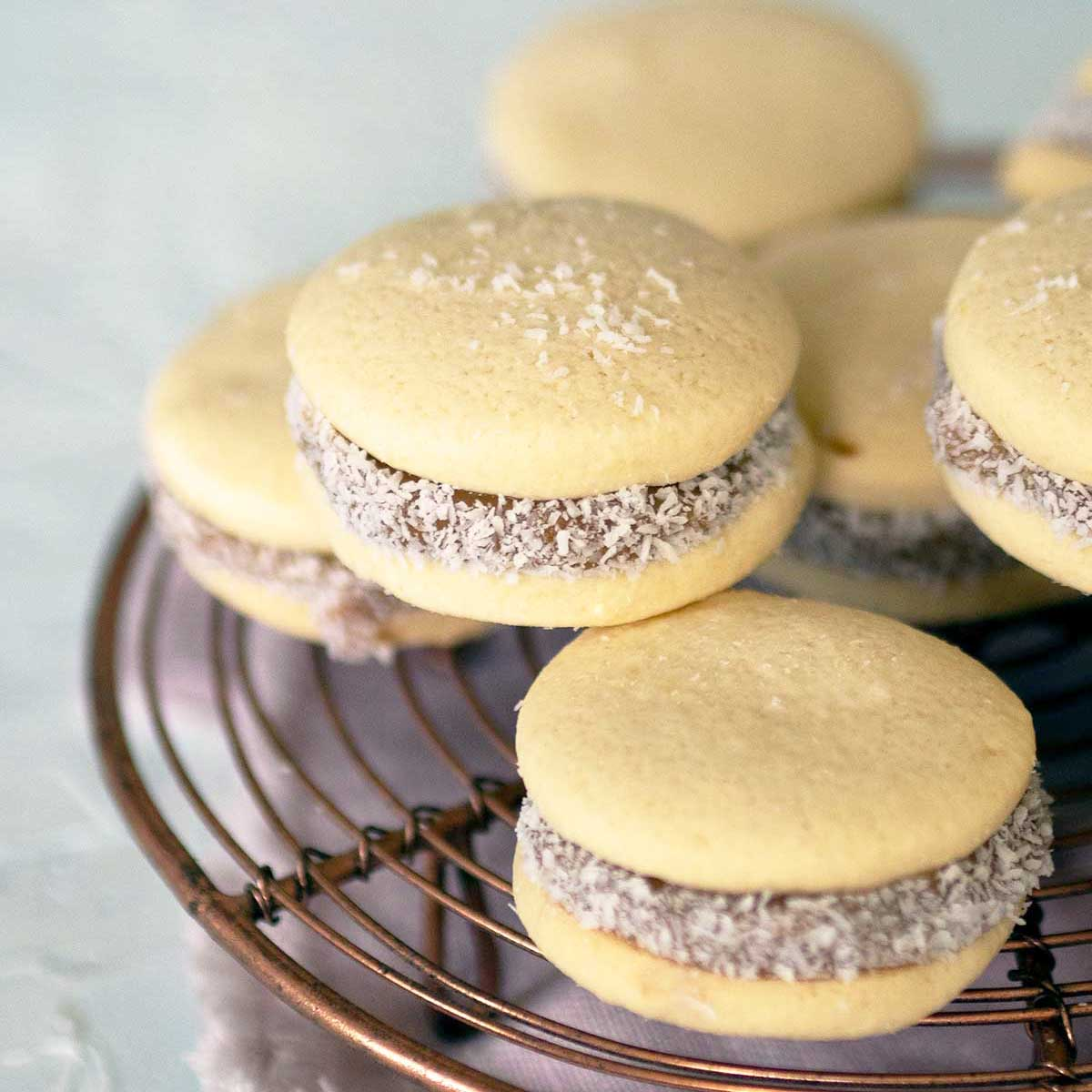
Alfajores de maicena as sold in Argentina

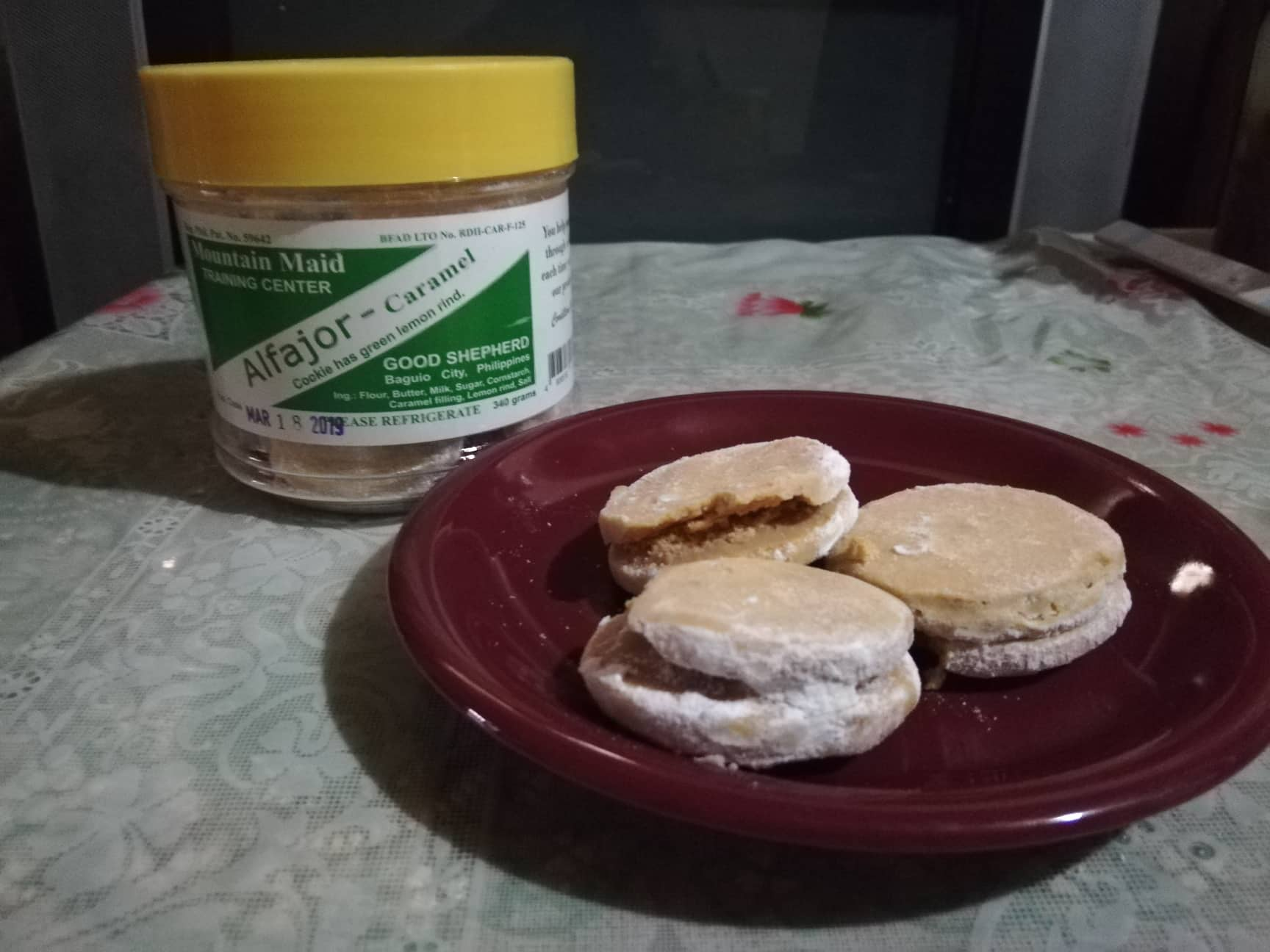
A jar of alfajores produced by Good Shepherd nuns from Baguio, Philippines

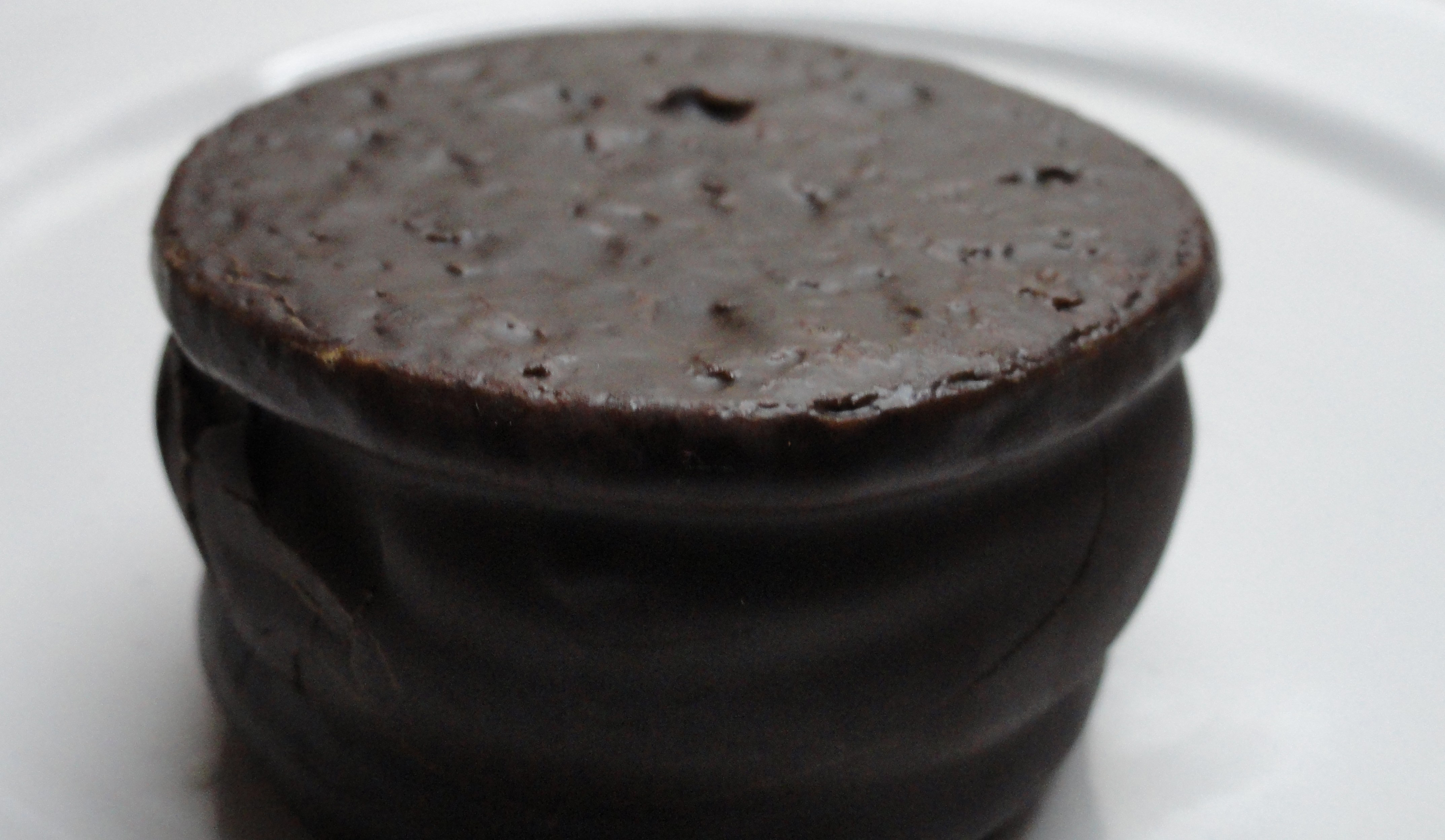
Dark chocolate alfajor

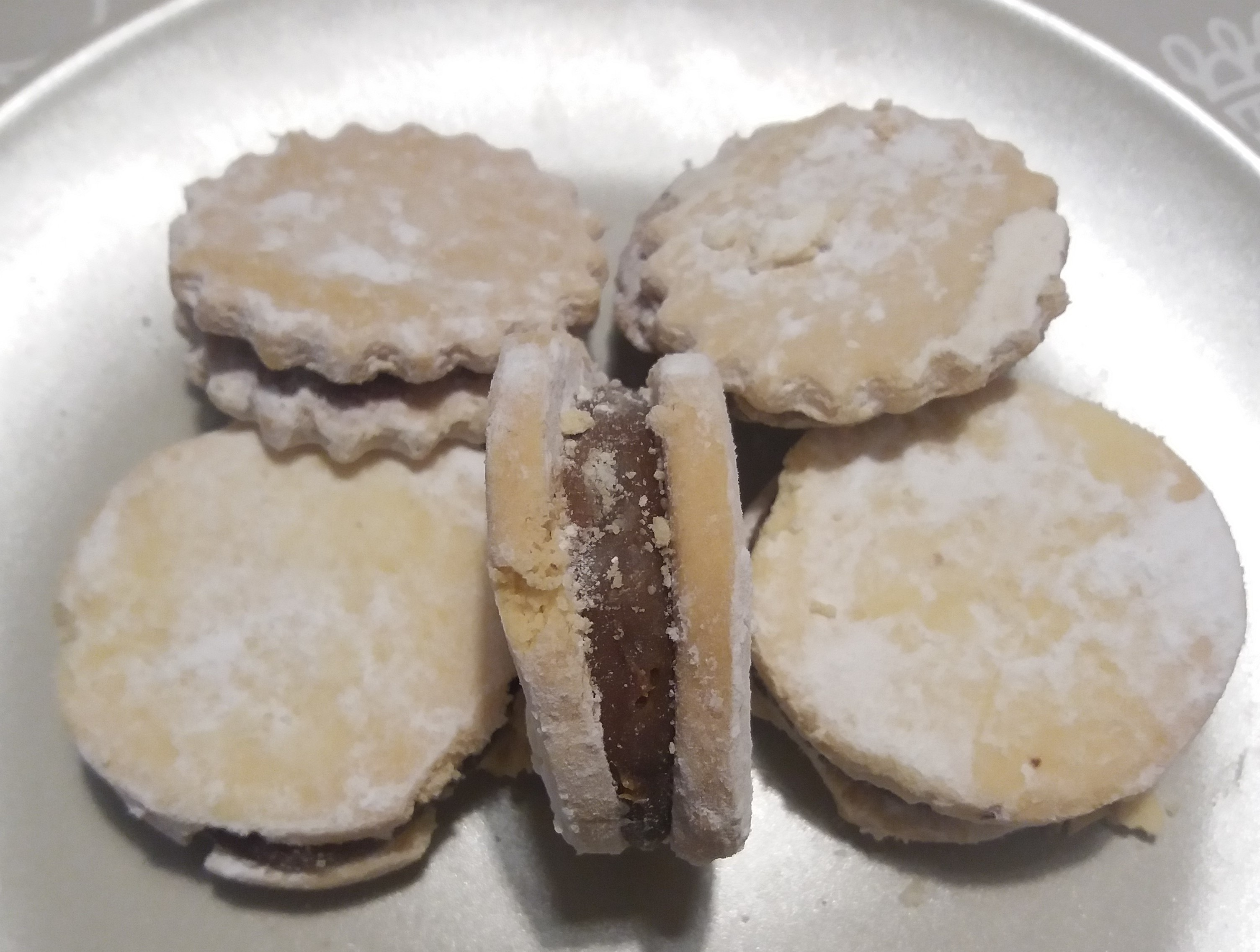
Peruvian alfajor

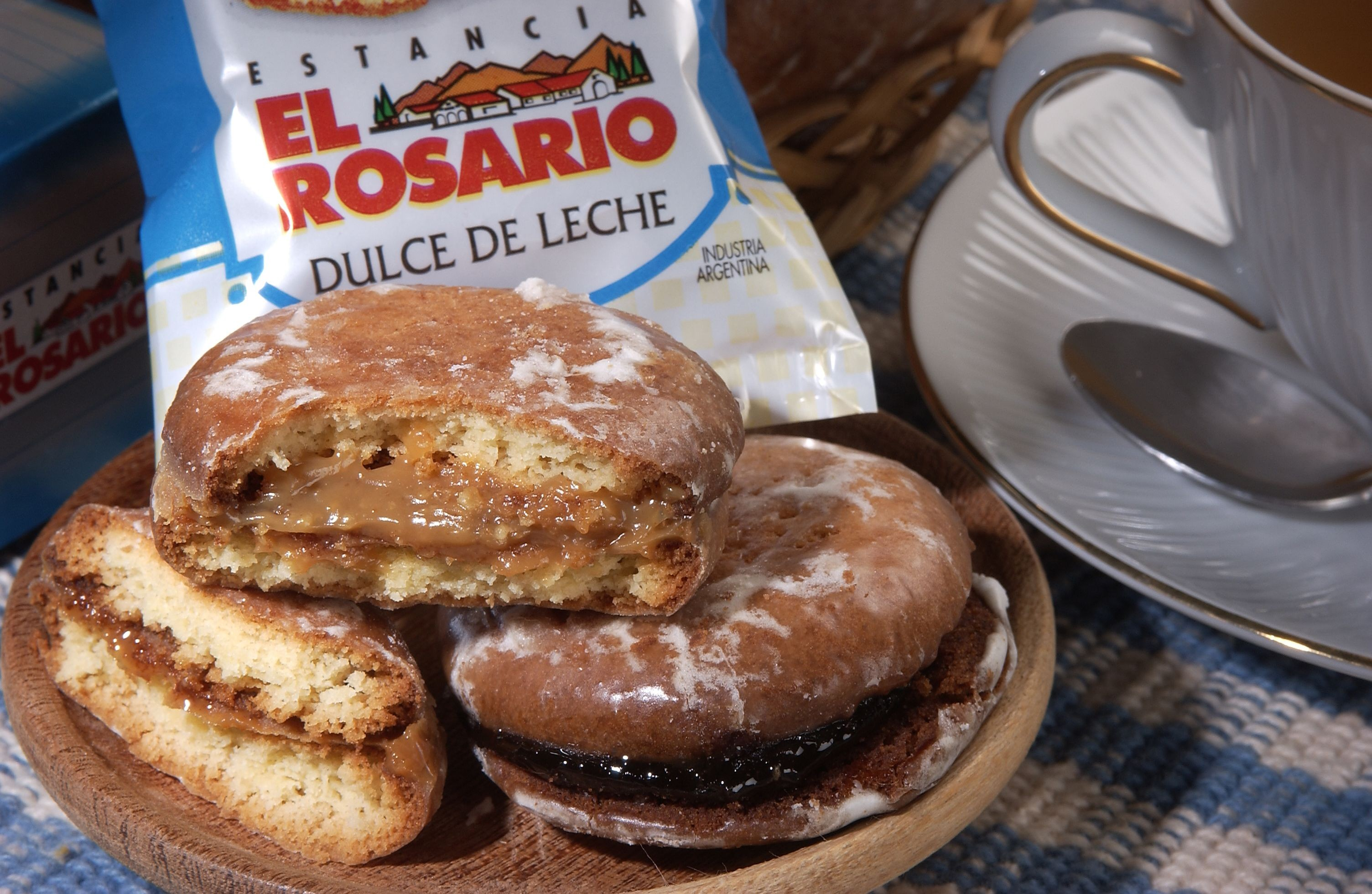
A typical alfajor from Córdoba, Argentina

== See also ==
- Baklava, a Middle-Eastern confection of layered pastry and honey
- List of desserts
- Macaron, a similar French confection
- Mille-feuille, a French confection of layered pastry and cream
- Pirouline, a cream-filled tubular wafer cookie
- Wagon Wheel (Commonwealth), Choco pie (Korea), and Moon pie (United States), similar snacks with a marshmallow filling
