= Open Plaza Los Jardines =

Shopping center in Trujillo, Peru

Open Plaza Los Jardines is a shopping center of 25,000 m^{2} located in the Peruvian city of Trujillo, in the locality called Los Jardines, east of the Historic Centre of Trujillo. It belongs to Malls Peru is owned business unit of Falabella Perú. This mall, called format Power Center by the same company, is characterized by at least four local anchor present here as Sodimac and Tottus hypermarkets, smaller operators are also present around anchor stores such as Do it, Coolbox, Boticas BTL, Topitop, etc. and a food court and a Financial Boulevard. This mall was built on what was the former Los Jardines Hotel and it opened on December 3, 2008 with an investment of 26 million dollars. Open Plaza Los Jardines is the 5th mall that Malls Peru company has constructed in the country.

== Related companies ==
- Mall Aventura Plaza Trujillo
- Real Plaza Trujillo
