= Real Plaza Trujillo =

Shopping mall in Peru

Coordinates: 8°7′57″S 79°1′51″W

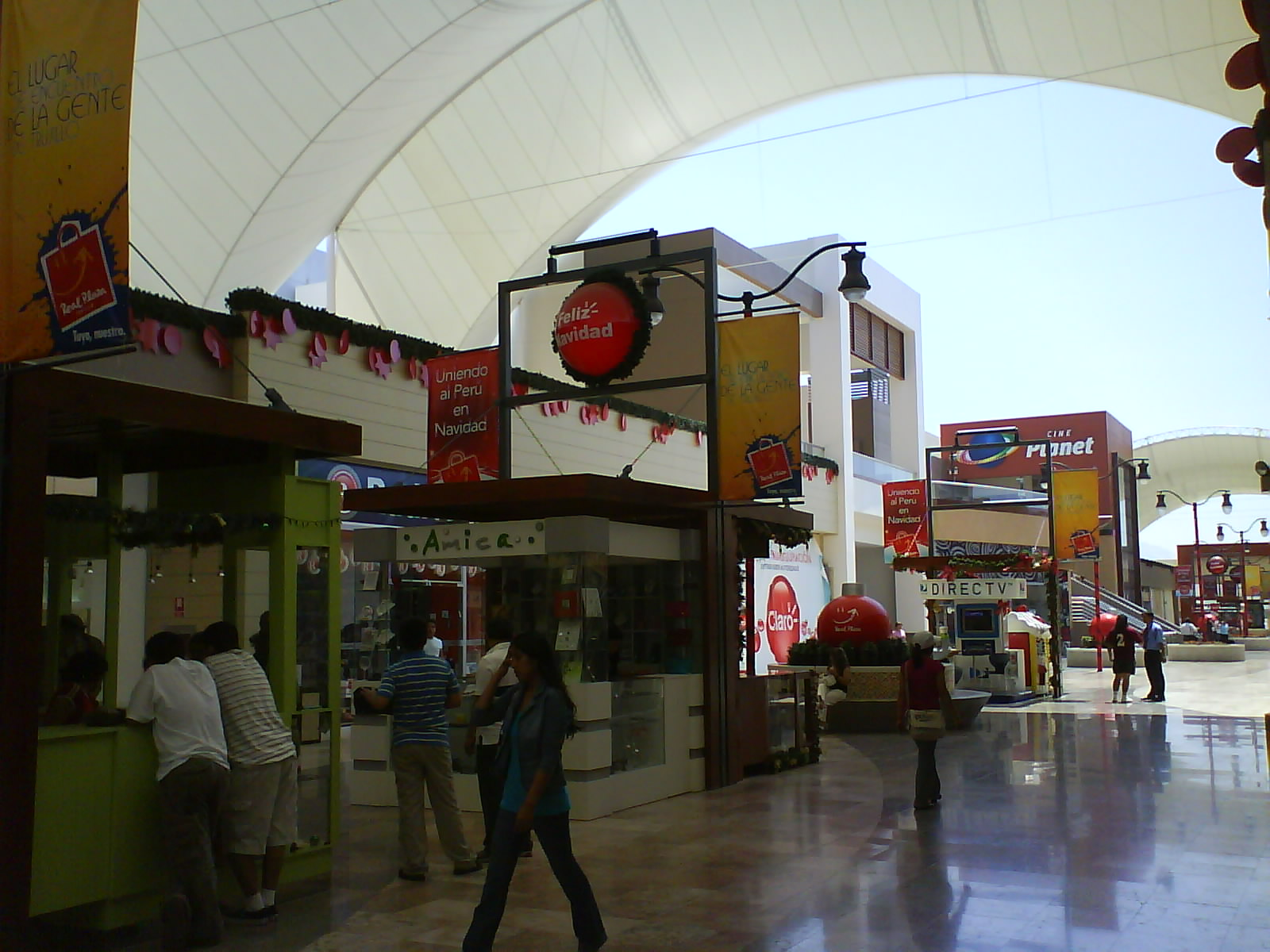
Boulevard principal del centro comercial

The Real Plaza Trujillo is a shopping mall located in the city of Trujillo, in the La Libertad Region of northern Peru. It is part of the Real Plaza chain operated by InRetail (Intercorp). The mall was inaugurated on 15 November 2007, becoming the first complex of its kind in the city.

== Overview ==
The shopping center was built on a plot of 81,000 m^{2} at the intersection of Cesar Vallejo West and Fátima avenues, southwest of the Historic Centre of Trujillo. During its construction it generated more than 1,000 direct jobs and a similar number of indirect jobs. The Real Plaza Trujillo shopping center was opened on 16 November 2007, and during the following years it received expansions and remodeling, among them the food court in 2016.

Real Plaza Trujillo includes retail stores, restaurants, a cinema, a hypermarket, and entertainment areas. It has become one of the main commercial hubs of the city, attracting visitors from Trujillo and neighboring provinces.

In 2023, then-mayor of Trujillo Arturo Fernández ordered the closure of Real Plaza due to its structural deficiencies and maintained that "the appropriate thing would have been its demolition". However, it was reopened to the public in January 2024 amid pressure from other politicians.

== 2025 roof collapse ==
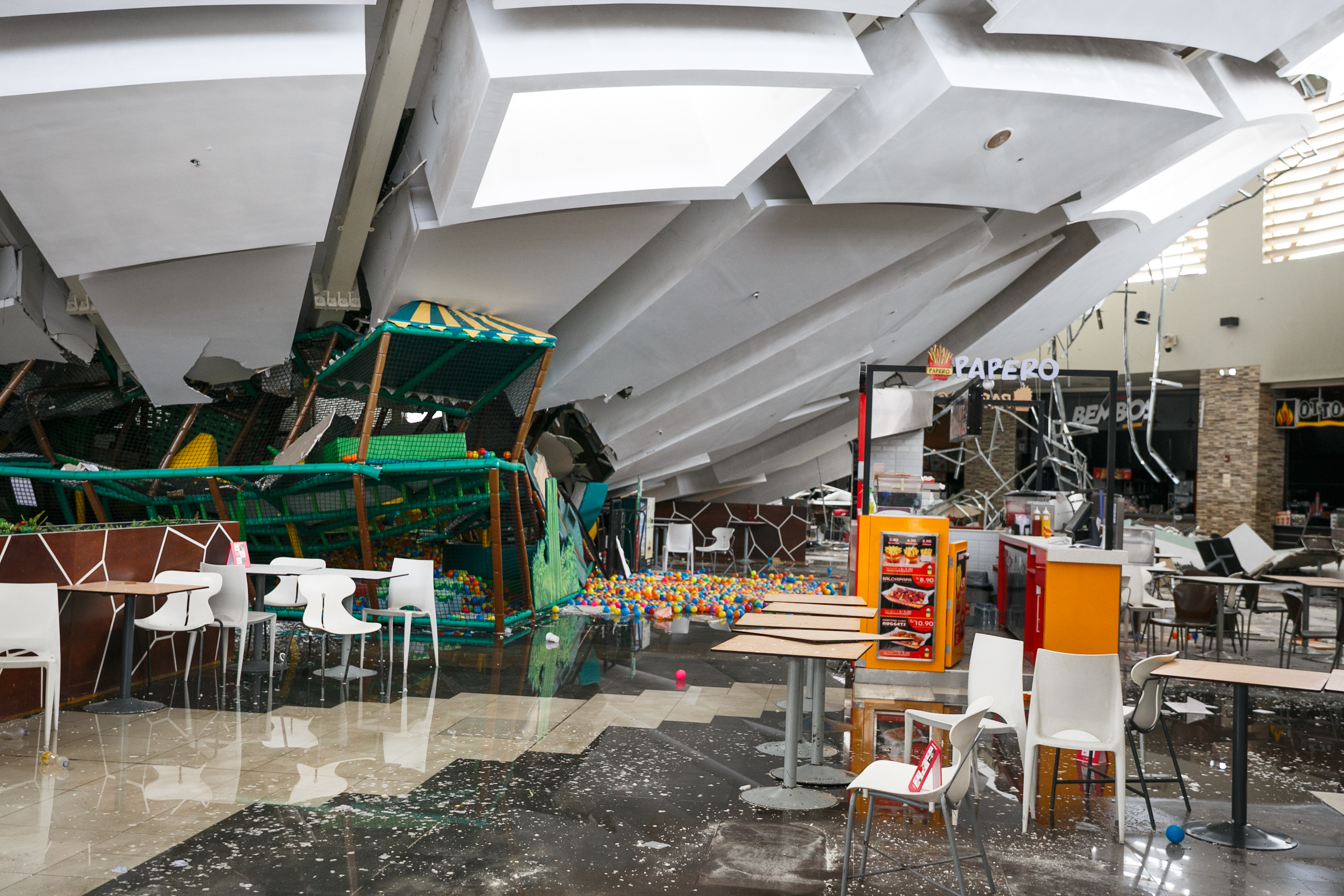
The food court after the collapse

On 21 February 2025 at approximately 20:40 (PET), the shopping center experienced a structural failure when part of its roof collapsed. The incident resulted in at least eight confirmed fatalities, including children, and left 84 people injured. The collapse primarily affected the facility's food court area and children's play section. Following investigations, the shopping center's owner, Intercorp, was fined for not complying with security standards.

=== Damage and casualties ===
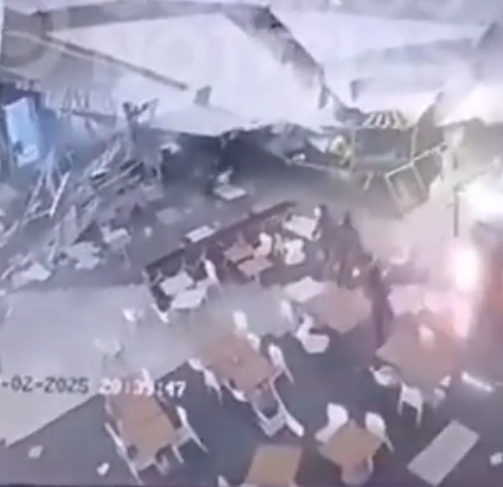
A CCTV still of the food court after the collapse

The structural failure occurred while over 300 people were present in the shopping center, including numerous families with children. Witnesses reported hearing a loud explosive sound immediately before the roof collapsed. The incident created a large cloud of debris, with the majority of the damage concentrated in the building's food court area. The collapse also affected an area that included a children's play zone.

The collapse killed six people, including at least one child. Of the 84 people injured, several were transported to various medical facilities including the Trujillo Teaching Hospital and the Hospital Belén de Trujillo.

=== Response ===
Emergency response teams immediately initiated search and rescue operations at the site of the collapse. Rescue workers were hindered due to a lack of specialized machinery for debris removal, leading to criticism of local authorities and mall management for not immediately engaging private companies with appropriate equipment. The Ministry of the Interior coordinated the deployment of rescue experts to the scene.

During the rescue efforts, emergency personnel established communication with trapped survivors, including a young girl who managed to record footage of her surroundings when she was trapped underneath the rubble. Family members of missing individuals reported difficulties obtaining official information of their relatives during the initial rescue phase. Recovery efforts continued into the following day, with the first body being recovered from the rubble on 22 February. Rescue workers used sticks to help remove debris and free trapped victims.

=== Investigation ===
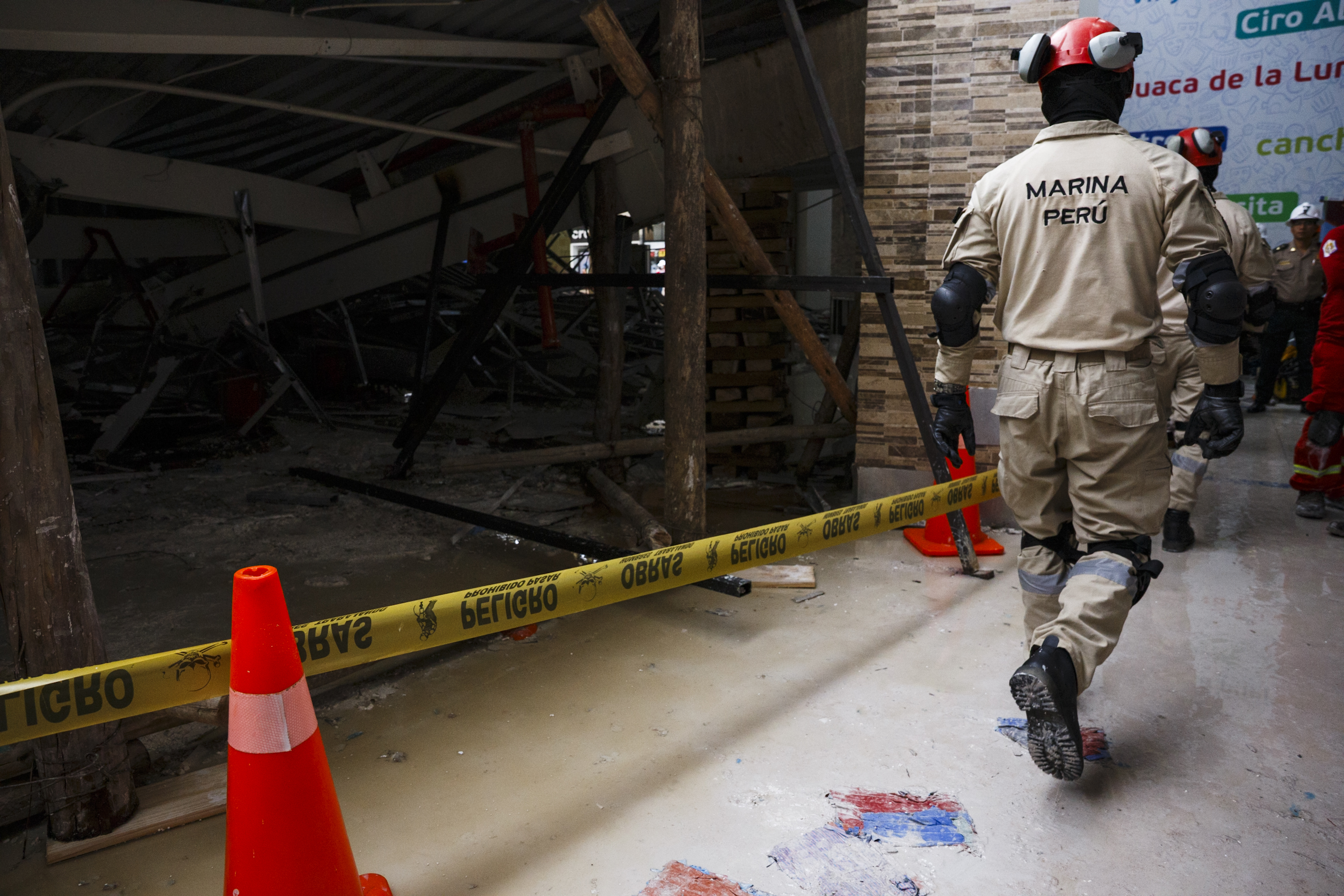
Peruvian Navy rescue teams at the Real Plaza

Initial investigations focused on potential structural issues and compliance with safety standards. Manager of Supervision and Inspection at Ositrán Francisco Jaramillo suggested that water accumulation on the roof might have contributed to the collapse. The incident occurred following a period of heavy rainfall along Peru's northern coast, affecting regions including Piura, La Libertad, Tumbes, and Lambayeque. The Risk and Disaster Manager of the Municipality of Trujillo defended the building's structural integrity, stating the materials and construction were of good quality and relatively new.

The collapse also highlighted ongoing concerns about building safety in Peru. The Peruvian Chamber of Construction (CAPECO) earlier reported that approximately 80% of buildings in the country are constructed informally, with half of these structures considered potentially unable to withstand seismic activity due to construction deficiencies.

The Supervisory Agency for Investment in Public Transport Infrastructure reported that "excess water retained on the roof due to the rainy season" may have contributed to the collapse. According to engineer Darwin La Torre, there was not a drainage system installed and an estimated 100 kilograms (220 lb) per 1 square metre (11 sq ft) of water collected on the roof, which was only designed to support 30 kilograms (66 lb) per 1 square metre (11 sq ft).

Independent media investigated the conditions of the structure prior to the collapse. The weekly program Hildebrandt in its Thirteen reported that prior to the collapse, support elements in the mall had begun to deteriorate and management refused to review them and provided photographs as evidence. The newspaper Panorama also reviewed reports of the structure deteriorating, noting that beams and studs were covered in rust.

Indecopi fined Intercorp more than 500,000 soles in August 2025 for non-compliance with protocols during the collapse of the roof. Indecopi again fined Intercorp an amount of 8 million soles in January 2026 citing non-compliance of established security standards.

=== Reactions ===
Real Plaza management released a statement expressing condolences to the victims' families, and announced the temporary closure of all their shopping centers nationwide as a gesture of mourning. Real Plaza management stated they had complied with all required maintenance and supervision requirements prior to the disaster, citing a successful inspection in September 2024 with no structural issues identified. The Association of Shopping Centers and Entertainment of Peru (ACCEP) president Carlos Neuhaus announced that associated shopping centers would assume costs for victims.

President Dina Boluarte expressed her condolences to the families of the victims, mentioning that "we cannot allow economic interest to take precedence over well-being and life, a legal good that should be above any other" requesting that the corresponding investigations be carried out and those responsible be punished with a "severe" penalty. Interior Minister Juan José Santiváñez estimated that the area of the roof collapse covers 700 to 800 square meters. He estimated that hydraulic canes were needed "to lift part of the roof that has not yet been removed because it is so heavy and to continue rescue operations for those who may be trapped". The National Elections Board released a public statement giving condolences to victims of the tragedy, and demanded immediate investigations into the cause of the structural failure. The regional government of La Libertad declared a period of mourning for 22–23 February 2025, ordering flags to be flown at half-mast in honor of the victims.

The Peruvian Association of Consumers and Users called for an investigation into potential violations of consumer safety rights and demanded sanctions against responsible parties. Following the collapse, the Peruvian Football Federation suspended a scheduled match between Universitario and Atlético Grau at the Estadio Mansiche.

== See also ==
- Historic Centre of Trujillo
- Intercorp
- Trujillo, Peru
- List of building and structure collapses

== Related companies ==
- Mall Aventura Plaza Trujillo
- Open Plaza Los Jardines
