= Mall Aventura Plaza Trujillo =

Shopping mall in Trujillo, Peru

Mallplaza Trujillo
- Location: Trujillo, Peru
- Address: Avenida Mansiche 2112
- Opened: November 30, 2007
- Floors: 2
- Website: mallplaza.com/pe/trujillo/index.html

Mallplaza Trujillo, formerly Mall Aventura Plaza Trujillo, is a shopping mall located between Mansiche avenue and America Oeste avenues, near San Salvador de Mansiche, in Trujillo, Peru. Part of the Mallplaza retail chain, it is the largest of its type in the city.

== History ==
The mall was inaugurated on November 30, 2007. It housed the first McDonald's restaurant outside of Lima, inaugurated on March 3, 2008.

In November 2012, the second edition of Sabe a Perú, the city's gastronomic fair, was held in the shopping centre.

Since 2025, it operates under the Mallplaza name.

== Retail tenants ==
The mall has the following anchor stores:

- Falabella
- Ripley
- Tottus
- Sodimac
- Claro
- Movistar
- Cinemark
- Coney Park

== See also ==
- Open Plaza Los Jardines
- Real Plaza Trujillo
