= Caminos del Inca =

Caminos del Inca (Spanish for "Roads of the Inca") may refer to:

- Inca road system, extending along western South America.
- Caminos del Inca Rally, a nationwide race event in Peru.
- Avenida Caminos del Inca, located in Lima, Peru.
  - Caminos del Inca Shopping Centre, named after the avenue.
