= Arenales Shopping Centre =

Mall in Peru

- Centro Comercial Arenales
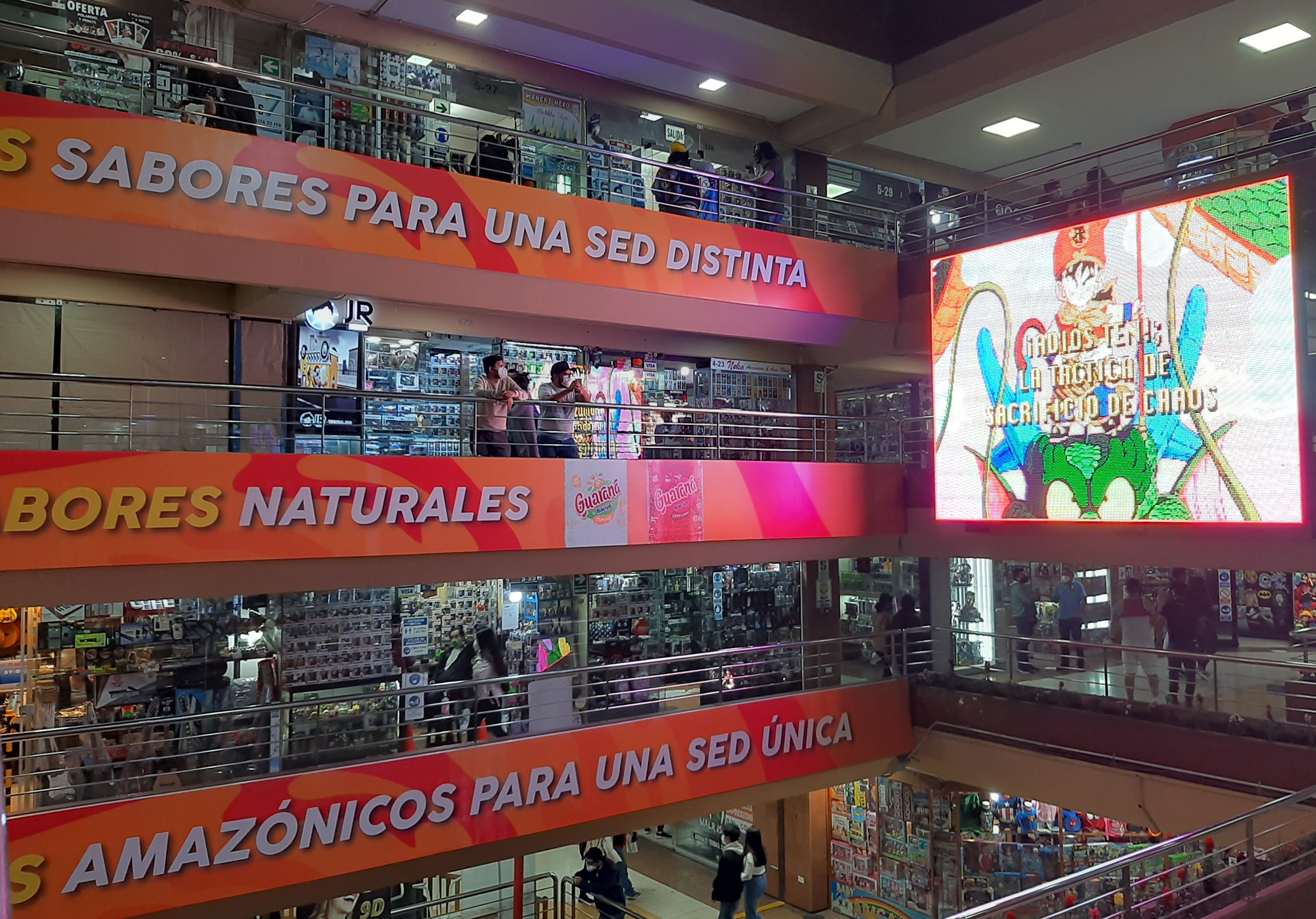
- Interior view in 2020
- Location: Lince District, Lima
- Coordinates: 12.0817937°S 77.03569909°W
- Address: 1737 Arenales Avenue
- Opened: 1979
- Num. of stores: 100+
- Floor area: 21,100 m^{2}
- Floors: 5
- Parking: 200 vehicles
- Website: Facebook

Arenales Shopping Centre (Spanish: Centro Comercial Arenales), also known as Arenales Plaza and as Arenitas, is a shopping centre in Lince District, Lima, Peru. It takes its name from the avenue where the building is located on its 17th block. It is known as the "heart of otaku and gamer culture" in the city.

Several stores dedicated to Korean and Japanese cuisine are located inside the building. A number of stores also sell anime-related items, such as DVDs, or stuffed animals and figures, and cosplay of various anime and manga characters is popular as well.

== History ==
The 5,500 m^{2} (later 21,100 m^{2}) building began construction in 1978. In November of the next year, it inaugurated its first floor and basement. The second floor was finished in September 1981, and its third floor in December 1983. It has 120 stores, two cinemas, and a capacity for 200 vehicles. Since the 1990s, stores oriented towards the anime and otaku subcultures have made the building the focal point of adherents of these subcultures.

In 2010, a Metro supermarket was opened in the building, occupying an area of 1,215 m^{2} and being the fifth to open on the same year.

In 2020, the shopping centre was closed for not having a building safety certificate. In July of that year it announced its reopening amid the COVID-19 pandemic.

== See also ==
- Culture of Peru
