= Merced station =

Merced station may refer to:

- Merced station (Amtrak), in California
- Merced station (California High-Speed Rail)
- Merced metro station, in Mexico City
