= List of botanical gardens in Peru =

Botanical gardens in Peru have collections consisting entirely of Peru native and endemic species; most have a collection that include plants from around the world. There are botanical gardens and arboreta in all states and territories of Peru, most are administered by local governments, some are privately owned.

- Botanical garden of the historic sanctuary of Machu Picchu, Aguas Calientes
- Etnobotanic garden Nugkui, Jaén
- Etnobotanic garden Felipe Marin Moreno Pisaq, Pisaq
- Botanical garden of the Parque de las Leyendas, Lima
- Trujillo Botanical Garden, Trujillo
