= Convent of La Merced, Mexico City =

Religious building in Mexico

Coordinates: 19°25′46.14″N 99°7′40.21″W

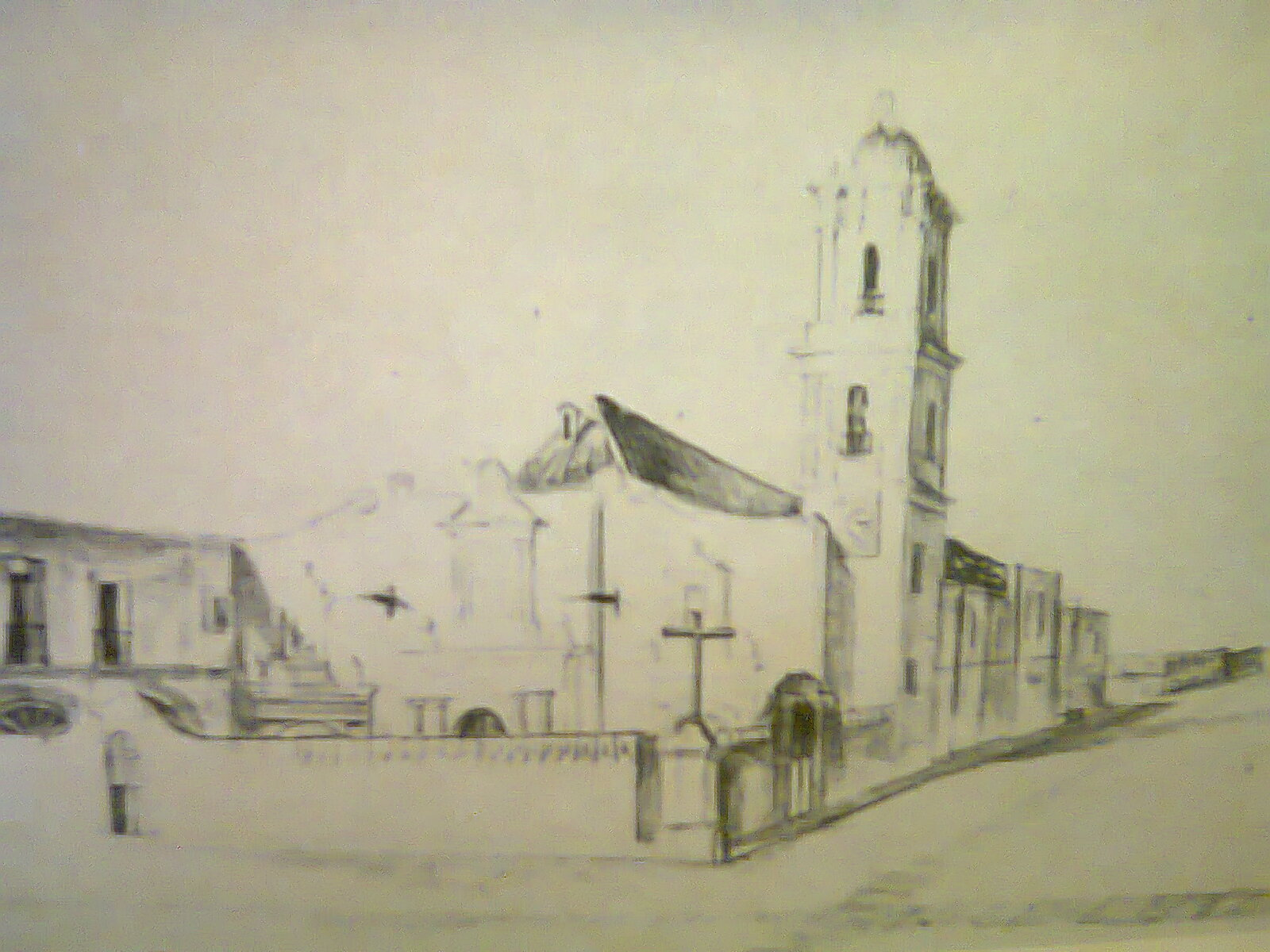
Full Convent of Nuestra Señora de La Merced watercolor painting

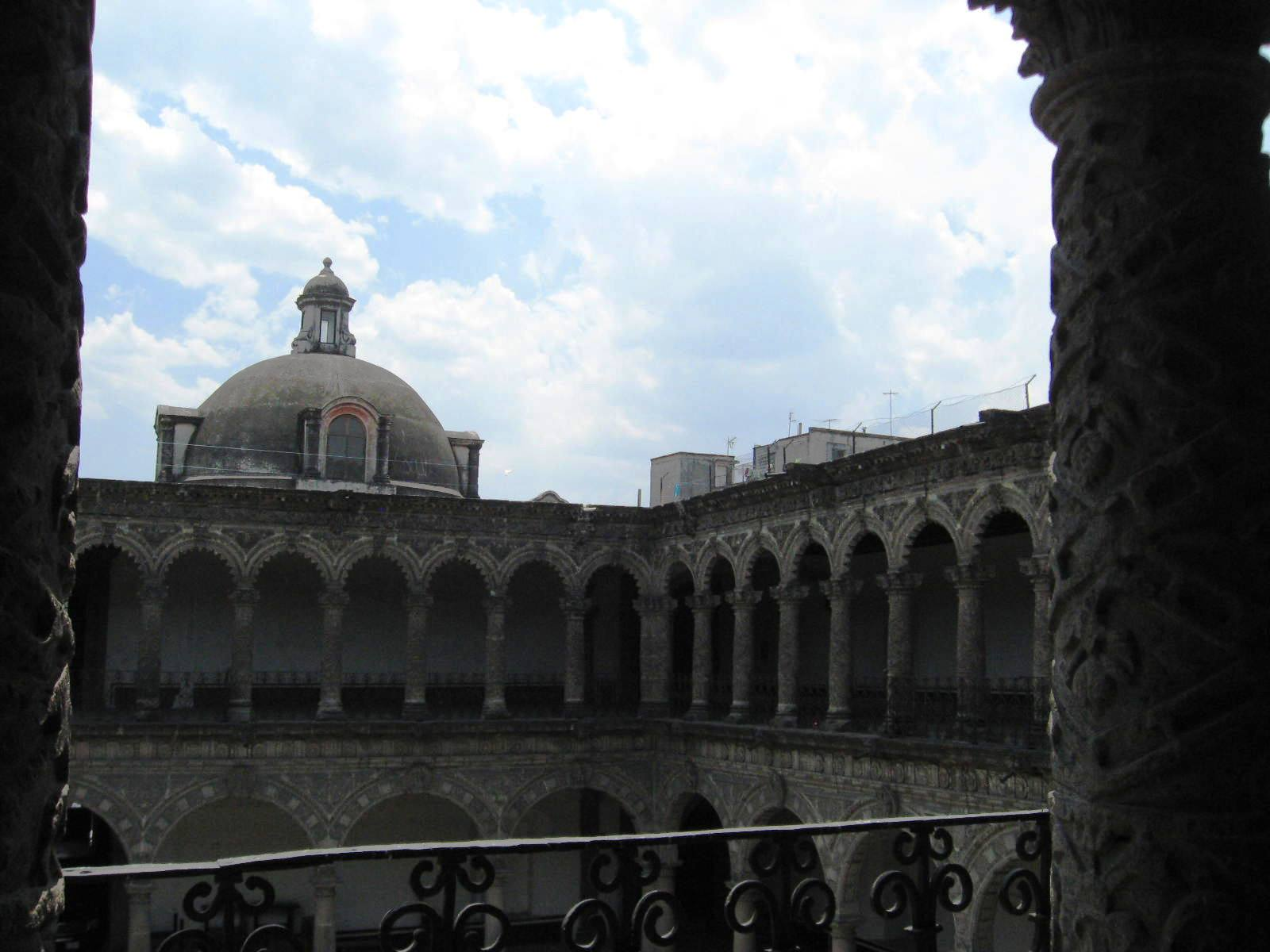
View of patio from behind columns of the upper floor of the remnant La Merced Cloister

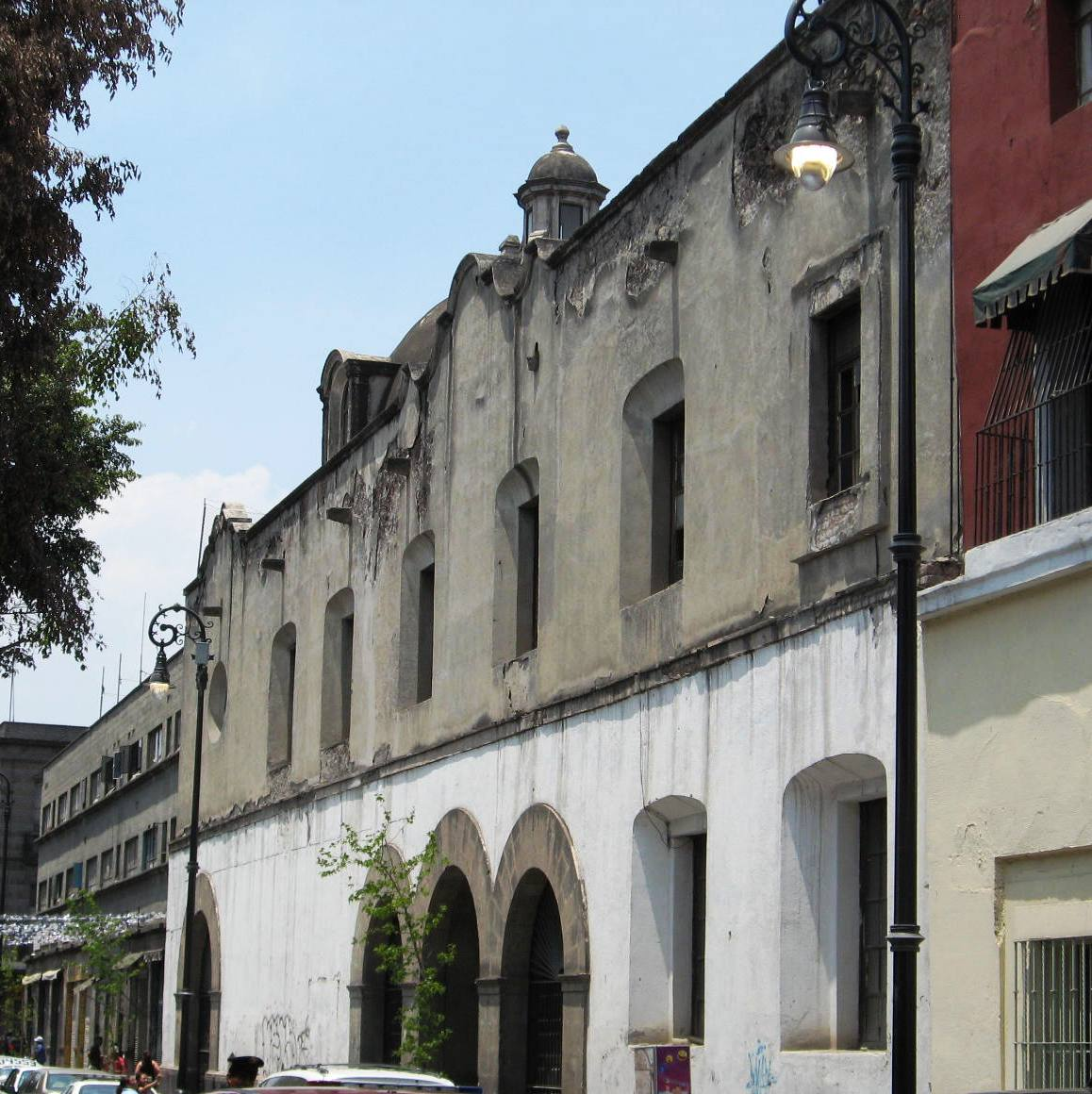
Side view

The Convent of Nuestra Señora de La Merced was a Roman Catholic colonial religious complex in present-day Historic center of Mexico City, that was destroyed to give more space to future buildings. The cloister is all that is left of a monastery complex built in the late 16th and early 17th century by the Mercedarian order. It is located on Uruguay and Talavera Streets in the historic downtown of Mexico City. The complex lent its name to the area around it, La Merced, which in turn, inspired the name of the metro station and the well-known neighborhood Market.

== History ==
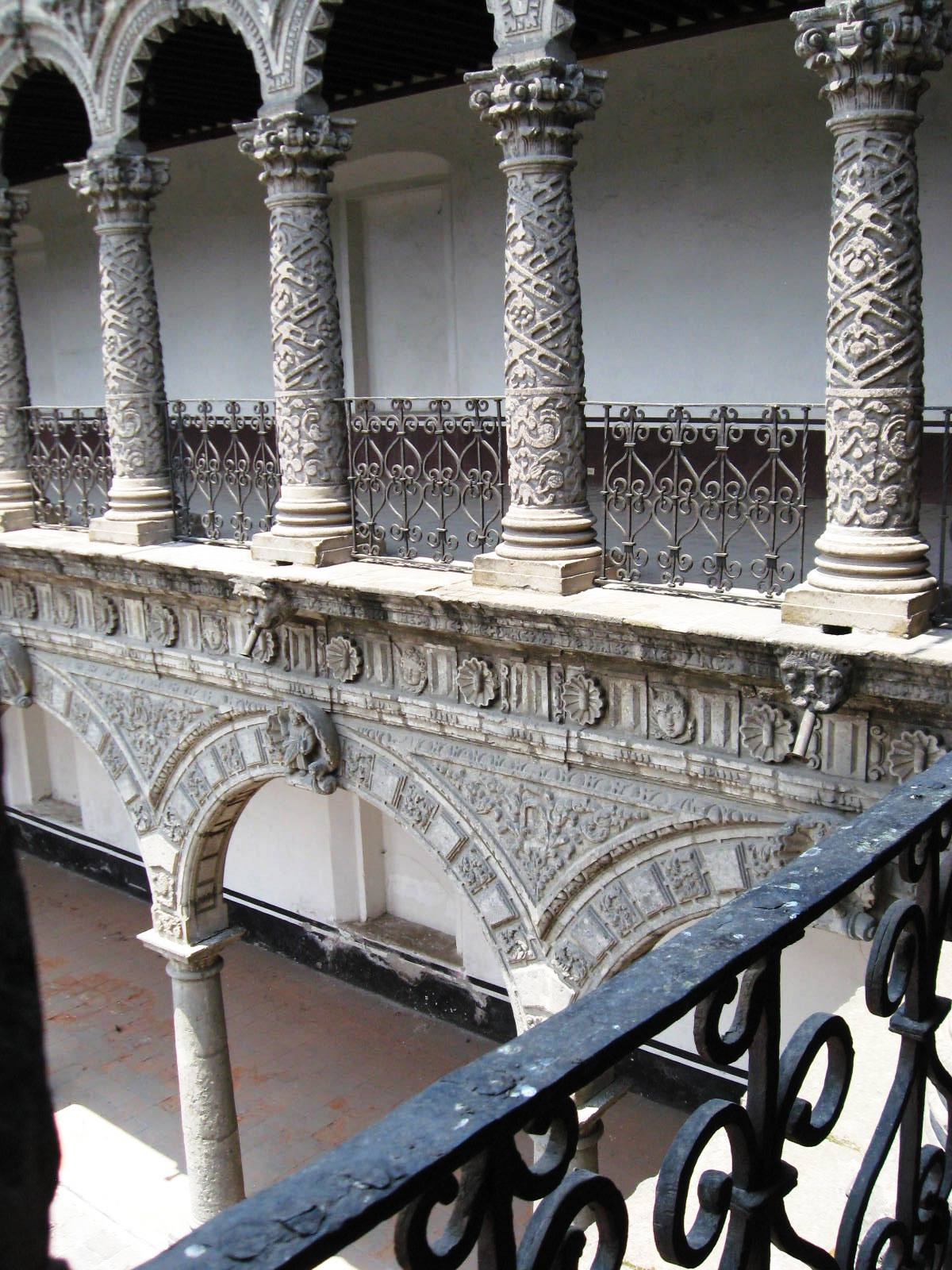
Corner view showing the doubling of columns from lower to upper floor

The Order of Mercedarians came to Mexico in 1593. Before establishing missions and churches in other parts of Mexico, the La Merced Monastery was established between the 16th and 17th centuries in Mexico City. The complex was designed and constructed by Juan de Herrera. The first stage of monastery's construction was begun with its church, now gone, begun in 1594 and ended toward the mid 17th century. The second stage, consisting mostly of the upper floor, was consecrated in 1703.

Due to the Reform Laws, the church and other parts of this monastery were destroyed in 1862, leaving only the one cloister that remains to this day. The only documentation of how the monastery looked before is preserved in an 1842 painting of the complex by Pedro Gualdi. The first post-Reform use of the building was as a military barracks, resulting in the destruction of the west facade and the heavy modification of the southern one. In later years, the cloister would serve as a gymnasium, school, museum, child care center and INBA (National Fine Arts Institute) tapestry workshop.

One reason this building has managed to survive to the present day is that it was the home and studio of artist Dr. Atl in the 1920s. When he moved in, it was in very poor condition, forcing him to live on the building's roof. Later, he restored the patio area, reconstructed the back part of the building and replaced the balustrades of the upper floor. From 1927 to the 1930s this was the location of the Escuela Nacional de Pintura, Escultura y Grabado.

== Description ==
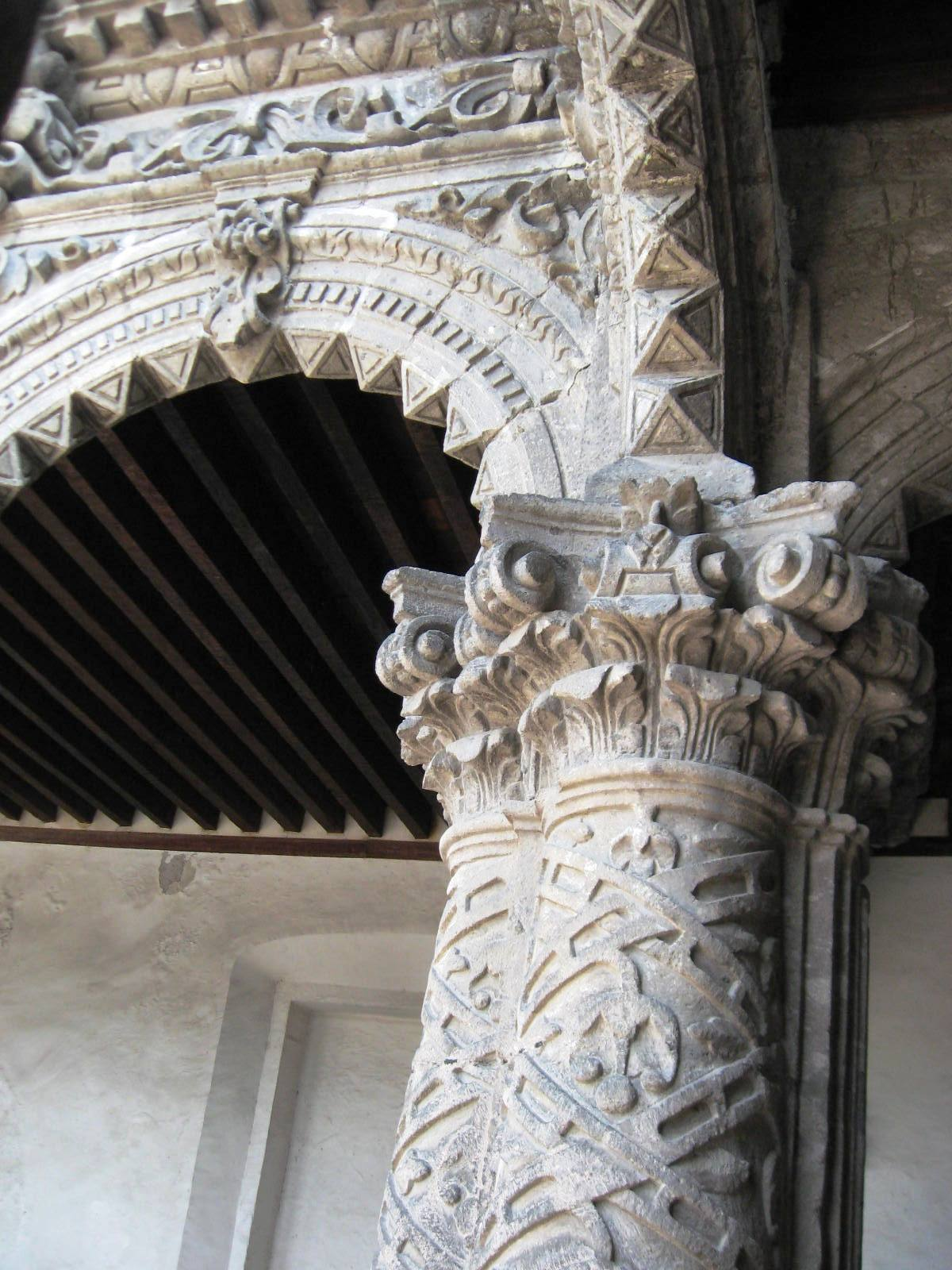
Closeup of corner column on upper floor

The cloister is noted for its mix of Baroque and Mudéjar elements, and has been called one of the most beautiful monasteries built in Mexico because of its elaborate decoration. In the middle is a patio, surrounded by two floors of columns with arches, behind which are walkways. A large staircase leads to the upper floor and tower next to the street. On each of the four sides of the patio, the seven ground-floor columns divide into fourteen upper-floor columns. The ground-floor columns are of Doric style and the keystones of each of the arches bear medallions with images of apostles or Mercedarian friars. The columns of the upper floor, built later, have more decoration than the lower. These columns are decorated with lattices intertwined with foliage and fruit. The spaces between the pilasters are decorated in Baroque style, with sculpted images of Mercedarian friars in the triangles that extend from the arches to the ceiling. On the undersides of the arches, small pyramids point downwards.

== See also ==
- List of colonial churches in Mexico City
