= La Merced (neighborhood) =

Human settlement in Mexico

Coordinates: 19°25′36.24″N 99°7′31.56″W

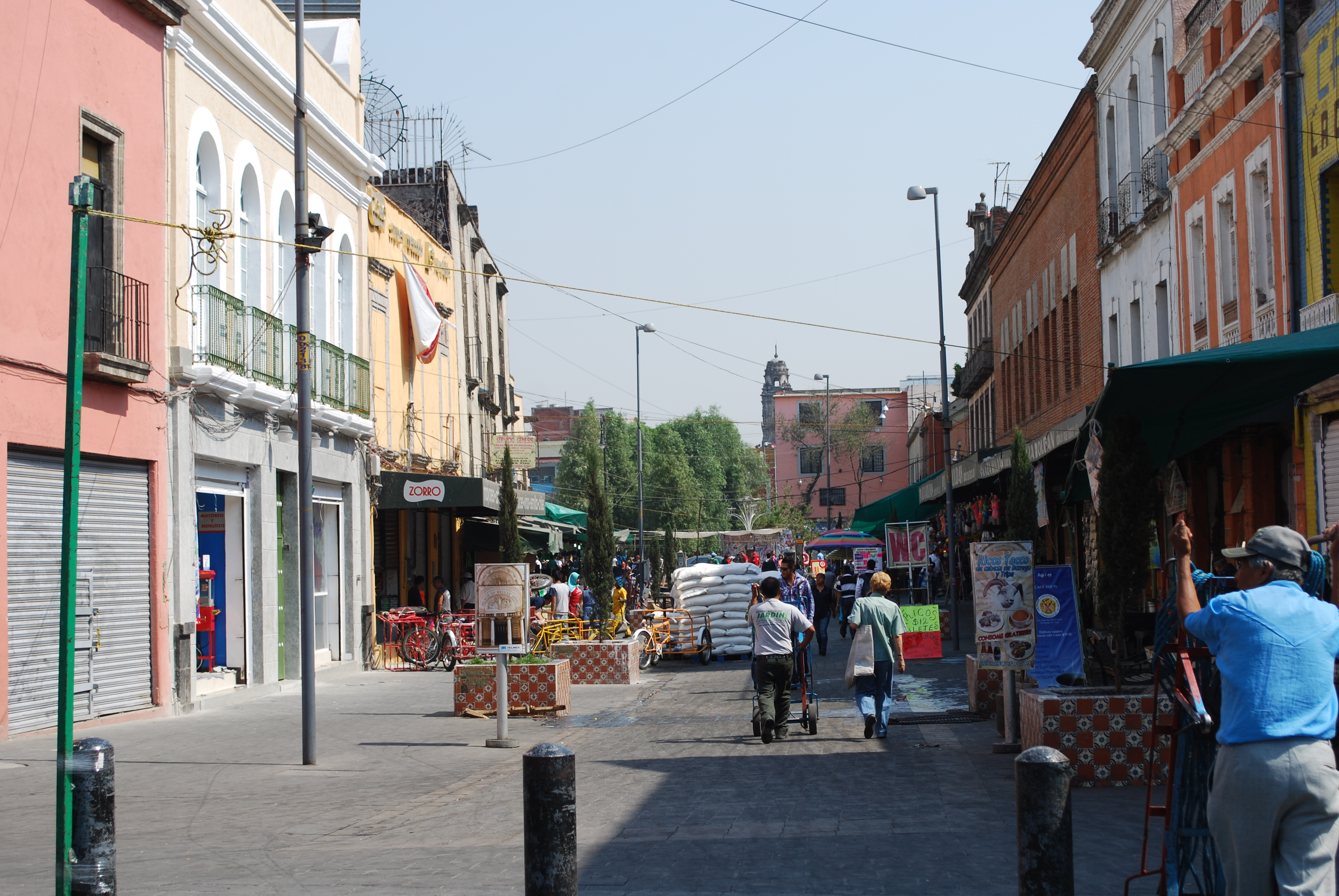
Calle Roldán, today a pedestrian zone

La Merced is a barrio or a neighborhood of Mexico City defined by its socioeconomics and history rather than by an official designation. It extends over the southeast of the historic center of Mexico City and is one of the oldest sections of the city, established over 700 years ago by the Mexica as part of the founding of Tenochtitlan. Over its history the area was associated with commerce, first as a major docking area for boats bringing goods to Tenochtitlan/Mexico City on Lake Texcoco, later via canals as the lake was slowly drained. In the latter 19th century, the La Merced market was established in the area replacing the massive La Merced monastery which was almost completely destroyed in the 1860s. This market was established to centralize the marketing of foodstuffs for the city on one area. The first La Merced market was built in 1890 and then replaced by the current building in 1957, one of the largest traditional Mexican markets in Mexico City. In the 1980s, the wholesale function of this market was taken over by the newly constructed Centro de Abasto in the south of the city, with the barrio then going into economic and social decline, with the area having problems with poverty, prostitution and population loss. Although there have been efforts to revitalize the area and the La Merced market remains important.

== Geography ==
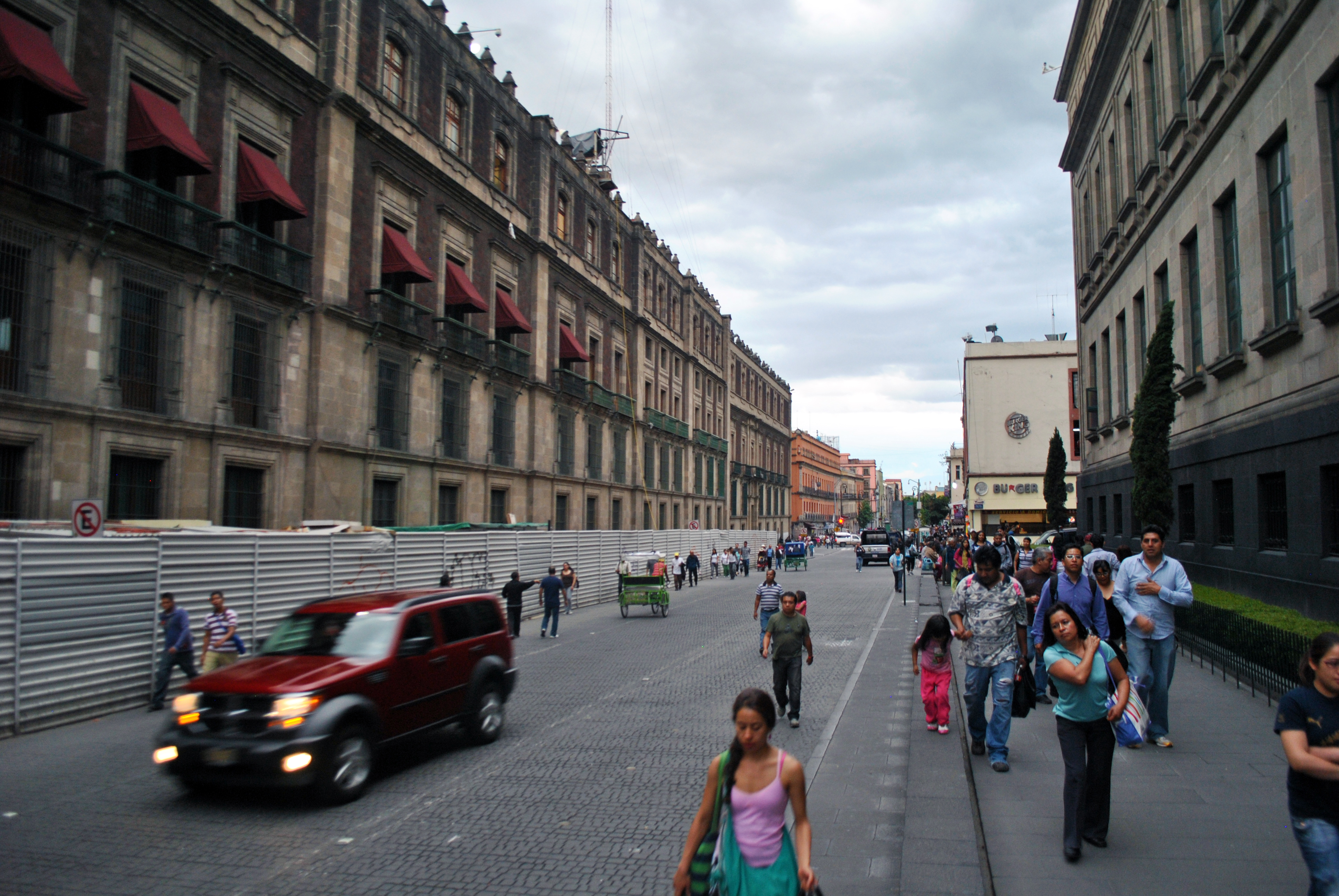
Corregidora Street near the Zocalo, entering the barrio

La Merced is a "barrio" an unofficial city division, located in the southeast corner of the historic center of Mexico City. Although somewhat fluid, its borders are generally considered to be formed by the streets of Corregiadora, Zavala and Candelaria in the north, Fray Servando Teresa de Mier in the south, Congreso de la Unión to the east and José María Pino Suárez to the west. It covers a territory of 106 city blocks or 121 hectares, accounting for about thirteen and a half percent of the city's historic center. It is part of the declared World Heritage site, with about forty percent of the area's historic buildings.

Officially, the area is divided among two of the boroughs of the Federal District of Mexico City, Cuauhtémoc and Venustiano Carranza. In addition, it is divided into "colonias" or official neighborhoods called Merced Balbuena (in Venustiano Carranza) and Colonia Centro (in Cuauhtémoc).

The neighborhood is defined by both its history and its social structure with most of formerly occupied by the massive La Merced monastery complex. The neighborhood is divided into three zones. The "antigua" (old) section is the largest with 97 blocks and corresponds to the lands of the La Merced monastery and the first La Merced market. It is defined by the streets of San Pablo to the south, Corregiadora to the north, Circunvalación to the east and José María Pino Suárez to the west. Here the population is more stable although it has suffered a loss of population like the rest of the historic center. Its businesses have shifted from retail outlets to warehouses with the exception of the westernmost section. The western section is almost entirely commercial with few residences. This area also has the largest number of street vendors.

The San Pablo section was the former Teopan shrine. It is bordered by Fray Servando Teresa de Mier to the south, San Pablo to the north, Circunvalacion to the east and Pino Suárez to the west. It itself subdivides into two areas. The southeast dominated by the San Lucas plaza and the other by two churches called San Pablo el Viejo and San Pablo el Joven. The last section is dominated by the current La Merced market, commonly referred to as "las naves" (the naves) and belongs to the Venustiano Carranza borough. This area subdivides into the market area devoted to produce, a residential area dominated by the Candelaria de los Patos apartment complex and another residential area along the Congreso de la Unión.

== Socioeconomics ==
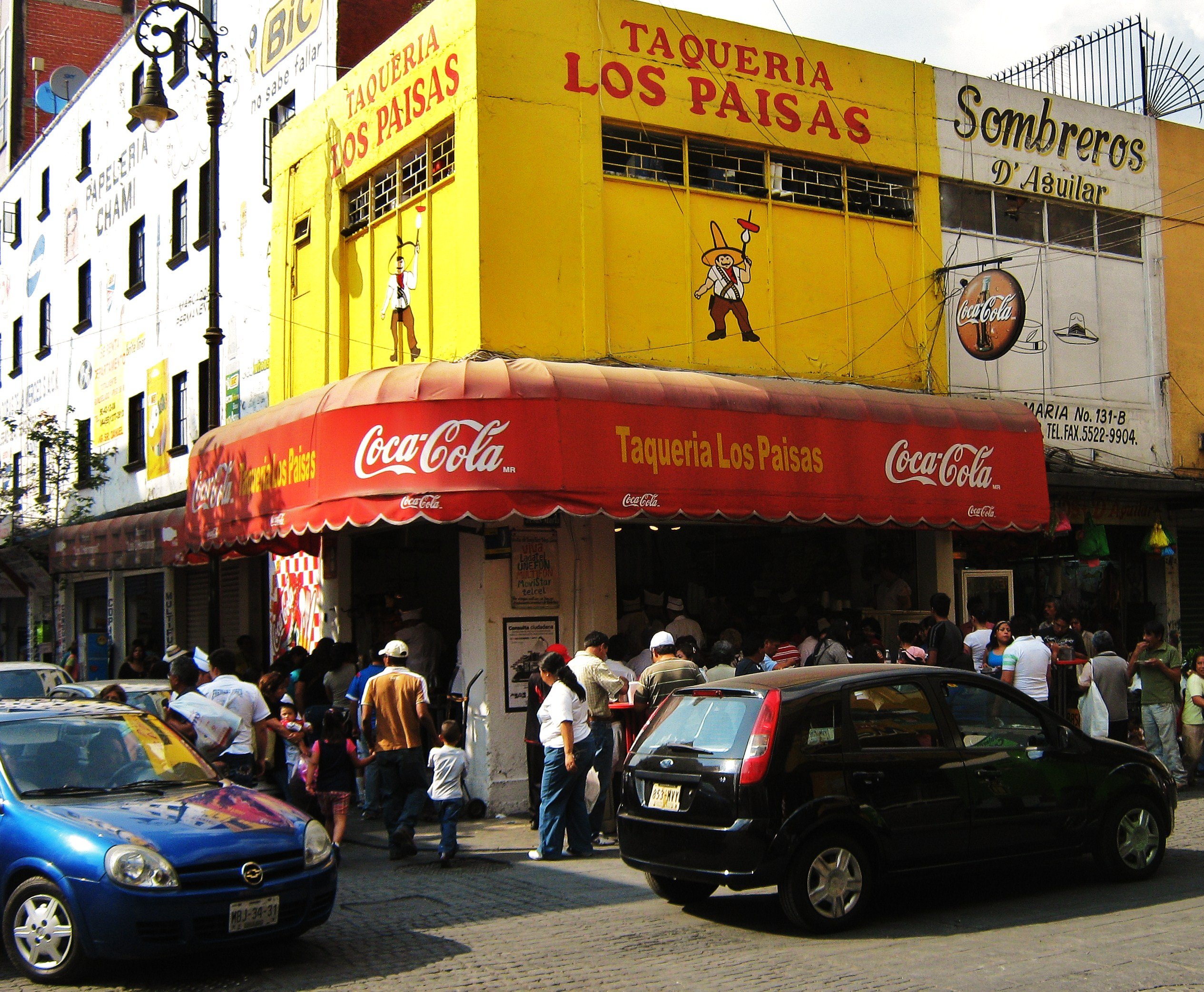
Businesses

The barrio has been mostly defined by both its socioeconomics and history, traditionally associated with retail and wholesale commerce, especially traditional Mexican foodstuffs. Its reliance on commerce done in families and influx of migrants has supported a notable social structure made up of social clusters within the barrio. As the area's commerce provided ready employment in the 20th century, the area attracted migrants from other areas of Mexico and from abroad. It has absorbed various Mexican indigenous peoples such as the Triquis, Mazahuas, Otomis, Mazatecos, Nahuas, Chinantecos and Purépechas. Foreign immigration has included Lebanese, Jewish, Spanish, Greek, Italian, Turkish, French, Syrian, Irish, Hungarian, Polish, Russian, African, German, Croatian, Bohemian, and Armenian from Europe, Chinese, Japanese, Filipinos, and Indians from Asia as well as immigrants from Africa and the Middle East. One notable establishment related to immigration in the area is Café Bagdad, which is popular among the Lebanese population, which comes to drink Middle Eastern style coffee. It is famous for its antique cash register as well as its coffee and pastries. The area remains multicultural although Catholic religious festivals still dominate.

Despite being part of the historic center of Mexico City and a World Heritage Site, the area is marginalized and poor, lacking the cultural amenities found in other parts of the historic center. Its socioeconomic marginalization is a result of various disruptions such as population movement and modernization efforts that included dividing the area politically and through the construction of large thoroughfares. This history has made residents skeptical of government interventions. Depopulation of the areas since the 1980s has limited residential areas west of the La Aguilita Plaza, which has acted as a barrier to commercial growth to the west side. This area has problems with squatting, prostitution, robbery, the establishment of strip clubs and corruption. Many of the buildings were traditionally of mixed use being residence, storage and commercial, with commercial uses on the lower floors and residential uses for the upper. The depopulation has led to many building with empty upper floors despite the fact that the city overall has a housing shortage.

The most visible of the area's ills is prostitution, being one of Mexico City's seven red-light districts where the practice is tolerated by authorities. The tolerance has led to problems with the trafficking of women . Lines of prostitutes can be seen even in the daytime. The estimated number in the area vary between 800 and 1,200, with most seen on Fridays, Saturdays and traditional paydays. Most perform their services in one of four hotels. About forty percent are from Puebla and Tlaxcala, thirty percent from Oaxaca, twenty percent from Veracruz, Chiapas, Hidalgo and Tabasco, with the rest from Mexico City, the State of Mexico and Morelos.

The Brigada Callejera (Streetwalker Brigade) is a civil organization founded in 1983 to protect the human rights of prostitutes, and well as of transgender people and people with HIV/AIDS. The organization states that most prostitutes begin as minors and in 2008 prompted the city to crack down on hotels in La Merced and Buenavista where sexual exploitation of women and girls was worst. However, the problem persists.

== Legends and stories ==
In addition to a long history, the area is home to many legends and ghost stories. These include that of Esperanza Goyeneche de Ruiz Garica whose ghost is said to appear in narrow alleys. One related to the old Merced church states that the priest once caught a thief there. The priest then cut off the thief's hand and displayed it in the church to deter others. A reference to this story can be seen with the representation of a hand at the entrance of a house facing the Plaza Alonso Garcia Bravo. In the 1980s a rumor began about a fifty-kilo rat blamed for the disappearance of domestic cats and dogs. Although proof was never found, many people still believe the story, said to have gotten to that size eating the mounds of garbage produced by the La Merced market.

== Landmarks ==
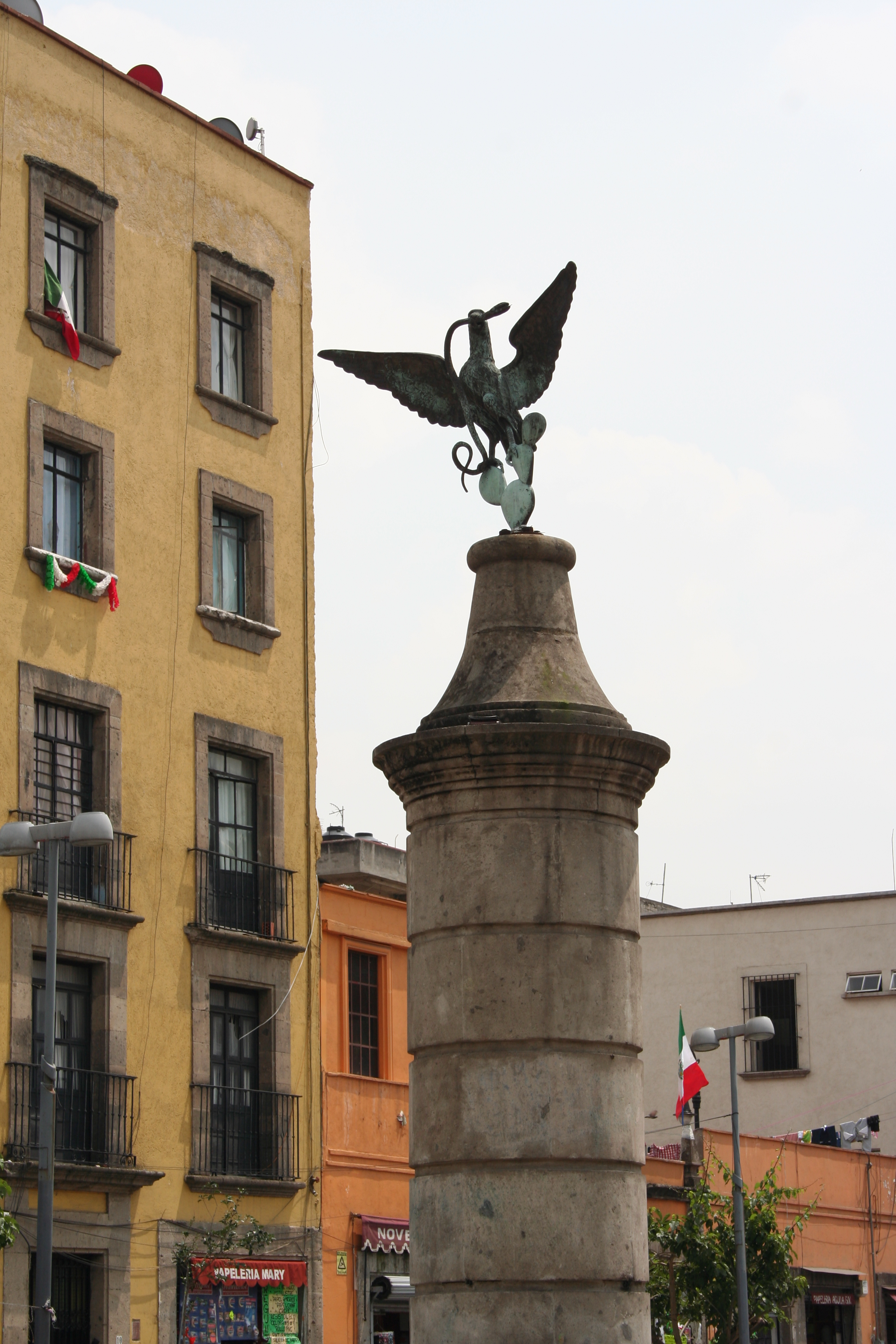
Plaza de la Aguilita

With a few exceptions, buildings have not been preserved for their historic value but rather used for commercial purposes. There are seventeen historic sites declared with the World Heritage Site declaration in 1980, 39 declared such by INAH and 33 more contained in other catalogs. The most important of these is the cloister of the La Merced monastery, the parish of La Soledad, the church and former convent of Jesús María, the former monastery of San Gerónimo, the Candelaria chapel, the parishes of Santo Tomás de la Palma, San Pablo el Viejo and San Pablo en Nuevo, the San Luca chapel, the monastery hospital of San Camilo, the San José de Gracia church, the Hospital San Lázaro, the Palace of the Counts of Calimaya and the Casa Talavera. Other historic landmarks include the Casa de las Gallas, the Casa de Calpixques, the former Garita de San Lázaro and the Casa de Diezmo. Thirty nine of these buildings are at high risk of being lost.

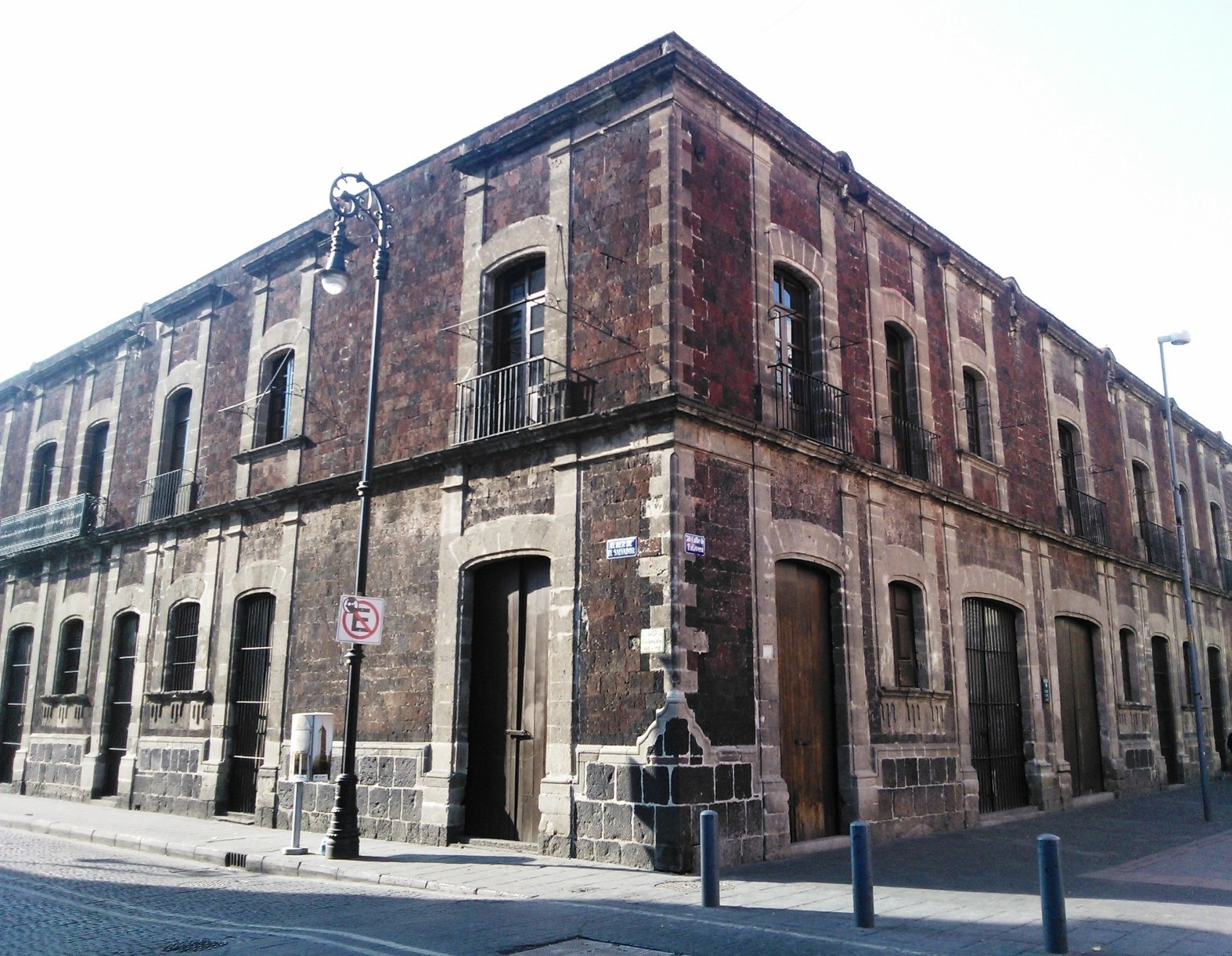
Casa Talavera

The best known landmark of the barrio is not historic but rather commercial, a massive traditional market of the same name, La Merced . Located in the barrio's heart, between Anillo de Circunvalacion and Morazán streets, this market is one of the largest of its kind in Latin America. With the main structure 400 meters long and containing over 3,000 stalls, with its own Metro station inside. In its earlier history, it was not only the wholesale market for the city but one of the main ones for the country. The Nave Mayor sells produce and the Nave Menor sells meat, fish, dairy, packaged groceries and cold cuts. A section called the "desnivel" (not-level) has a variety of food stalls. There is also an area dedicated to handcrafts, tools/utensils and toys and annexes dedicated to fresh and artificial flowers and plants as well as one dedicated to candy. While still a large and important market, at its height it supported hundreds human carriers called mecalapers, watchmen, baggers and warehousers, trades such as carpentry, tailoring and glassworking and other businesses such as restaurants, lodging, cantinas and bars specializing in pulque.

The origin of the barrio's name really comes from a monastery built at the end of the 16th century called Nuestra Señora de la Merced de la Redención de los Cautivos (Monastery of Our Lady of Grace of the Redemption of Captives), the only major Mercedarian establishment in New Spain . All that remains of a complex that extended over most of what is now the modern barrio is a small cloister near the Plaza Alonso García Bravo, noted for its highly elaborate relief work.

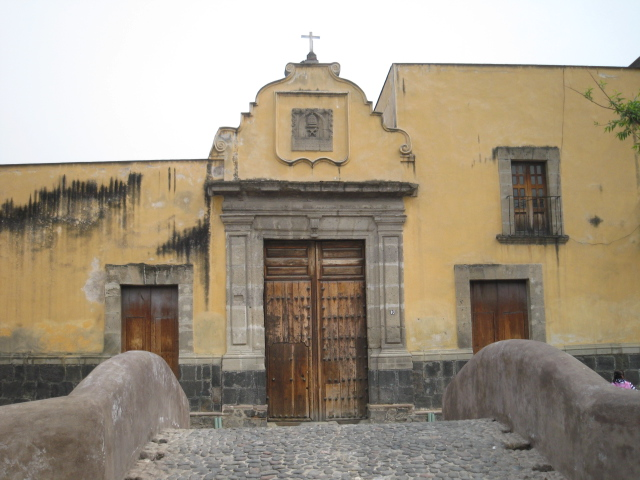
Casa de Diezmo of La Merced

Another major colonial religious institution was the Jesús María convent, which was founded in the 16th century for upper-class Spanish women. It was home to the illegitimate daughter of Philip II of Spain. Only the main patio of the convent and its accompanying church remain. The convent building was home to a furniture store and a cinema but today it is abandoned and being rehabilitated by INAH.

One notable area in the barrio is Talavera Street near the La Merced Market. Today that street is for pedestrians only, dominated by an altar dedicated to the Santo Niño de Atocha. This altar commemorates the area's traditional commerce in items for Child Jesus figures in Mexico, especially clothes for rites related to Candlemas. Today it is also noted for selling clothing for people as well. At the intersection of Talavera and El Salvador there is a large former mansion from the 18th century. Its facade is of red tezontle with simple ornamentations. This is called the Casa Talavera which is today a cultural center. Its name comes from the fact that it was the first producer of Talavera pottery in Mexico. It was the property of the marquis of San Miguel de Aguayo. Next to this structure is a square called the Plaza Aguilita (little eagle) or Plaza Juan José Baz. In its center, there is a fountain with a figure of an eagle on a nopal cactus with a snake in its mouth, as this spot, according to tradition, is where the Mexica saw this sign, telling them to settle here.

The Plaza Alonso Garcia Bravo is home to a permanent tianguis, with carps blocking the view of the fountain and the monument to the Spaniard responsible for outlay of modern Mexico City after the Conquest. On the north side of the plaza, there is number of notable buildings. One of these has a highly decorated niche with an image of Apostle James the Great. At the top of the niche there is an image of a hand, which refers to the legend of the thief. Another of the buildings dates from between 1870 and 1906 with three levels in Neo classical style and the one next to that is distinguished by three large arches on its facade. These buildings have the names of the architects and stone workers engraved on their walls. One other building is distinguished by a series of winged fishes that appear inside niches.

The Parish of Santo Tomás La Palma has a Baroque portal made of sandstone which features a Christ on the cross in relief. It has a wide one level bell tower which extends up from the center. Inside, the vaults have paintings and the main altar has an image of Saint Thomas touching the wound on Christ's side. The cupola has angel decoration with an image of Juan Diego with the Virgin of Guadalupe. Another notable feature is the arch of the doorway leading to the sacristy.

The Casa del Diezmo or Alhóndiga, is from the 16th century. What remain is the façade of the building with a small bridge in front as a reminder of the canal that used to pass in front of it. Its original function was to collect the ten-percent tithe for the church from all commercial activity in the city.

Manzanares Street is home to the Manzanares Church, considered to be the smallest in Mexico City. Off one of its alleys, there is a large home from the 16th century which is the only one owned by an indigenous person from the era still standing.

== History ==
=== Pre Hispanic period ===
The La Merced area is one of the oldest parts of Mexico City, settled by the Mexica over 700 years ago, known as Tempan or Teopan. Tradition states that here is where the Mexica saw the sign from the god Huitzilopochtli to end their wanderings, with the first temple to that god built on what was then a small island in Lake Texcoco. As the city of Tenochtitlan grew, this area became the southeast corner of the city, known as Tempan or Teopan. Even though the temple to Huitzilopochtli was moved, the area remained important with a shrine to Ehécatl, the Casa de Pajaros and a brewery that produced pulque for the royal palace.

=== Colonial period ===
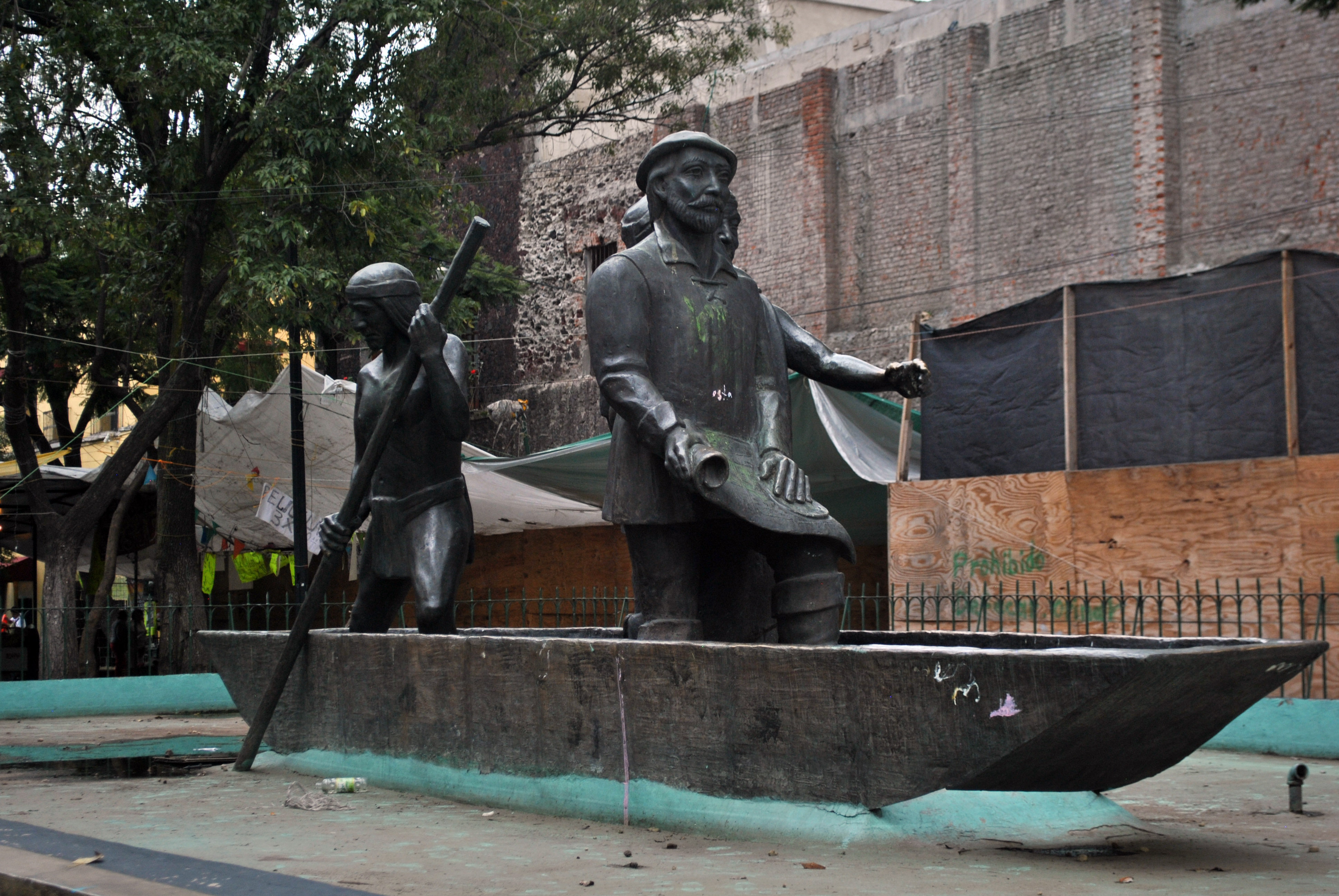
Plaza Alonso Garcia Bravo

After the conquest of the Aztec Empire by the Spanish, the city of Tenochtitlan was reconfigured but the new layout did not affect this area of the city that much because it was criss-crossed by various canals and chinampas or artificial extensions of land. At first the only changes were the expansion of plazas and the construction of bridges wide enough to allow the passage of horses and carriages. Political changes to the area began early with the territory divided into three parts: Parcialidad de San Pablo, Cuartel and Colonia Centro.

Although the barrio's name of La Merced is associated with the modern market, the area is really named after the La Merced monastery . However, the area's association with commerce began early in the colonial period. Despite the beginning of projects to drain Lake Texcoco, canals were an important means of getting goods from other parts of the Valley of Mexico into Mexico City, much of which arrived to this barrio by this means until the early 20th century. During the colonial period, the main grain market was here as was the building where the Church collected its tithe, the Alhóngida Casa del Diezmo as well as two of the largest and richest monasteries of the time, Jesús María and La Merced and various mansions including that of the Marquis de Aguayo which is now called the Casa Talavera.

The Parcialidad de San Pablo-Teopan remained an important area of the city with government buildings and churches and other important structures. Ones that remain in whole or in part include the former monastery of La Merced, the convent of Jesús María, Manzanares, Santo Tómas La Palma, San Pablo el Viego, San Lucas, San Ramón, Balvanera, San José de Gracias, Porta Coeli, La Soledad, La Santa Cruz (La Candelaria, Santa María Magdalena, San Lázaro, San Camilo, the first Casa de Correos, the Casa de Diezmo, Casa de Cuna (Niños Expósitos), Casa de la Gallas, La Alhóndiga and the Garita de San Lázaro.

While the La Merced area was one of the main reception areas for the city in the colonial period, initially, the main markets were in and around the main square or Zocalo. Mostly these were noisy and dirty open air markets called tianguis. At various points in its history, the city has tried to reorder and modernize wholesale and retail sales. In 1791, the Mercado de Volador market was constructed on a site just off the Zocalo, where the Supreme Court now stands.

=== Post Independence ===
However, by the latter 1800s, this market had become overcrowded. In the 1860s, the Reform Laws expropriated the monastery and much of it was destroyed. The merchants from Volador were relocated to this area. This movement changed the Merced neighborhood to its current commercial character.

The most important change to the area was the expropriation of the lands of the La Merced monastery (most of the current barrio) to be demolished to construct commercial and residential spaces. In the 1860s, this vast monastery complex, which covered most of the barrio's current extension was almost entirely demolished as part of efforts to modernize the historic center of Mexico City. In 1890, the first La Merced Market was constructed to concentrate the commerce of foodstuffs on one area and modernize the informal markets which already existed along the canal docks. This effort coincided with the national business interests as well as foreign investors in Mexico and prompted the development of services such as electricity, running water, telegraph and transport options such as trains, trolleys and automobiles.

=== 20th century to the present ===
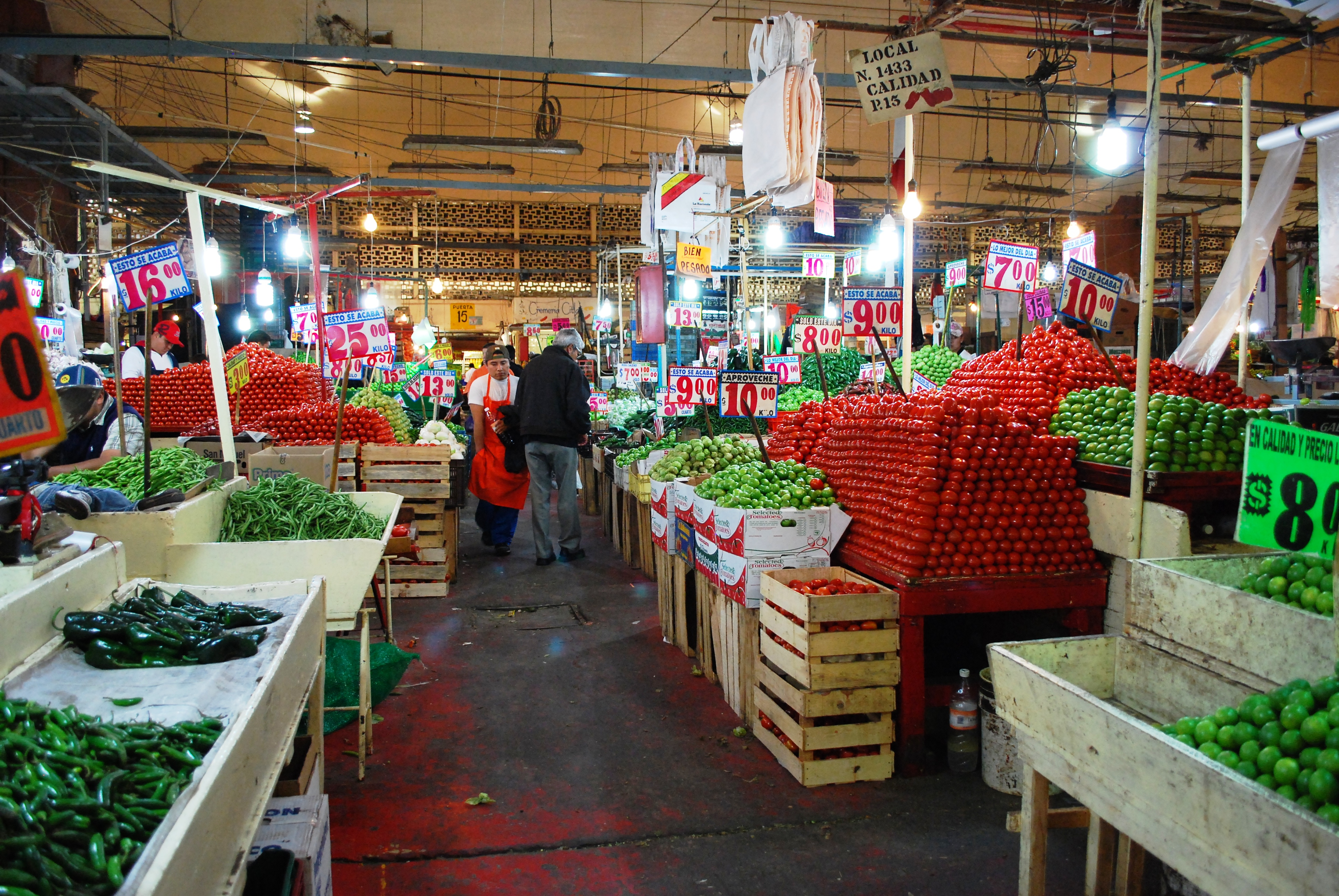
View inside part of the market

At the beginning of the 20th century, the barrio was politically split with the reorganization of the Federal District. The west portion became part of the Cuauhtémoc borough and the east part of the Venustiano borough. The outbreak of the Mexican Revolution caused a decline in the area's commerce, but this recovered slowly after the fighting ended, returning to former levels by the 1950s. During this decade, it became the most important wholesale food market in Mexico City, prompting the building of new business and services such as hotels, taxis, bus terminals and public restrooms.

This recovery of the commerce in the first half of the 20th century attracted migration into the barrio both from within Mexico and from abroad, especially from the 1930s and 1950s. Migrants from Mexico were from rural areas and included various indigenous groups. Foreign immigrant groups were mostly Arab, Lebanese and Jewish groups, as well as Armenians, Greeks, Spanish, French, Italians, and Hungarians among other groups were also present in the neighbourhood. Almost all became involved in commerce as workers and as business owners. Immigrants diversified the commerce of the area, expanding into household items, handcrafts, fabric, paper goods and clothing.

In the 1950s, new modernization efforts were begun by Mexico City mayor Ernesto P. Uruchurtu. Old tenements in the area were replaced by large apartment buildings, especially in the La Candelaria de los Patos and La Soledad areas. Main thoroughfares were constructed and widened such as Anillo de Circunvalación, Pino Suárez, Fray Servando Teresa de Mier and San Pablo. However, the most iconic project was the replacement of the 19th century La Merced market with the current structure. This new building was designed by architect Enrique del Moral and opened in 1957, built next to the Anillo de Circunvalación.

From the 1960s to the early 1980s, the historic center of Mexico City continued to grow rapidly, becoming crowded. In the 1980s, the Mexico City government decided to promote development in the outer zones of the Federal District. New apartment construction was concentrated in areas such as Iztapalapa and the main inter-city bus station was closed, moving its function to four new stations (Central Norte, TAPO, Taxqueña and Poniente). However, the most important change was the construction of the Central de Abasto in Iztapalapa, taking over La Merced's role as the main wholesale food market for the city. Although, the area was included the construction of the first Metro line, the disruption of commerce and affordable housing disrupted La Merced's social structures as many families move out, following jobs and other resources in Iztapalapa. Those that remained behind faced problems with poverty, violent crime and the rise of prostitution. The deterioration was further reinforced due to the destruction caused by the 1985 Mexico City earthquake .

In the 1980s, the area, along with the rest of the historic center of the city, was declared a World Heritage Site which allowed for measures to preserve some of La Merced's historic buildings. However, the lack of clear guidelines and resources did not allow for full implementation of preservation efforts. The 1985 earthquake affected a part of the area including historic buildings. However most reconstruction efforts had to be centered on created new residences to replace those destroyed.

Since the 1980s, the population of the area has continued to decline, with areas becoming almost entirely commercial, with the introduction of new businesses such as paper goods stores after 1985, which took over former residential space such as the second and third floors of buildings. This change also prompted real estate speculation. Most of the population now is on the west side of the traditional area starting from the Aguilita plaza, which acts as a barrier to commercial growth into the western side.

Starting in the 2000s, there have been efforts to renovate areas of the barrio, to make it more attractive to tourists and other visitors. A number of streets such as Republic de El Salvador, Mesones, Roldán, Santo Tomas and Corregiadora have been converted into the "Alhóndiga-Talavera pedestrian corridor." The corridor has improvements in lighting, signs. A Metrobus line has been established through the area, and the Turibus goes through part of it. From 2009 and 2012,100 million pesos were invested in this pedestrian area as well as restoring the facades of a number of historic buildings, commercial spaces such as Roldán and the redesign of Plaza Alonso García Bravo.

== See also ==
- La Merced Market
