= Trujillo Botanical Garden =

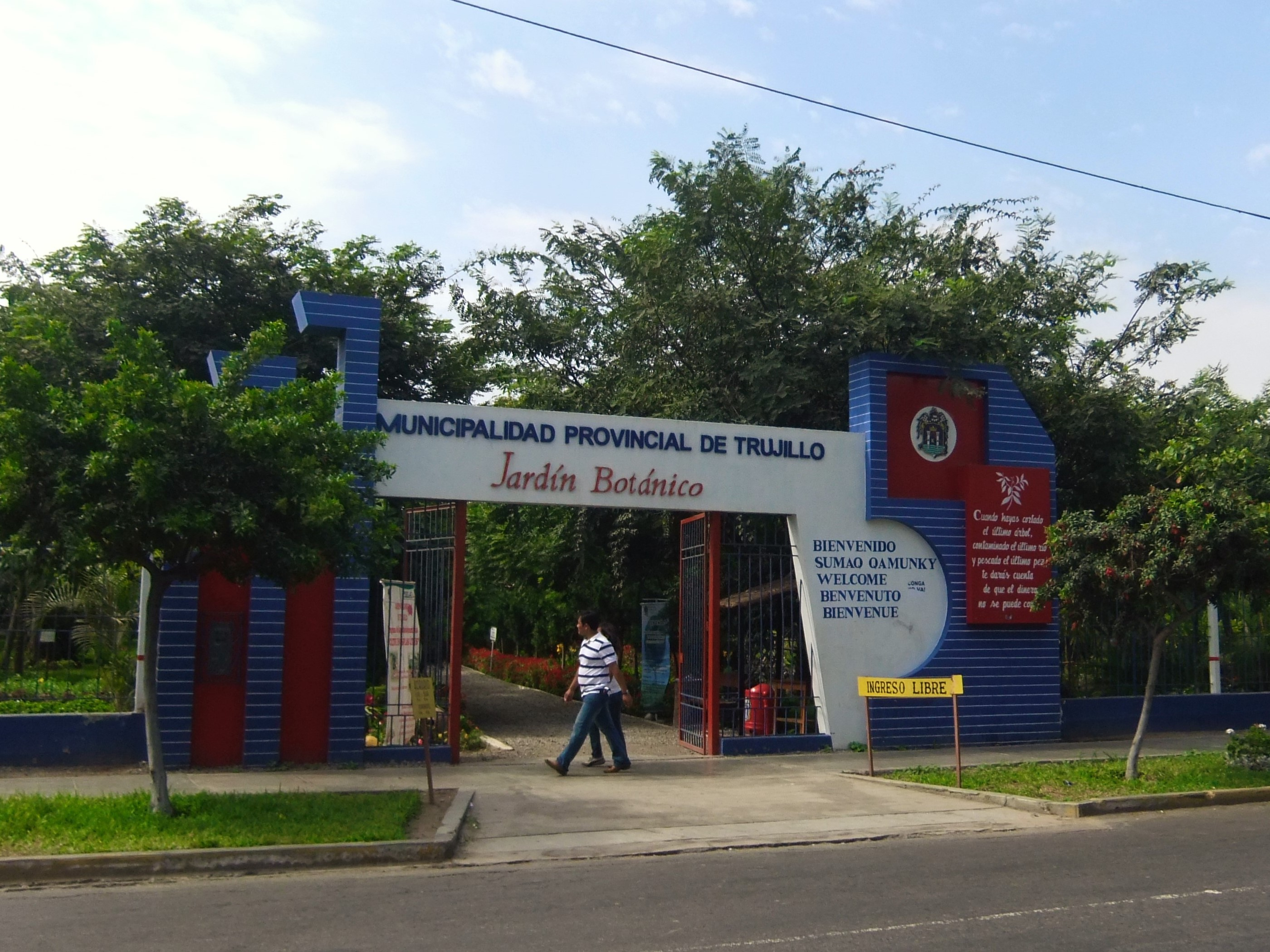
Main entrance to the Trujillo Botanical Garden

The Trujillo Botanical Garden (Jardín Botánico) is a botanical garden located in the city of Trujillo, Peru. It is located on America Sur Avenue, 1 mile (0.6 km) south of the main city square in La Merced neighborhood. The 6.5-acre (2.5 ha) garden contains 250 catalogued plant species, in addition to a number of unidentified plants among its collections.

The garden houses a number of endangered plants, as well as an ethnobotanical collection (which includes medicinal, ornamental, and crop plants native to the Americas).

A number of animals also reside in the grounds, such as peacocks, turtles, and parrots.

== History ==
Prior to 1993, the site where the garden currently stands was fallow land. During that year, neighborhood groups organized a clean-up campaign, and renamed the area as "Parque de la Cultura". It was then when the first trees were planted, such as Casuarina, Flamboyant trees, Eucalyptus, Acacias, and Figs. The acid soil on the grounds was another challenge, which the neighborhood groups tackled successfully.

But as the trees took hold and grew, they provided refuge for pickpockets and petty criminals. The lack of security and high crime incidence made the park infamous during the 1990s. As a result, the local government installed security fencing and lighting, reducing the problem. Year after year, more trees were planted by both volunteers and the local municipality. in 2003, the local neighborhood groups successfully lobbied for a name change of the park to Jardín Botánico. Currently it is one of the few verdant refuges in the city, popular with locals and visitors alike.
