= La Merced Market =

Traditional food market in Mexico City

Coordinates: 19°25′33.32″N 99°7′26.61″W

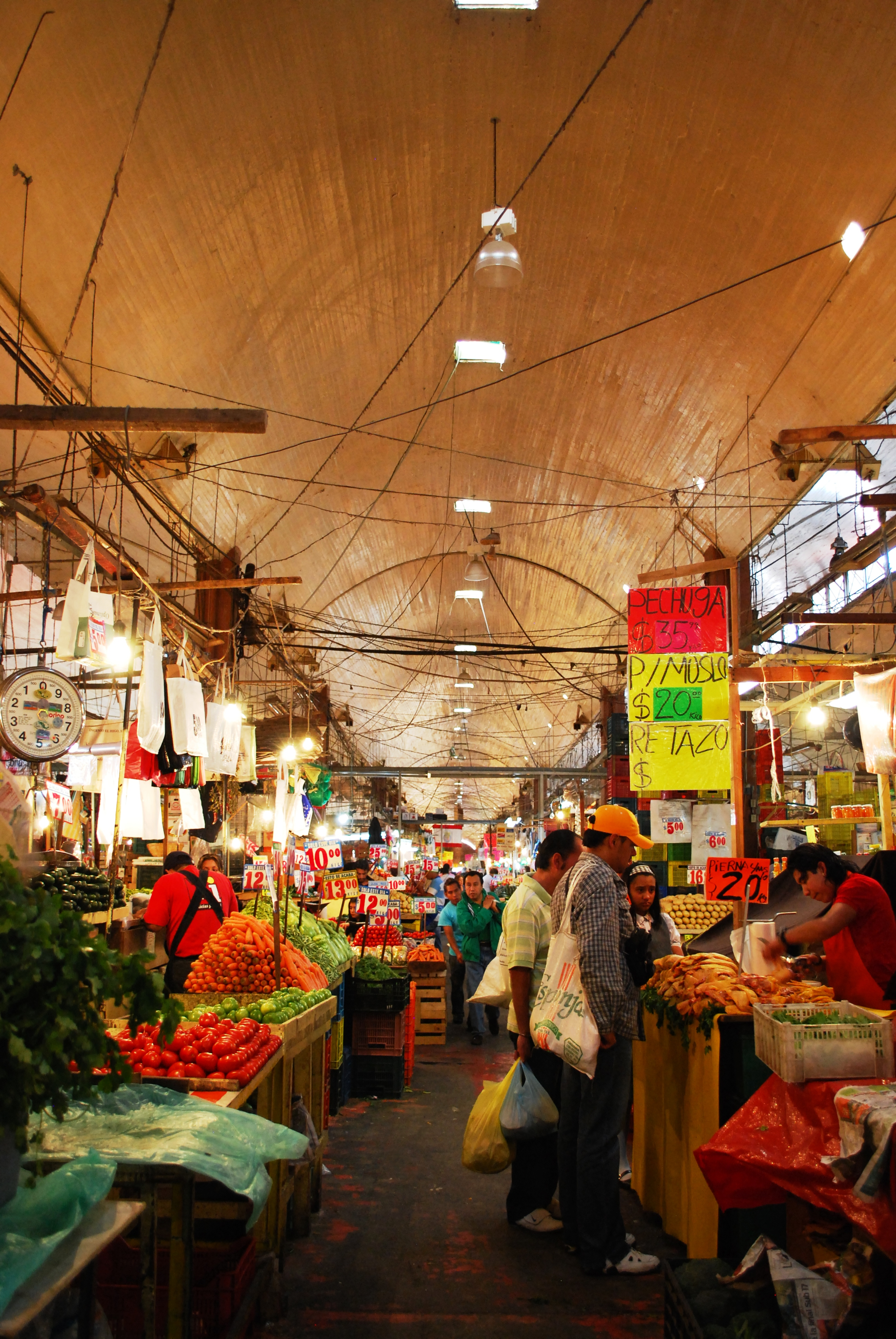
One section of the huge main hall

The La Merced Market is a traditional public market located in the eastern edge of the historic center of Mexico City and is the largest retail traditional food market in the entire city. The area, also called La Merced, has been synonymous with commercial activity since the early colonial period when traders arrived here from other parts of New Spain. At one time, nearly the entire neighborhood was filled with market stalls and in the 1860s it was decided to build a permanent market on the grounds of the old La Merced monastery. In the first half of the 20th century, this market was the major wholesaler for the entire city. This ended when the Central de Abasto was opened in the 1980s, but La Merced remains the largest traditional retail market. The market area is also known for flagrant prostitution in which women can be seen soliciting at all hours of the day and night. It is estimated that about one third of these prostitutes are underage.

== Location ==
La Merced is located east of the main plaza or Zócalo in several very large buildings, and is the city's largest traditional retail market. Metro La Merced has openings both just outside the market and inside one of the buildings. Outside the buildings, the unofficial market or “tianguis” continues on the sidewalks and streets between this market and the Zocalo. This kind of commerce is illegal, but laws against it are only intermittently enforced as unemployment is high, and peddlers pay bribes to local bosses who in turn pay bribes to local officials. This means that both inside and outside the market, pedestrian traffic jams are frequent. The market area also generates about 450 tons of trash daily.

== History ==
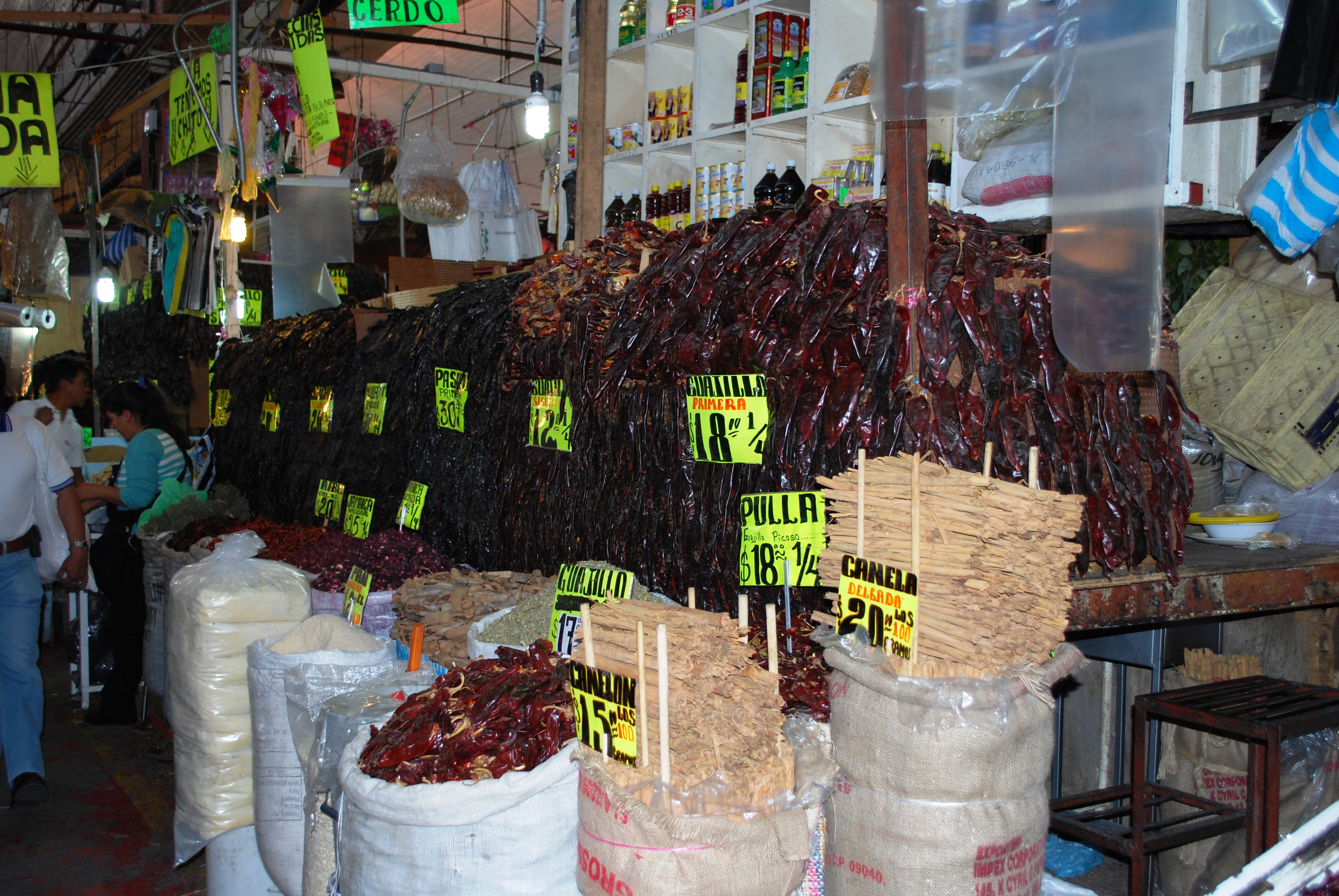
Stand selling a variety of dried chili peppers

The name La Merced is synonymous with commerce in the city. The market and neighborhood is located on the far eastern side of the original layout of Mexico City after the Conquest. Here many traders arrived with wares from near and far. The market is named after the neighborhood, La Merced, which in turn was named after the monastery Nuestra Señora de la Merced de Redención de Cautivos established in 1594 and simply called the monastery of La Merced. Most of this monastery has since disappeared, leaving only its cloister with its Plateresque decoration. The neighborhood is an old one, and stories and legends, such as the whispers of Doña Esperanza Goyeneche de Ruiz Garcia who died here. Another involves an indigenous chief who received money for being a spy for the Spaniards and was found out. It is said that when this happened, he sat still never moving until he died of sadness.

By the end of the 18th century, almost the entire neighborhood was one great market, which became bigger when the markets of the Zocalo area were banished around the same time. In the 19th century, the famous Circo Orrín with the first Mexican clown Ricardo Bell of Pachuca regularly stopped near this market.

In the 1860s, it was decided to put the market under a roof, and the buildings were constructed on the old monastery grounds. In 1863, the first permanent buildings were constructed. By the early 20th century La Merced was the major wholesale and retail market of Mexico City, especially for foodstuffs. It continued to be the wholesale market for the city during the post-Mexican Revolution period until about the 1960s. At that time, the Central de Abasto market was created in the south of the city to take over and modernize the wholesaling of foodstuffs, especially produce and meat. La Merced continues to be the largest retail traditional market of Mexico City for a wide variety of everyday products such as fruit, vegetables, meat, poultry, toys, clothes; flowers, candy and more.

In 1988, a fireworks stand in La Merced exploded, which killed more than 60 people. In 1998, a major fire destroyed two-thirds of the main hall of the market, along with 572 stalls selling dried chili peppers, fruit, vegetables, shoes and piñatas in the early morning of 4 May. No one was killed or injured and the cause was suspected to be faulty wiring. It took over 100 firemen more than three hours to get the fire under control.

== Inside the market ==
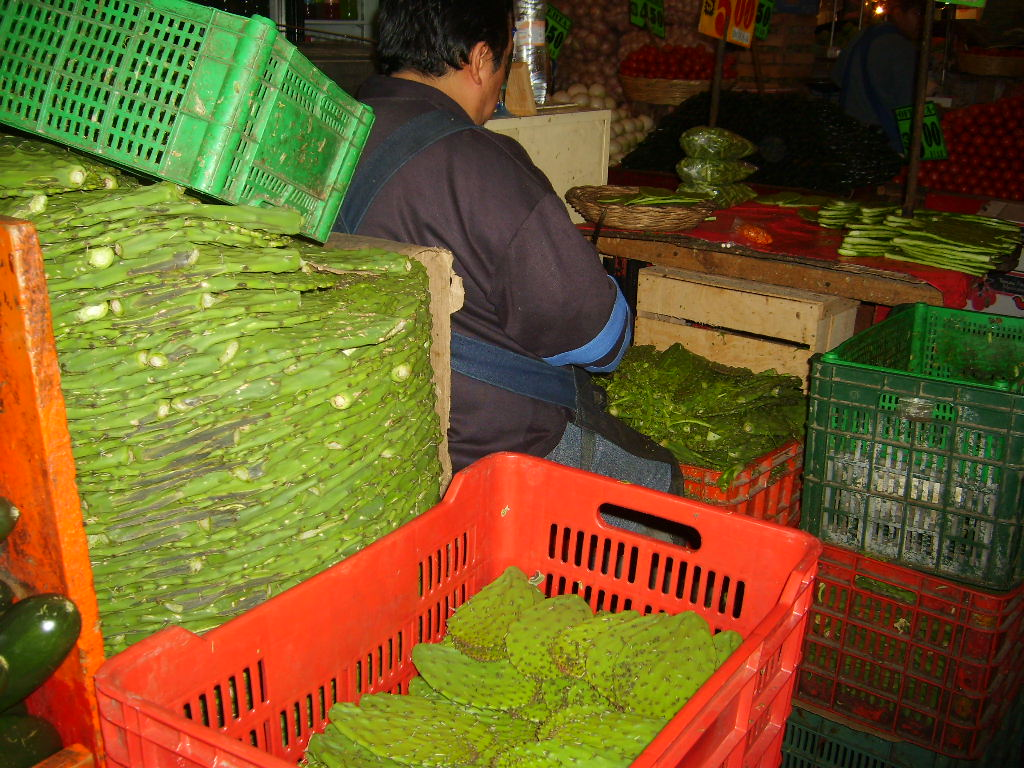
Nopals for sale at La Merced

The largest building of the complex is dedicated mostly to the sale of fruits and vegetables. Other buildings sell household items such as juicers, tinware, spoons, cleaning supplies and much more. There is constant movement of people here, with many shouting out to potential customers. Work begins here in the very early morning and ends in the evening. The market is filled at all hours with truck drivers, sellers, buyers, butchers and cooks.

Basic Mexican foodstuffs is the backbone of this markets selling Mexican spices such as epazote, chili peppers fresh and dried of just about every variety, nopals (cactus pads), chicharrones (fried pig skins), corn, and less commonly-encountered products like wild mushrooms. One of the few places to find truly authentic Oaxaca cheese in the city. Vendors can be seen tying stacks of banana leaves, cutting spines from nopals, and selling “secret” herbal remedies.

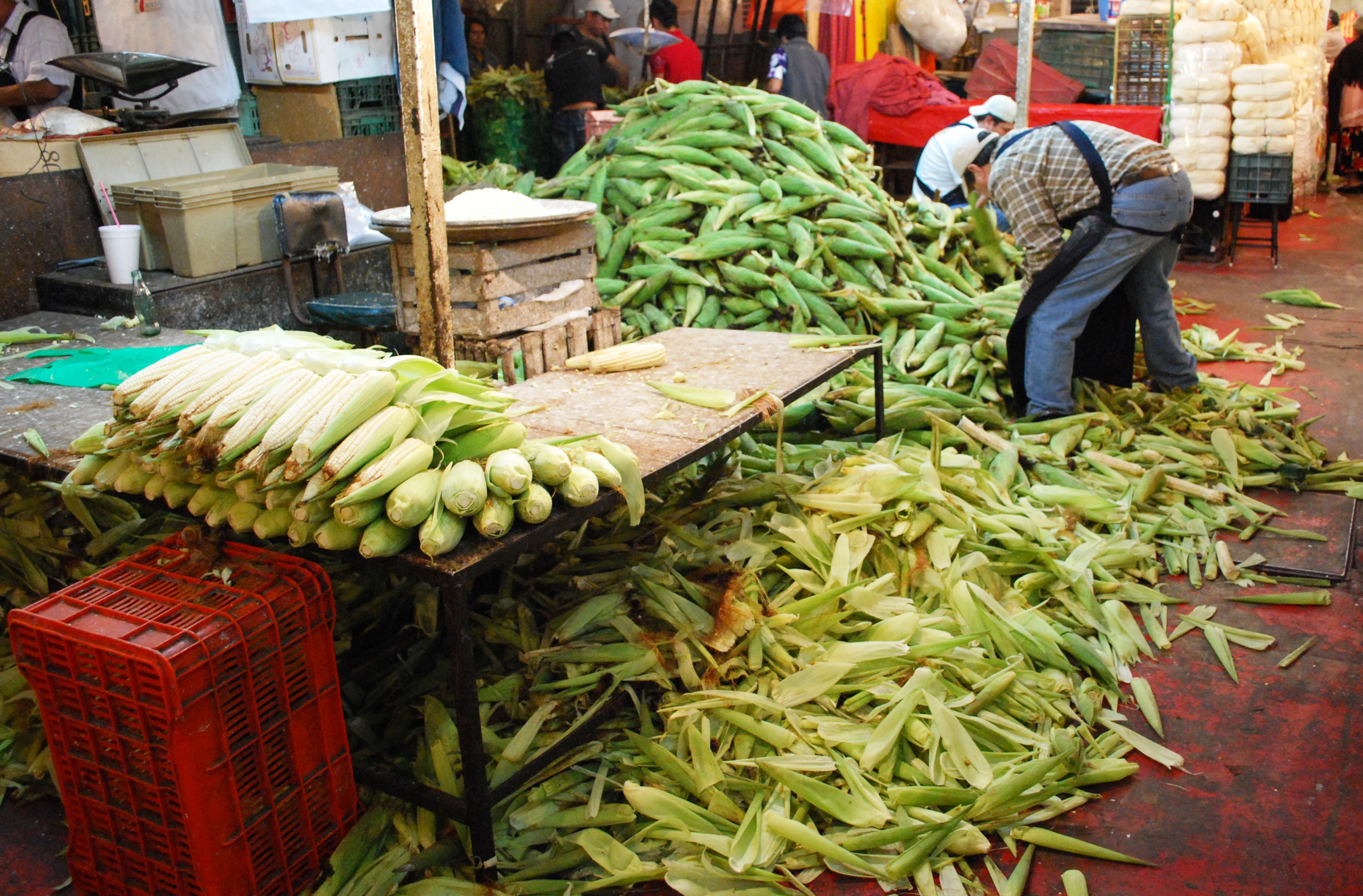
Merchant sorting through fresh corn.

La Merced, like most Mexican traditional markets, is a favored place to eat Mexican street food, called “antojitos” (lit. cravings). Two specialties here are quesadillas and tostadas. Quesadillas can be had with a variety of fillings along with the cheese (typically Oaxaca cheese) such as stewed pork stomach, pickled pork fat, huitlacoche (corn fungus) and squash flowers. The quesadillas sold here are typically long and cooked on a comal, often from blue corn dough. Quesadillas are usually served with salsas made from red or green chiles, onions, and other flavorful vegetables. Like the quesadillas, tostadas have a wide variety of toppings and the crunchy tortilla sometimes has unusual flavorings such as sesame seeds and chipotle.

== Prostitution ==
Merced is considered to be a “tolerance zone” for prostitution, meaning that police generally do not intervene. Prostitution exists in just about all parts of Mexico City but it is most obvious here. At almost any hour of the day, scantily clad women can be seen walking around. Many of these prostitutes are underage. Prices can be as low as US$15 for an “encuentro” (encounter). Many small hotels are near here, some of which charge as little as 30 pesos for an hour or about 200 for a night. Many of the customers are truck drivers who have time while their vehicles are being unloaded at the market. In 2007-2008 several prostitutes were murdered. Nearly all of the murders have gone unpunished. It is estimated about one third of prostitutes here are underage. Bribes to officials to keep the industry running are estimated to be about US$450,000 a year.
