= Merced metro station =

Mexico City metro station

Merced
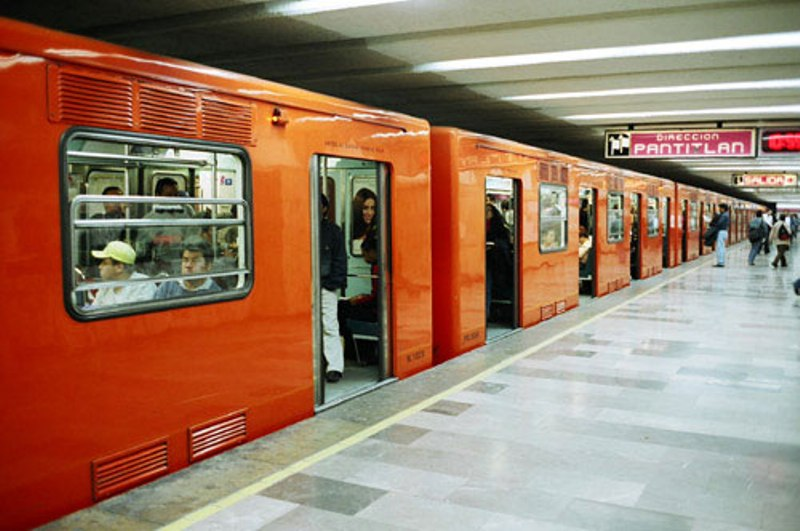

General information
- Location: Merced Balbuena, Venustiano Carranza; Mexico City; Mexico
- Coordinates: 19.425558°N 99.124639°W
- System: Mexico City Metro
- Operator: Sistema de Transporte Colectivo (STC)
- Platforms: 2 side platforms
- Tracks: 2
- Connections: La Merced

Construction
- Structure type: Underground
- Platform levels: 1
- Parking: No
- Cycle facilities: No

Other information
- Status: In service

History
- Opened: 4 September 1969; 56 years ago

Key dates
- 11 July 2022: Temporarily closed
- 29 October 2023: Reopened

Passengers
- 2025: 12,385,822 (Note: The data here is limited to the most recent ten years to avoid excessive listings; earlier figures can be found in this page's history or on the Mexico City Metro website. To calculate the average daily ridership, the annual total is divided by 365 days (366 in leap years), with decimals omitted from the result. Each station per line is ranked individually, as the system counts transfer stations separately. The percentage change is calculated automatically using the data from the current year and the previous year.) ▲27.16%
- Rank: 16/195

Services
Preceding station	Mexico City Metro	Following station
Pino Suárez toward Observatorio	Line 1	Candelaria toward Pantitlán
Route map
Location
- Location within Mexico City
- Area map

Merced is an underground station on Line 1 of the Mexico City Metro. It is located in the Venustiano Carranza borough, slightly to the east of the centre of Mexico City. The station building was designed by Félix Candela, and it was opened on 4 September 1969. From July 2022 to October 2023, the station was closed due to modernization works on the tunnel and the line's technical equipment.

== Iconography ==
The station logo depicts a box with apples. Its name is taken from the surrounding area, where La Merced Monastery once stood. Outside the station is the La Merced Market – one of the largest in the city, second only to the Central de Abasto down in Iztapalapa borough.

== General information ==
Metro Merced is connected with the interior corridors of the market. It has a baggage-o-meter, like Metro Autobuses del Norte and Metro Terminal Aérea. Outside the market are other markets, such as Mercado de Sonora, and wholesale outlets that sell plastic goods, bags, shoes, electronics, and some general stores. This station is located near Avenida Anillo de Circunvalación.

== Nearby ==
- La Merced Market, traditional public market.
- Mercado de Sonora, city-established traditional market.

== Exits ==
- West: Avenida Anillo de Circunvalación and Plaza Carrizal, Merced
- East: La Merced Market, Merced Balbuena

== Ridership ==
Annual passenger ridership
Year	Ridership	Average daily	Rank	% change	Ref.
2025	12,385,822	33,933	16/195	+27.16%
2024	9,740,418	26,613	28/195	+522.98%
2023	1,563,531	4,283	168/195	−74.82%
2022	6,208,209	17,008	57/195	−45.78%
2021	11,449,206	31,367	11/195	+18.37%
2020	9,672,525	26,437	19/195	−46.65%
2019	18,129,244	49,669	16/195	+1.66%
2018	17,833,957	48,860	17/195	−1.74%
2017	18,149,919	49,725	16/195	−6.02%
2016	19,312,283	52,765	15/195	−0.68%
