= Pueblo Nuevo District, Chepén =

Pueblo Nuevo
- District
- Interactive map of Pueblo Nuevo
- Country: Peru
- Region: La Libertad
- Province: Chepén
- Capital: Pueblo Nuevo

Government
  - Mayor: Segundo Alberto Aguirre Calderon

Area
  - Total: 271.16 km^{2} (104.70 sq mi)
- Elevation: 72 m (236 ft)

Population (2005 census)
  - Total: 11,249
  - Density: 41.485/km^{2} (107.44/sq mi)
- Time zone: UTC-5 (PET)
- UBIGEO: 130403

Pueblo Nuevo District is one of the three districts of the Chepén Province in the La Libertad Region, Peru.

== Localities ==
Some localities of Pueblo Nuevo District are:

- Chérrepe
- El Milagro
- Huacablanca

== Nearby cities ==
- Chepén
- Guadalupe
- Pacasmayo

== See also ==
- Jequetepeque Valley
- Pacasmayo
- Chepén
