= North macroregion =

North Macroregion
- Macroregion
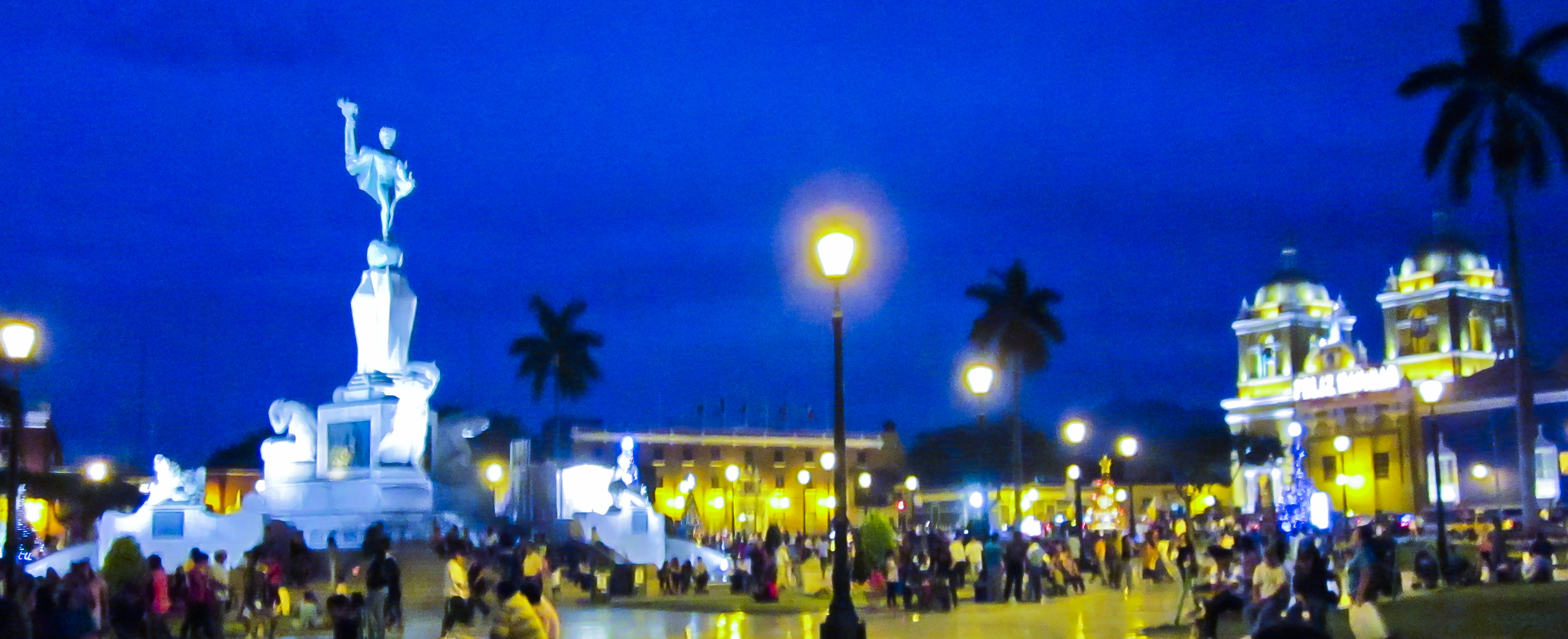
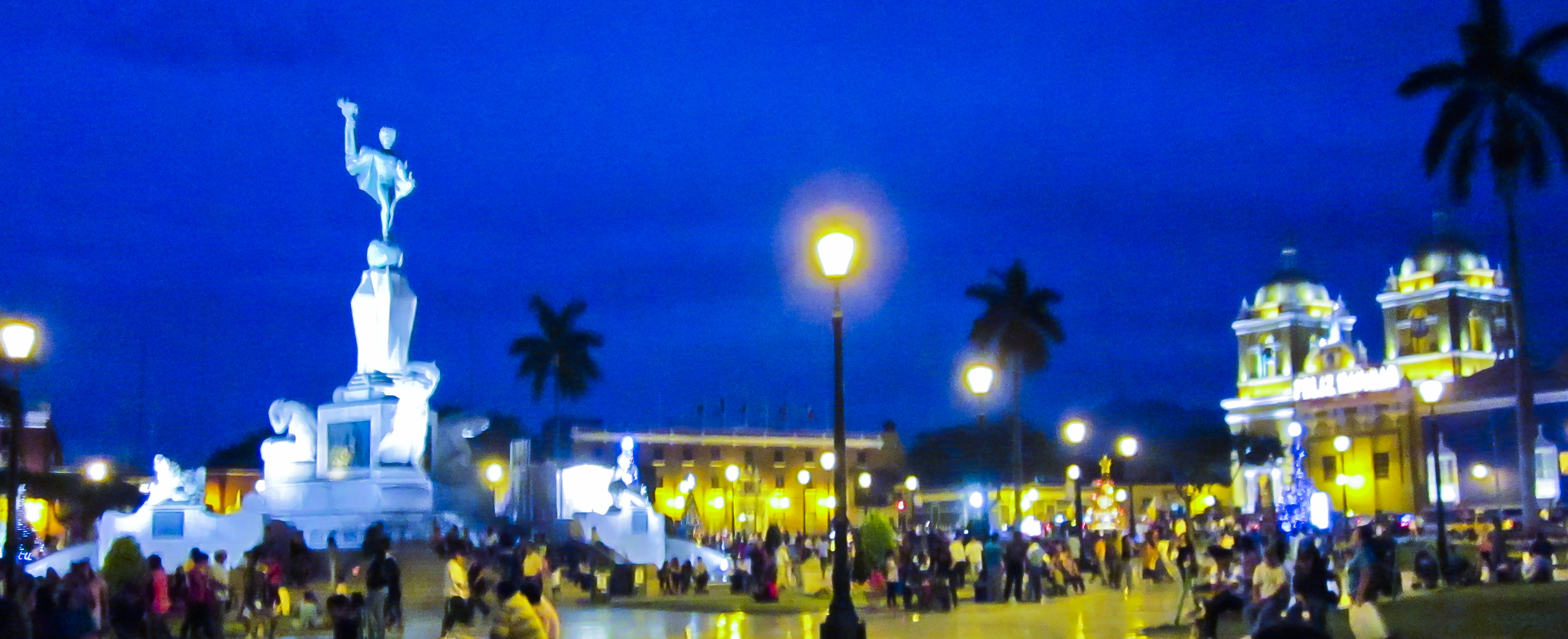
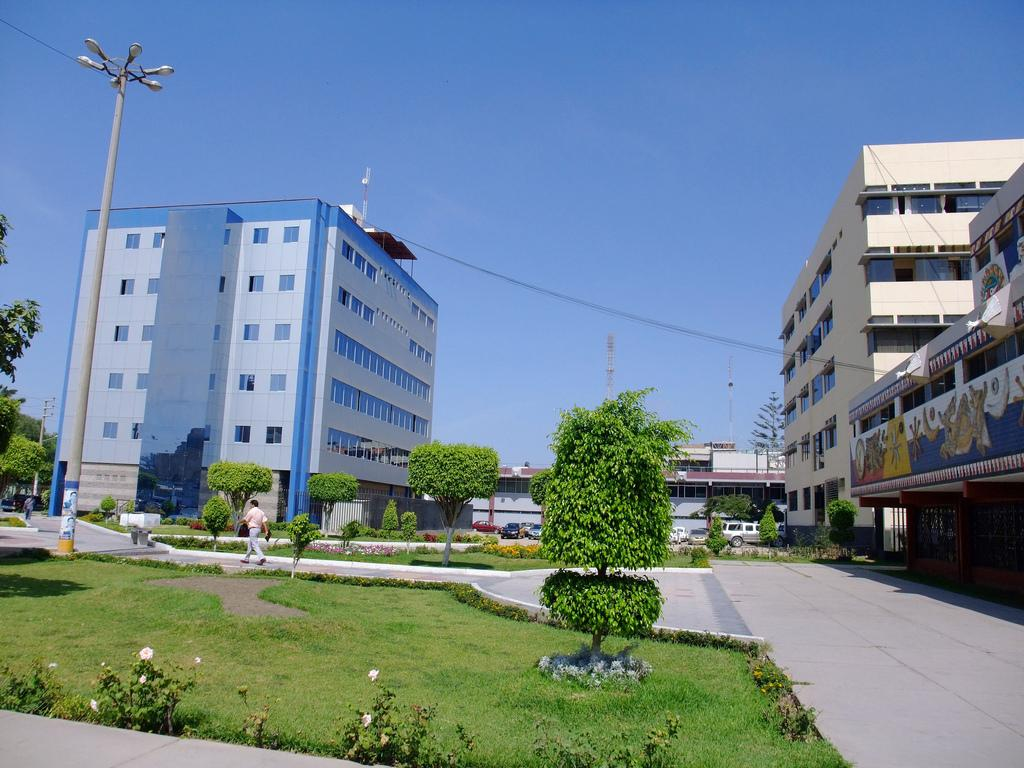
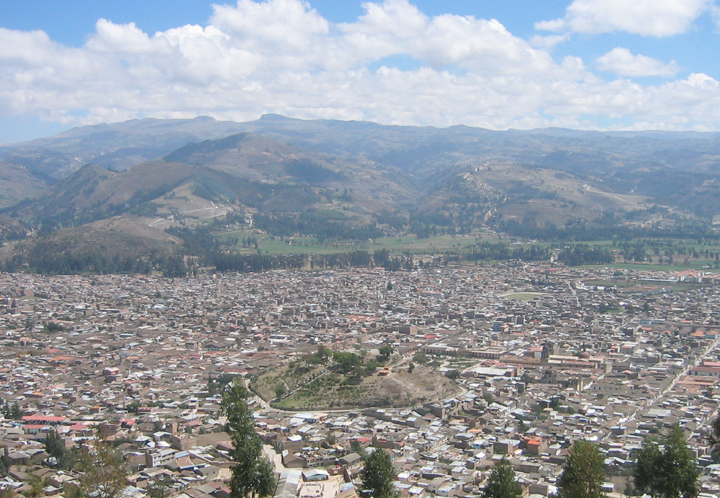
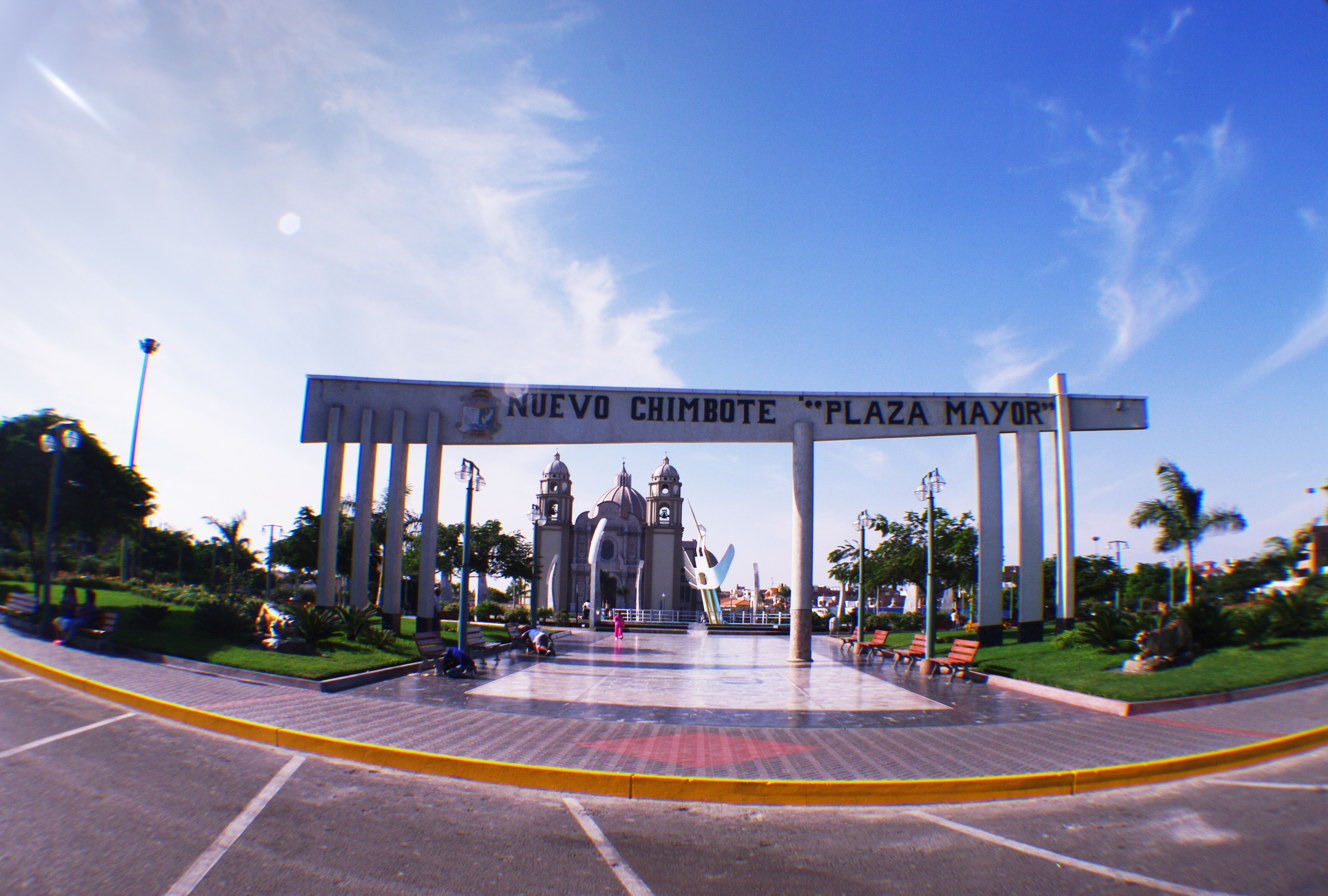
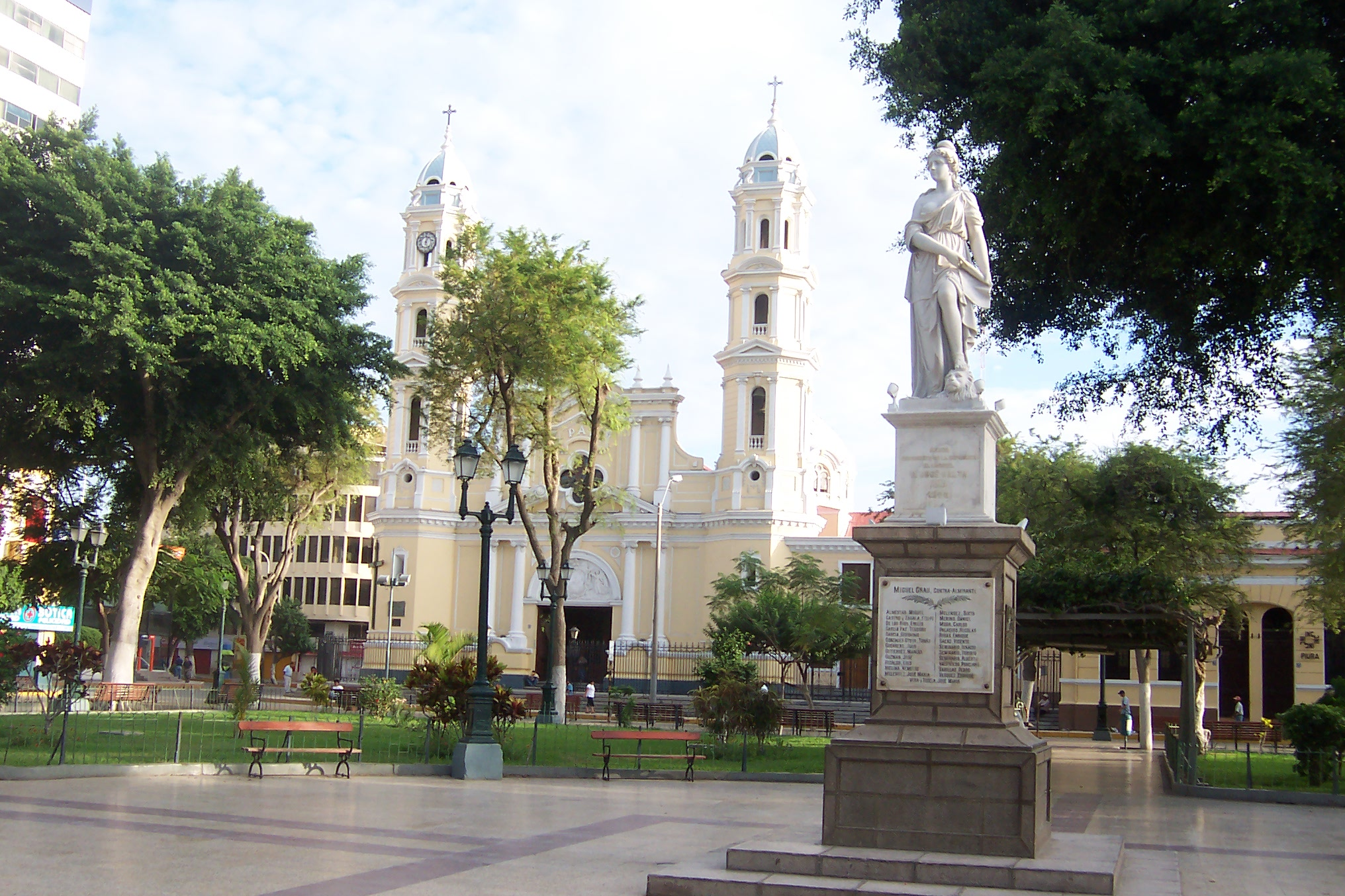
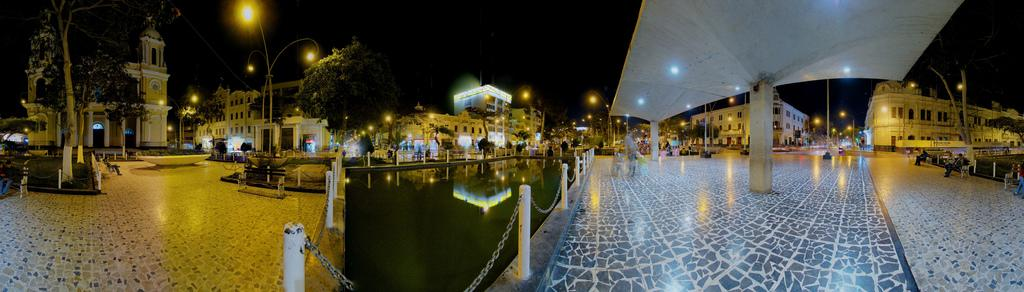
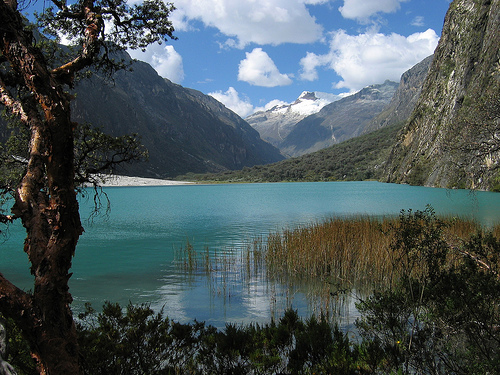
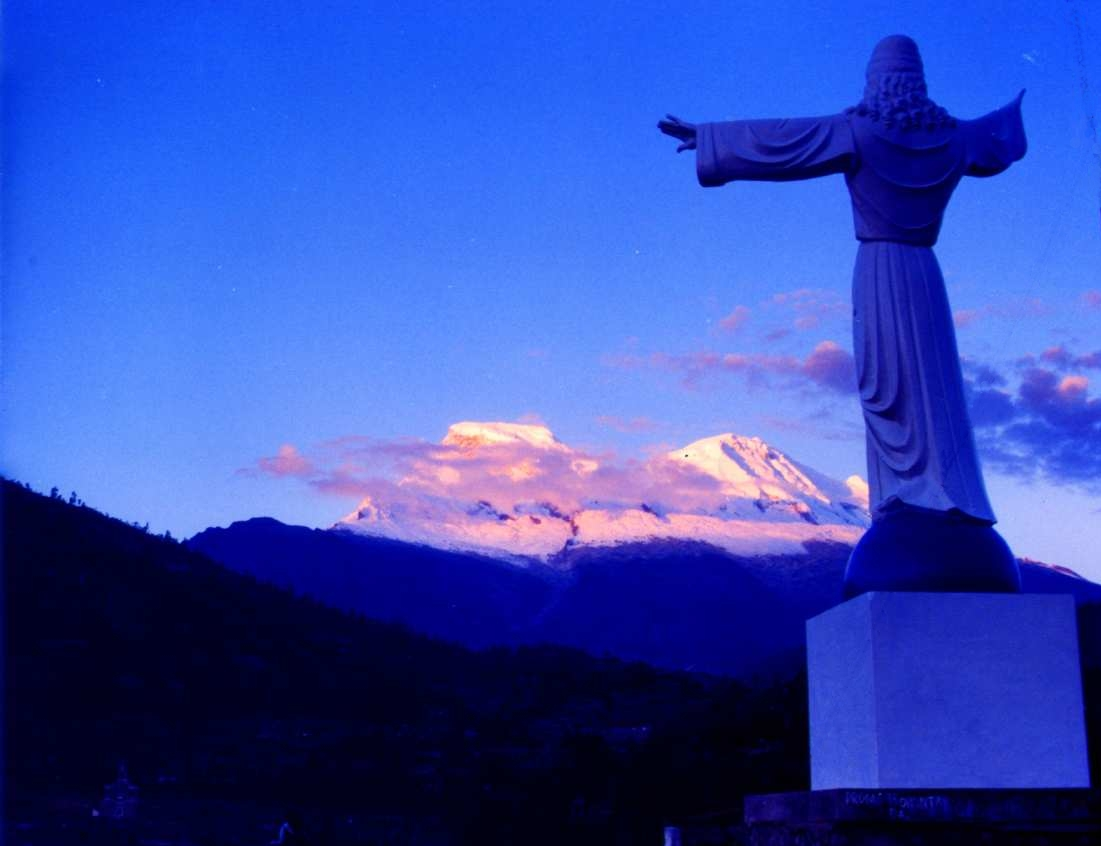
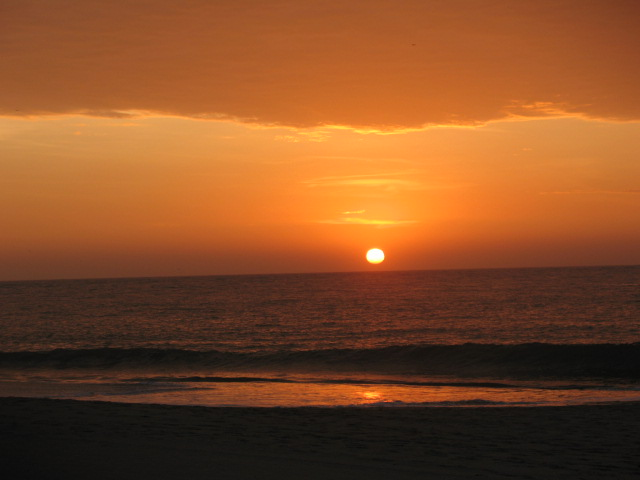
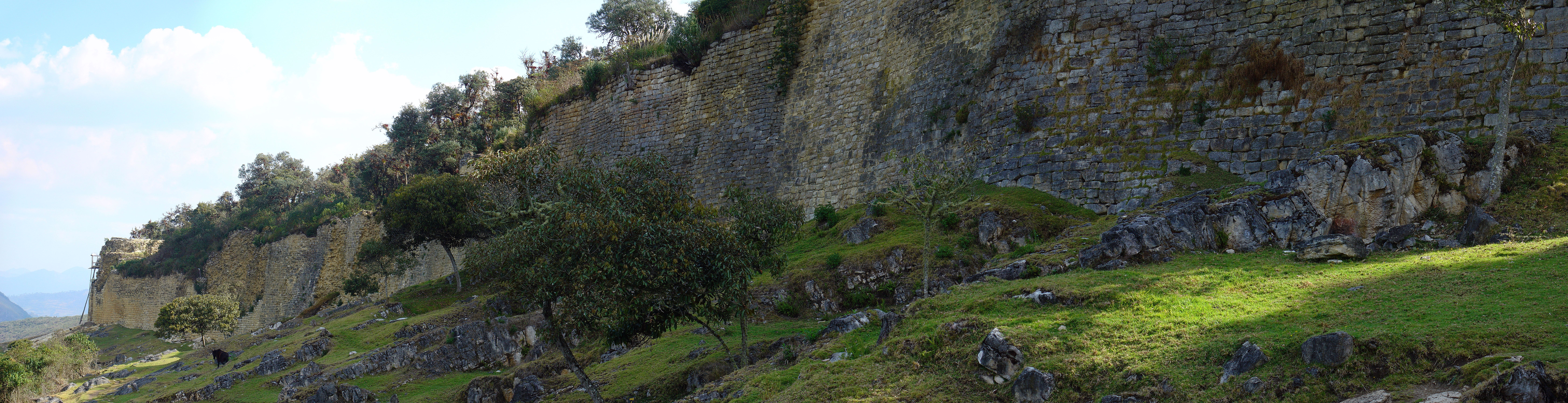
- Images from top to bottom, left to right: Trujillo main square, Chiclayo, Cajamarca,
- Nickname: The solid north
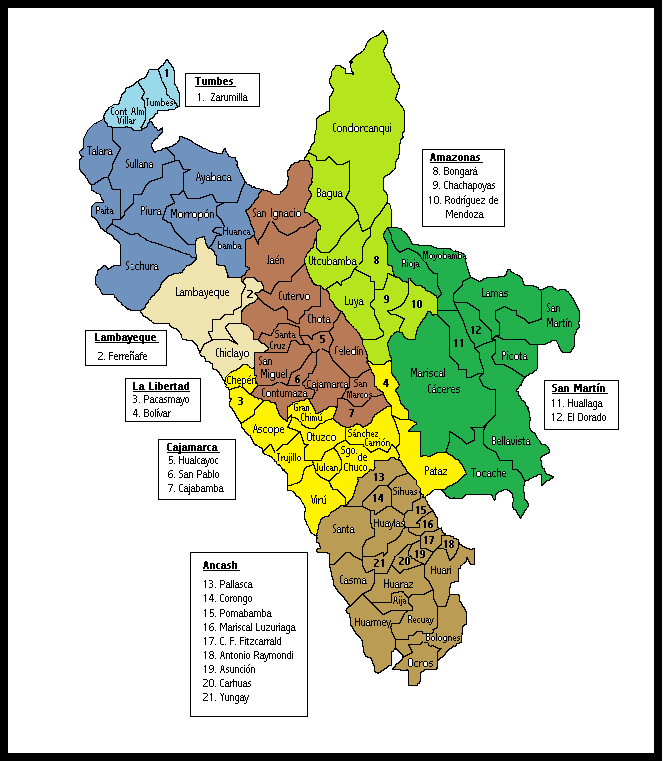
- Map of North Macroregion by Provinces
- Country: Peru
- Region: Tumbes; Piura; Lambayeque; La Libertad; Cajamarca; San Martín; Amazonas; Ancash.
- Most populated city: Trujillo

The North macroregion in Peru is a geographic area that includes a number of regions located in northern the country. It consists of the regions of Tumbes, Piura, Lambayeque, La Libertad, Cajamarca, San Martín, Amazonas and Ancash.

== Regions ==
Region	Capital	Population	President	HDI
Tumbes	Tumbes	200.306	Wilmer Dios Benites	0,776 medium
Piura	San Miguel de Piura	1.673.315	Javier Atkins Lerggios	0,755 medium
Lambayeque	Chiclayo	1.112.868	Humberto Acuña Peralta	0,779 medium high
La Libertad	Trujillo	1.617.050	José Murgia Zannier	0,621 medium high
Cajamarca	Cajamarca	1.455.201	Gregorio Santos Guerrero	0,900 medium
San Martín	Moyobamba	800.000	César Villanueva Arévalo	0,739 medium
Amazonas	Chachapoyas	375.993	José Arista	0,694 medium
Ancash	Huaraz	1.063.459	César Álvarez Aguilar	0,754 medium

== Main cities ==
Main cities ordered by population.

Nº.	City	Population Censo 2007	Province	Region	Mayor
1°	Trujillo	682.834	Trujillo	La Libertad	Cesar Acuña Peralta
2°	Chiclayo	574.408	Chiclayo	Lambayeque	Roberto Torres Gonzáles
3°	Piura	450.363	Piura	Piura	Ruby Rodríguez de Aguilar
4°	Cajamarca	283.767	Cajamarca	Cajamarca	Ramiro Bardales Vigo
5°	Huaraz	170.000	Huaraz	Ancash	Vladimir Meza Villarreal
6°	Tumbes	80.000	Tumbes	Tumbes	Ventura Cruz
7°	Moyobamba	79 000	Moyobamba	San Martín	Víctor Del Castillo Reategui
8°	Chachapoyas	35.789	Chachapoyas	Amazonas	Diógenes Humberto Zavaleta

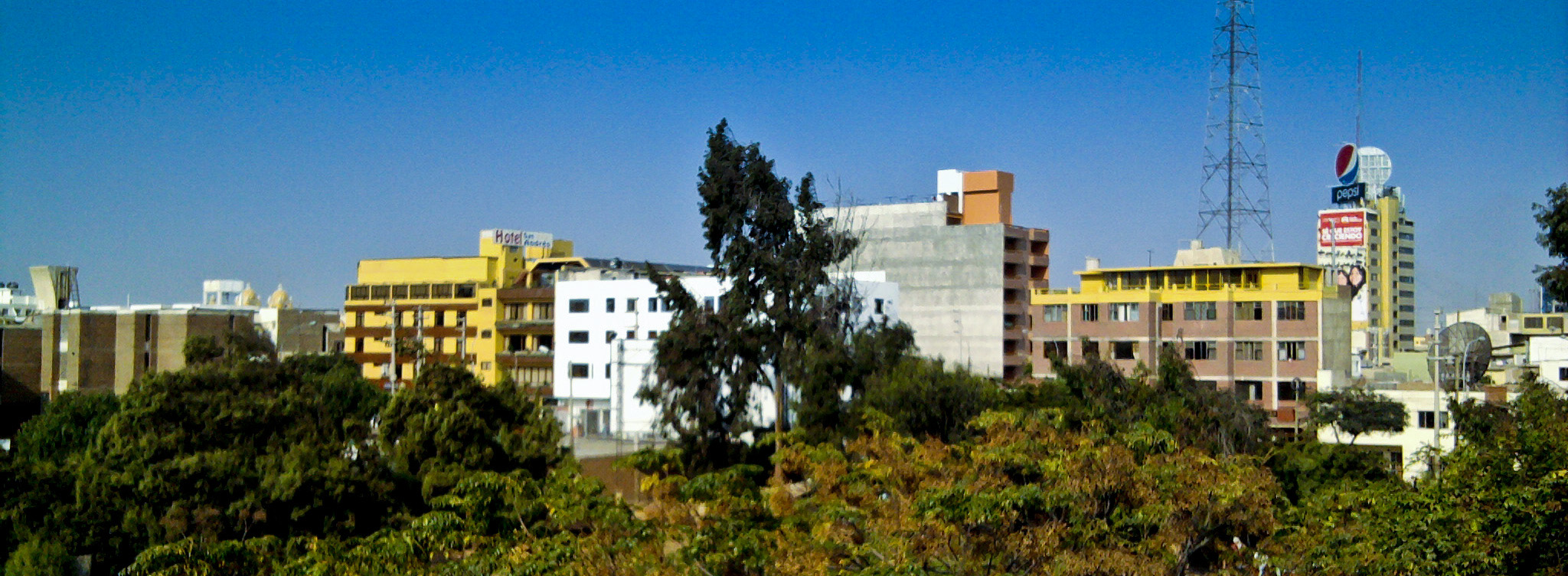
Trujillo city

=== More cities ===
City	Province	Región	Population	Mayor
Zarumilla	Zarumilla	Tumbes	16.925	Feliz Ernesto Garrido Rivera
Paita	Paita	Piura	120.718	Porfirio Meca Andrade
Sullana	Sullana	Piura	227.615	Jorge Camino Calle
Talara	Talara	Piura	84.978	Rogelio Trelles Saavedra
Lambayeque	Lambayeque	Lambayeque	63.386	Jacinto Muro Távara
Ferreñafe	Ferreñafe	Lambayeque	44.411	José Francisco Gonzáles
Pacasmayo	Pacasmayo	La Libertad	26.125	Oscar Honorio Horna
Guadalupe	Pacasmayo	La Libertad	36,580	Lourdes Placencia Zapata
Chepén	Chepén	La Libertad	44,22	Wilfredo Quesquén Terrones
Santiago de Chuco	Santiago de Chuco	La Libertad	25.000	Juan Gabriel Alipio
Jaén de Bracamoros	Jaén	Cajamarca	71.125	Gilmer Fernández Rojas
Chota	Chota	Cajamarca	60.000	Jeiner Ubaldo Julón Díaz
Celendín	Celendín	Cajamarca	24.623	Mauro Arteaga
Chimbote	Santa	Ancash	328.987	Luis Arroyo Rojas
Casma	Casma	Ancash	42.368	José Montalván Macedo,
Huarmey	Huarmey	Ancash	28,140	José Montalván Macedo
Bagua Grande	Bagua	Amazonas	49,956	Domingo Guerrero Dávila
Rioja	Rioja	San Martín	24,263	Mercedes Torres
Tarapoto	San Martín	San Martín	120.000	Sandro Rivero Uzátegu
Virú	Virú	La Libertad	36.029	José Urcia
Otuzco	Otuzco	La Libertad	25.134	Heli A. Verde Rodríguez
Huamachuco	Sánchez Carrión	La Libertad	52.500	Luis Alberto Rebaza Chavez

== See also ==
- List of metropolitan areas of Peru
- Regions of Peru
