= Pueblo Nuevo, Chepén =

Pueblo Nuevo
- Town
- Location within Peru
- Coordinates: 7°11′20.60″S 79°30′48.96″W
- Country: Peru
- Region: La Libertad
- Province: Chepén
- District: Pueblo Nuevo
- Time zone: UTC-5 (PET)

Pueblo Nuevo is a town in Northern Peru, capital of the district Pueblo Nuevo in Chepén Province of the region La Libertad. This town is located some 134 km north Trujillo city and is primarily an agricultural center in the Jequetepeque Valley.

== Nearby cities ==
- Chepén
- Guadalupe
- Pacasmayo

== See also ==
- Jequetepeque Valley
- Pacasmayo
- Chepén
