= Chérrepe =

- Town
- Location within Peru
- Coordinates: 7°10′20.08″S 79°41′25.44″W
- Country: Peru
- Region: La Libertad
- Province: Chepén
- District: Pueblo Nuevo
- Time zone: UTC-5 (PET)

Chérrepe is a beach and town in Northern Peru located in the district Pueblo Nuevo in Chepén Province of the region La Libertad. Located some 156 km north of Trujillo, Peru, this town is primarily known for its fishermen and the beach popular with tourists.

== Nearby cities ==
- Chepén
- Guadalupe
- Pacasmayo

== See also ==
- Jequetepeque Valley
- Pacasmayo
- Chepén
