= Pacanga =

- Town
- Location within Peru
- Coordinates: 7°10′16.88″S 79°29′9.01″W
- Country: Peru
- Region: La Libertad
- Province: Chepén
- District: Pacanga
- Time zone: UTC-5 (PET)

Pacanga is a town in Northern Peru, capital of the district Pacanga in Chepén Province of the region La Libertad. This town is located some 143 km north Trujillo city and is primarily an agricultural center in the Jequetepeque Valley.

== Climate ==
Climate data for Pacanga (Cherrepe), elevation 51 m (167 ft), (1991–2020)
Month	Jan	Feb	Mar	Apr	May	Jun	Jul	Aug	Sep	Oct	Nov	Dec	Year
Mean daily maximum °C (°F)	30.4 (86.7)	31.4 (88.5)	31.4 (88.5)	30.3 (86.5)	28.2 (82.8)	26.0 (78.8)	25.2 (77.4)	24.8 (76.6)	25.2 (77.4)	25.9 (78.6)	26.6 (79.9)	28.5 (83.3)	27.8 (82.1)
Mean daily minimum °C (°F)	19.9 (67.8)	21.1 (70.0)	20.7 (69.3)	19.0 (66.2)	17.6 (63.7)	15.9 (60.6)	14.7 (58.5)	14.1 (57.4)	14.8 (58.6)	15.5 (59.9)	16.1 (61.0)	17.9 (64.2)	17.3 (63.1)
Average precipitation mm (inches)	12.7 (0.50)	19.6 (0.77)	18.8 (0.74)	5.0 (0.20)	1.6 (0.06)	0.4 (0.02)	0.4 (0.02)	0.0 (0.0)	0.6 (0.02)	1.4 (0.06)	1.1 (0.04)	2.3 (0.09)	63.9 (2.52)
Source: National Meteorology and Hydrology Service of Peru

== Nearby cities ==
- Chepén
- Guadalupe
- Pacasmayo

== See also ==
- Jequetepeque Valley
- Pacasmayo
- Chepén
