= Chepén (disambiguation) =

Chepén may refer to

- Chepén, a town in Peru
- Chepén District, a district in Peru
- Chepén Province, a province in Peru
