= Óscar Felipe Ventura =

Peruvian politician (1943–2023)

Óscar Enrique Felipe Ventura (18 March 1943 – 22 November 2023) was a Peruvian politician. He was a Member of Parliament from 1985 to 1990. As of 2013 he was the spokesman of the Regional Committee "César Vallejo" of the Communist Party of Peru (Red Fatherland) (PCdelP-Patria Roja) in La Libertad, organizing secretary of the Regional Front for Defense and Development of La Libertad (FREDELL), as well as a leader the Social Affirmation Movement (MAS) in La Libertad.

Felipe Ventura was the son of Nicanor Felipe Urcia and Rosa Ventura Landivar de Felipe. He was a teacher by profession. He completed his primary education at the Escuela Carlos Gutiérrez de Noriega and his secondary school was Colegio José Andrés Rázuri. He completed his university studies at Universidad Nacional de Trujillo, obtaining a degree as a secondary school teacher with a specialization in Philosophy and Social Sciences. Between 1974 and 1982 he served as Director of the Nocturnal Section of the Colegio Antonio Raimundi in Pacasmayo. He later obtained the post of Director of the Nocturnal Section at Colegio Nacional San Juan in Trujillo, which he held from 1982 to 1985.

In 1966, he became a leader of the teachers union movement in Pacasmayo. He served as chairman of the United Teachers Front of Pacasmayo from 1970 to 1972 and was elected as general secretary of SUTE-Pacasmayo thrice (1972–1976). He was also elected thrice as undersecretary of the regional organization of SUTEP in La Libertad (1972–1978), and between 1978 and 1982 he was the chairman of the Front for the Defense of the People's Rights of Pacasmayo. He took part in the founding of the Revolutionary Left Union (UNIR) in 1979, becoming the Press Secretary of the party in his department. Between 1980 and 1984 he was part of the national leadership of SUTEP. The second congress of UNIR elected him to the National Disciplinary Committee of the party. He was elected to the Congress of the Republic in the 1985 election, as a deputy from La Libertad. He stood as a candidate of the United Left (IU, an alliance in which UNIR participated).

Felipe Ventura stood as a New Left Movement (MNI) candidate in La Libertad for parliament in the 2006 election. He obtained 1,129 preferential votes, the most voted MNI candidate from the constituency. He was a member of the National Leadership Committee of MNI. In total MNI obtained 2,228 votes in La Libertad.

Felipe Ventura was also a noted saxophone player. He died on 22 November 2023, at the age of 80.
