= Jequetepeque River =

River in Peru

Jequetepeque
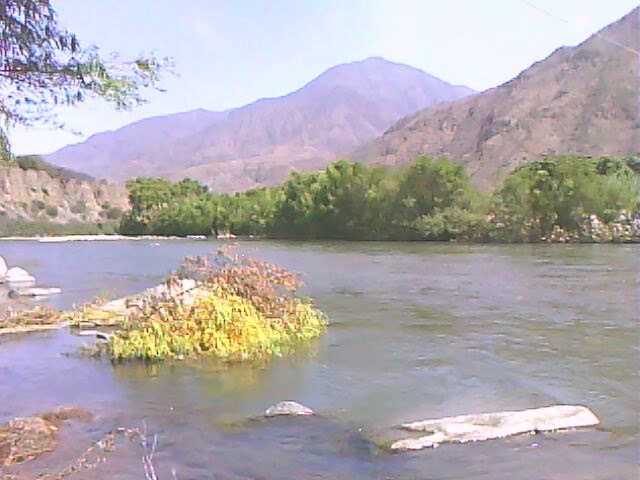
- Native name: Rio Jequetepeque (Spanish)

Location
- Country: Peru
- Region: La Libertad Region

Physical characteristics
- Mouth: Pacific Ocean
  - coordinates: 7°19′56″S 79°35′29″W

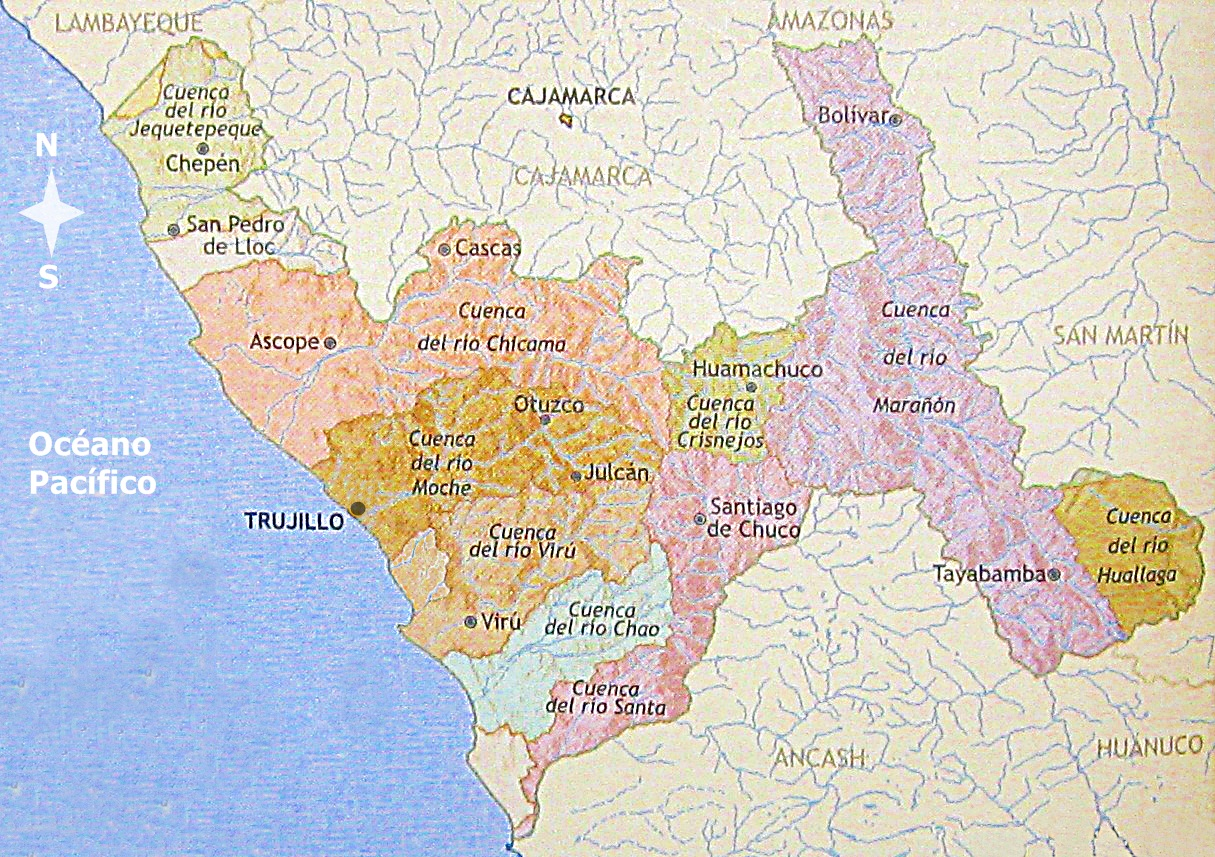
The Jequetepeque Valley is located north of the Chicama valley in the La Libertad Region

Jequetepeque River is a river located north of the Chicama valley in the La Libertad Region in northern Peru. Its valley has agricultural resources where one of the main products is rice.

In the Jequetepeque valley archeological sites of the Moche culture were found like San José de Moro and Pakatnamu.

== Localities ==
Some localities in the valley are:

- Chepén
- Pacasmayo
- Guadalupe
- Pacanga

== See also ==
- List of rivers of Peru
- List of rivers of the Americas by coastline
- Trujillo
- Valley of Moche
- Viru Valley
- Chao Valley
