= Chepén District =

Chepén
- District
- Interactive map of Chepén
- Country: Peru
- Region: La Libertad
- Province: Chepén
- Founded: April 18, 1935
- Capital: Chepén

Area
  - Total: 287.34 km^{2} (110.94 sq mi)
- Elevation: 130 m (430 ft)

Population (2005 census)
  - Total: 44,228
  - Density: 153.92/km^{2} (398.66/sq mi)
- Time zone: UTC-5 (PET)
- UBIGEO: 130401

Chepén District is one of three districts of the province Chepén in Peru. It is the second largest city of La Libertad, rice production center in the valleys of Chepen and Jequetepeque, and an active trading activities with neighboring Guadalupe and San Pedro de Lloc and other towns. It has factories in industrial dyes, food and primary production.
