= Julia Wong Kcomt =

Peruvian writer (1965–2024)

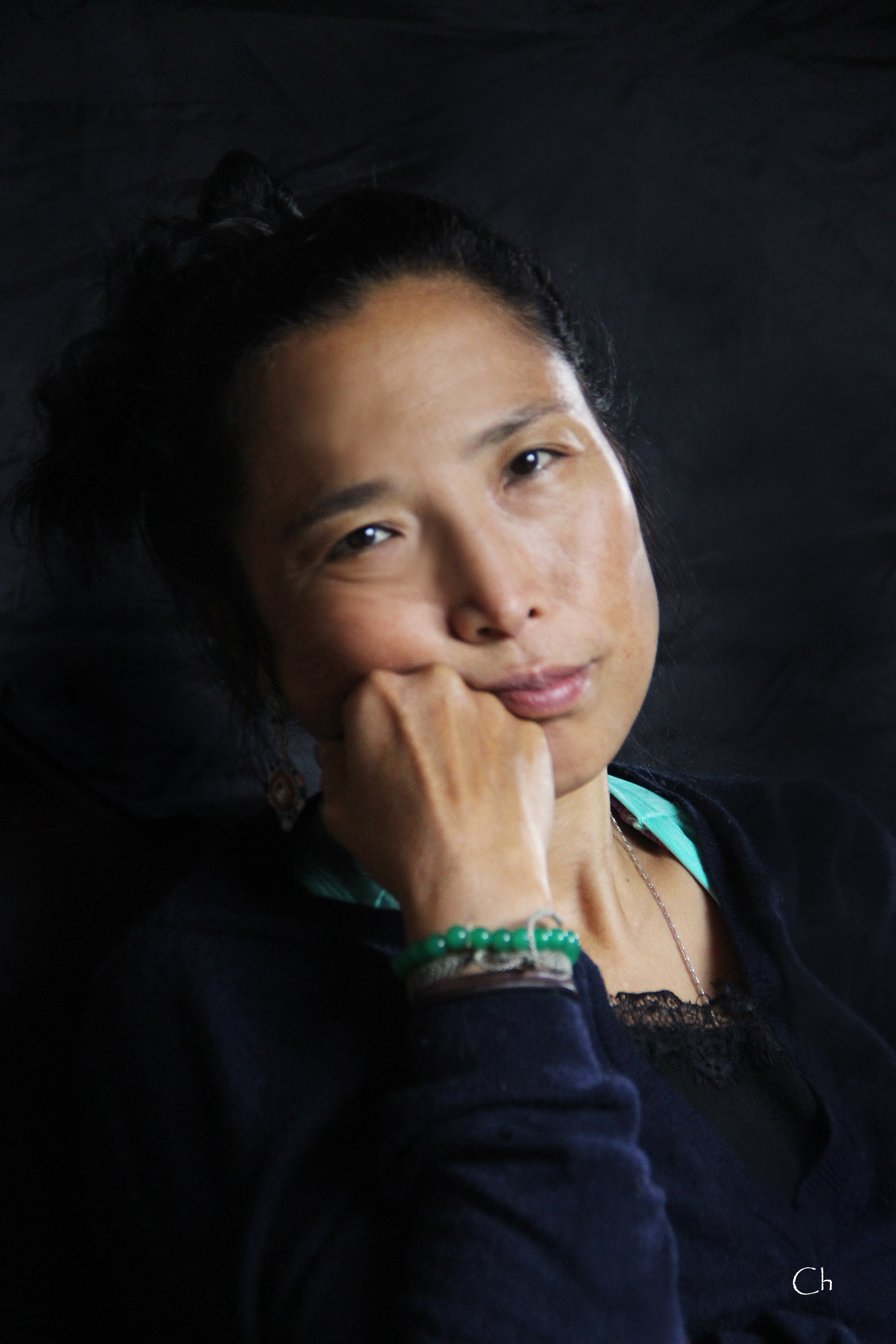
- Born: Julia Margarita Wong Kcomt; 1965; Chepén, Peru
- Died: 13 March 2024 (aged 59)
- Occupations: Writer and cultural manager

Julia Wong Kcomt (1965 – 13 March 2024) was a Peruvian writer and cultural manager. The author of dozens of poetry collections, novels, short story collections, and other works, Wong Kcomt addressed themes of identity, migration, and womanhood. She was heavily influenced by her Chinese Peruvian heritage and her experiences living across continents, between South America, Asia, and Europe.

== Biography ==
Julia Wong Kcomt was born in 1965 in Chepén, Peru. Her father was an immigrant from China, and her mother was tusán, a Peruvian of Chinese ancestry.

Wong Kcomt studied law and political science at the University of Lima. In this period, she studied on an American Field Service scholarship in Öschingen, in southern Germany. She won the University of Lima's Floral Games with her set of poems "Confesiones de mi tierra caliente" ("Confessions of My Hot Land"). She also studied literature and humanities at the Pontifical Catholic University of Peru. She enrolled in the Romance Studies Department at the University of Stuttgart, and later moved to Tübingen and Freiburg, where she became increasingly interested in Sinology, philosophy and theology. She took various comparative religion courses, particularly those exploring links between Buddhism and Christianity.

Wong Kcomt moved to Macau, where her father had lived throughout her childhood. There, she spent a semester at the University of Macau, where she took various English literature courses, and supported her father in organizing the Wong Ieng Kuan Foundation, which supports reading and culture through public libraries.

Wong Kcomt began publishing poetry in the 1990s, starting with the collection Historia de una gorda ("Story of a Fat Woman"), and gained greater recognition the following decade with books such as Los últimos blues de Buddha ("Buddha's Last Blues") and Iguazú.

In 2004, she moved to Buenos Aires, Argentina, where she worked continuously to publish her writing with small, independent publishers. She also studied cultural management there. Beginning in 2006, she co-organized the PerúBA festival of Peruvian art and cultural expression in the Argentine capital. In 2010, she co-founded the Poetry Festival of Chepén Chepén, in her hometown, as part of her interest in invigorating literary production in northern Peru.

Wong Kcomt was involved with organizations centered around the Chinese-descendant experience in Latin America, such as Tusanaje and Chiaarte. In 2012 and 2017, she curated two photographic exhibitions about Chinese migration to Peru and Mexico.

Wong Kcomt participated in various international literary festivals across Latin America and Europe. In 2014, she was part of the Peruvian committee invited to the International Book Fair of Bogotá. She spent her later years living between Peru and Portugal.

Wong Kcomt's writing was published in various virtual formats, poetry magazines, and specialized publications. She published dozens of poetry collections and works of prose, including novels, essays, and short stories. Her writing is marked by themes of migration and identity. In 2021, her poetry collection Bi-rey-nato was published in English translation as Vice-Royal-Ties.

Her book 11 palabras, which she wrote while battling cancer, was nominated for best short story collection in the 2024 Luces Awards. She died of her illness that March, at the age of 59.

== Selected works ==
=== Poetry ===
- Historia de una gorda. Editorial Libertad, 1992, Trujillo, Peru.
- Los últimos blues de Buddha. NoEvas editoras, 2000, Lima, Peru.
- Iguazú. Editorial Atril, 2005, Buenos Aires, Argentina.
- Ladrón de codornices. Editorial Patagonia, 2007, Mendoza, Argentina.
- Bi-rey-nato. Editorial El suri porfiado, 2009, Buenos Aires, Argentina.
- Un salmón ciego. Borrador Editores, 2008, Lima, Peru.
- Un pequeño bordado sobre la vergüenza. Matalamanga Editores, 2011, Lima, Peru.
- Lectura de manos en Lisboa. Melón Editora, 2012, Buenos Aires, Argentina. Editatú, 2013, 2022, Lima, Peru.
- La desmineralización de los árboles. Paracaídas Editores, 2014, Lima, Peru.
- Un vaso de leche fría para el rapsoda. Celacanto, 2014, Lima, Peru.
- Oro muerto. Cascada de Palabras Cartonera, 2017, Mexico City, Mexico.
- Tequilaprayers. Paracaídas Editores, 2017, Lima, Peru.
- Pexuña de dragón. Chile: Andesgraund, 2018.
- Urbe enardecida. Ubre enardecida. Viajera Editorial, 2020, Buenos Aires, Argentina.
- Antología poética (1993-2019). Gafas moradas, 2020, Lima, Peru.
- Sopor. Editatú, 2020, Lima, Peru.
- 18 poemas de fake love para Keanu Reeves. Cascada de Palabras, 2021.
- Vice-Royal-Ties (Translated to English from Bi-rey-nato by Jennifer Shyue). Ugly Duckling Press, 2021, United States. (ISBN 978-1-946433-85-5, OL 36024706M)
- La tercera guerra lunar. Spain: Liliputienses, 2023.

=== Prose ===
- Bocetos para un cuadro de Familia (novella). Borrador Editores, 2008, Lima, Peru.
- Margarita no quiere crecer (stories). Borrador Editores, 2010, Lima, Peru.
- Doble Felicidad (novel). Editatú, 2012, Lima, Peru.
- Los papeles rotos. Textos extraños. Ediciones El viaje, 2014, Guadalajara, Mexico.
- Mongolia (novel). Animal de Invierno, 2015, 2023, Lima, Peru.
- Pessoa por Wong. Hannan Harawi, 2017, Lima, Peru.
- Aquello que perdimos en la Arena (novel). Editorial Peisa, 2019, Lima, Peru.
- Océano al revés (novel). Ediciones Altazor, 2021, Lima, Peru.
- Cuaderno negro de Almada (novel). Editorial Gafas Moradas, 2022, Lima, Peru.
- La tercera guerra lunar. Ediciones Liliputienses, 2022, Spain.
- 11 palabras. Cocodrilo Ediciones, 2023, Lima, Peru.
