= Pacatnamu =

Archaeological site in Peru

Coordinates: 7°19′7″S 79°34′56″W

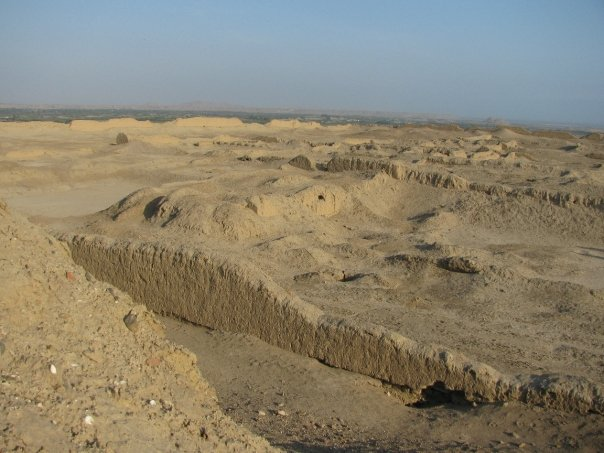
Pacatnamu archaeological site, Peru.

The Pacatnamu (Mochica : Pakatnamú, Spanish : Pacatnamú) site is located at the mouth of the Jequetepeque Valley on the northern coast of Peru. Rocky cliffs protect two of its sides and a humanmade wall protects the third. This area of Peru does not have a tropical environment; it gets very little precipitation and has a mild climate, which sometimes can become very humid.

== Excavation history ==
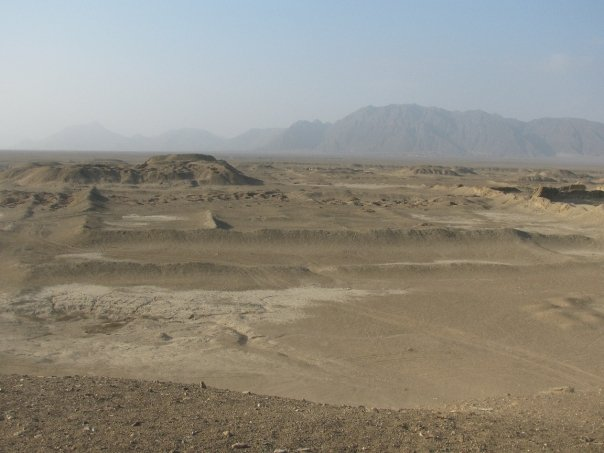
Pacatnamu landscape.

Explorers had mentioned the site of Pacatnamu since the late 1800s, but the site was not studied in detail until 1925. Kroeber made some sketches of the main architectural features of the site but only of one portion of the site. Archaeological excavations first began in 1937–39 by German archaeologist Heinrich Ubbelohde-Doering. He conducted more excavations in 1952–53 and again in 1962–63. His work resulted in more excavations of more pyramid complexes.

Wolfgang and Giesela Hecker joined Ubbelohde-Doering on his 1962–63 excavations. They produced a general map of the site as a whole as well as some detailed maps of the architectural features. Richard Keatinge conducted an extensive surface survey in 1974 and published several brief reports on his findings. In 1983 the Instituto Nacional de Cultura in Lima approved the Museum of Cultural History at the University of California, Los Angeles request to do a five-year excavation permit at Pacatanamu. This excavation was extremely successful and from their research they produced hundreds of artifacts and created a chronology of occupation for the site.

== Chronology ==
There are two periods of occupation at the site: an early period when Moche ceramics were in use, and a later period characterized by the use of Chimu ceramics. Brick serration used in construction allows us to see a chronology of occupation within each of those times of occupation. Pacatnamu was unoccupied before the end of Moche IV or the beginning of the Moche V (ca. A.D. 600). During this Moche period some ceremonial architecture was constructed. During this time of occupation ceramics clearly show some Huari influence, but the textiles are clearly Moche. Also the burials from this time simply reflect Moche styles. Near the end of Moche occupation (ca. A.D. 900) a new ceramic form appeared which signaled the end of the Moche occupation. In approximately A.D. 1050 there is a break between the Moche occupation and Chimu occupation.

This period coincides with extensive flooding in this area and a dramatic change in nearly all artifact types. Around A.D. 1100–1150 there was another large population living in Pacatnamu with a new style of ceramics, textiles and bricks, and new architectural forms that help us date the sites occupational periods. The second period of population is known as the Chimu occupation. Major walls were built at this time because of a need for defense. There is a bit of unfinished wall to the north, which suggests they were trying to expand near the end of their occupation. Not much is known about why the Chimu occupation ended but it happened sometime around A.D. 1370. It is possible that more populations occupied Pacatnamu after 1370, but by the time the Inca conquered the North Coast the site was mostly in ruins.

== Agriculture and economy ==
=== Evidence of animal use ===
Llama proved to be an important animal at Pacatnamu both for everyday use and ritualistic purposes. Their bones are found in many burials throughout the site. The black vulture was also an important animal of religious life at Pacatnamu; its bones are often found with mass burials associated with ritualistic killings.

=== Specialization ===
Many of the buildings show detailed specialization, especially where it was necessary to specialize in making bricks. Textiles are very important to this society; they often show great specialization because of the varied array of weaving patterns and symbols (Hyer 1981). There are textiles found at almost every burial site. Also many buildings in the compound show use of textiles or evidence of textiles being made in the building itself. Pacatnamu has the largest number of Moche textiles found to date. There is also evidence for bead and copper specialization. The textile business was completely dominated by the elite families, who all specialized in, to some degree, textile production.

Usually the peoples associated with being master fishermen were only part-time specialists because their households were usually found outside of the city walls and their refuse piles show an even variation between shellfish and other marine life and wildly collected plants. This suggests that these people spent equal time in fields and in the water working to supply the higher classes with food, but also trying to collect food for themselves.

== Artifacts and agriculture ==
=== Architecture ===
Scholars disagree about what architectural style is most represented at Pacatnamu. The Moche and Chimu peoples are the two most usually associated with this site, but recently the Lambayeque group has been associated with Pacatnamu. Most of the archaeologists who work at Pacatnamu study the extensive wall system and the many huacas, truncated pyramids with mound top structures. The largest Huaca is the compound Huaca 1, located in the central portion of the site. The site features many distinctions between right and left entrances.

Apparently this right-left dichotomy is found in many Chimu sites. The right hand entrances in Pacatnamu are more elaborate and easily accessible while the left is usually filled with debris and more closed off, leading to more domestic buildings where evidence of food preparation has been found. The right side has then been more associated with ceremonial uses and/ or administrative purposes. The architecture is more concerned with visual perception and movement rather than function also leading scholars to believe the site was a religious center and not one intended for normal living conditions.

- Huaca 1

70 × 70m 10m high. The areas around this complex include courtyards, a two-level mound named the East Pyramid, and a large enclosure filled with compels architecture known as the Major Quadrangle. Both Huaca 1 and the Quadrangle are associated with the Initial Chimu phase.

- Major quadrangle

175 × 170m walls were originally 5m tall. There are three main hallways leaving this section the right hall is more architecturally complex and well organized. There is little debris visible, whereas the left entrance is smaller, less complex. Scholars believe this is evidence to Pacatnamu's past as a pilgrimage site. The right was more for ceremony, and/ or administrative purposed, and the left was for everyday use or food preparation. While the majority of this structure comes from the Initial Chimu Phase it also shows much construction from the Terminal Chimu Phase.

- Complex A

Complex A is found leaving out of the West Corridor from the Major Quadrangle. It is notable for its audiencia and a textile fragment depicting a ceremony in progress.

- Audiencia

Contains three Disturbed Burial chambers and an amazing collection of miniature ceramics and 93 miniature textiles, tine ponchos, loincloths, and a crown.

- Complex E

Is found leaving the central pathway towards the entrance gate of the site. The archaeologists found layers of plaster, which suggest a storage facility for ceremonial wood artifacts, adding more evidence that this was primarily a religious center.

- Funerary mound (H1M1?)

Located in the southwestern corner of the Major Quadrangle. It was built using case-and-fill construction and is approximately 30m in diameter and 2.5 m tall.

- Huaca 31 & associated structures

Construction of these structures span the entire history of occupation, but they feature Classic Moche Bricks (flat rectangular) *N. Wall Built with, to a degree, Terminal Chimu Phase bricks (Flat-Bottomed ovoid shape)

== Leadership and inequality ==
The structure of leadership at Pacatnamu is hard to determine because many archaeologists believe it was strictly a ceremonial or pilgrimage site, however Gumerman mentions that some of her research indicates that the elite of Pacatnamu were considered administrative and ritual specialists who were removed from subsistence production. This means the nobility had a place in a governmental/ ritualistic power over others. Some architectural features throughout the site show that peoples of higher rank in the over arching Chimu or Moche culture would come here for ceremonies, so there are special place for them, but there are no names of documents available stating direct leadership in the site of Pacatnamu. In general the architecture throughout the site is an indication of wealth and power differences; the more powerful received grander styles of monumental architecture while the commoners had a very common plain style of architecture.

There are no sources indicating that the site of Pacatnamu had a centralized government or leadership system, therefore many archaeologists believe Pacatnamu was a part of a greater civilization. Later periods of occupation show the residence building defensive walls, but later research into those walls suggests that while one main reason for their construction is defense it isn't the only reason. The walls have many functions, but there needed many hands to help build them, so their construction may be because a lord or king asked for them to be built and sent peasants to do the labor.

The building of the sites many walls suggests that there was an actual need for defense or whoever controlled the site perceived a threat, either way there have to be an army to help defend the city should it be attacked. While there is no documentation of a physical army or a battle happening at Pacatnamu the walls suggest that a height standing person asked for them because they could with their status and therefore there must have also been an army to help protect those walls.

The architecture of the site has been studied extensively and many of the large courtyards throughout the site have a right-left oriented structure. For Pacatnamu the more grandiose buildings with more ceremonial artifacts are found down hallways towards the right while down the left side hallways we find more debris less monumental structures. These left side hallways usually lead to areas that were used for storage or food preparation. The main monumental pyramid, Huaca 1, is surrounded by high walls that completely block the view of the mound from view, these walls have been speculated to keep those who were not allowed to know about or join in on the ceremonies, so this creates a hierarchy of those who can participate and know what's going on and those who cannot. The variation of artifacts throughout the site indicates that those of higher rank had more specialized and unique items and more complex architectural buildings were as the commoners had non-monumental structures and less fine wear beads and textiles.

Many of the studied burials at Pacatnamu have many grave goods such as, textiles, ceramics, sacrifices, copper and more. There isn't much differentiation between burials in terms of what's found in them, but some people are buried closer to ceremonial buildings like Huaca 1 and there are some people actually buried within the pyramid itself so that sets them apart from other people. All the burials at Pacatnamu have textiles, which were very important to this culture, ceramics, and copper. Lama sacrifices were important for ceremonies and are rare to find in burials, but there is evidence of this. The textiles found rage in their preservation and the overall quality of the item, the most impressive textiles are associated with people with more status, but there isn't anything else in the burials alerting us to the person’s identity.

Many of the burials at Pacatnamu have been looted so many of the skeletons have been badly damaged. In many all that kind be determined is the age of the person, but not their sex. Around the entrance of Huaca 1 is found a mass burial of mutilated young men. There are three separate burials all on top of one another; each burial was done at a different time. All 14 of the bodies found are of men around the age of 14, many of them died by multiple stab wounds to the chest and back region and it's speculated that multiple people did the stabbing. It's hard to determine why exactly these individuals met with this end, but it may have been part of a ceremony because it's obvious these individuals were not chosen at random. According to ethnohistoric evidence we know that some people accused of rebellion in Incan culture had many different punishments and many of these individuals share these injuries.

== Religion and ideology ==
"Pacatnamu offers "laboratory conditions" for the study of the art, architecture, and population of a major religious center shaped by the dynamics of local development and foreign conquest." - Christopher B. Donnan

Throughout the history of Pacatnamu many archaeologists believed it to be a major ceremonial and pilgrimage center for the Jequetepeque valley as a whole, but new evidence suggests that Pacatnamu was likely only used for ceremonies and for political and administrative uses and not for pilgrimages because of the lack of ceramics from the larger Jequetepeque valley and the burials in Pacatnamu suggest only the immediate residents and not a larger population of people. There are no written records from Pacatnamu even after Spanish colonial expansion. By the time the Incas controlled much of Peru the site was already in ruins. Much of its specific history still remains mostly a mystery to us.

Overall the general architecture from the Moche period leads us to believe it was a ceremonial or administrative center. There is monumental architecture, which demonstrates that it was the place of many ritual and ceremonies. The only evidence of rituals or ceremonies the offering room and the ritual burial near one of the defensive walls, mentioned earlier. The offering room confused archaeologists when it was first discovered in 1984. It was discovered in the Huaca 1complexe. There were two other rooms connected to it, but they were both completely empty except for room 3, the actual site of the ritual. The room was very full of artifacts including ceramics, bone (both human and camelid), metal, textile, shell, and organic residue. The whole room showed evidence of being burned once all the artifacts had been stored inside. Before this discovery the archaeologists had never encountered this ritual, but in 1995 at the site of Dos Cabezas there was a similar room found with almost exactly the same items inside of it.

There is already a tradition in Peru of burning offering so to give them to the gods instead of keeping them on earth. The Incas often burned textiles every morning to begin the day making the gods happy.

In Pacatnamu there isn't sufficient evidence to name or actually identify persons of higher ranking, such as kings or priests, but there are a few graves North of Huaca 31 that have evidence of high status people. We have no evidence about specific gods that the people of Pacatnamu believed in.

== Death ==
=== Treatment of the body ===
The burials in Pacatnamu do not show much variation between the sexes, but there is a small degree of variation when it comes to children's burials. We do not have sufficient evidence to tell for sure whether or not the peoples of Pacatnamu fit in with the traditional burial techniques of Peruvian ancients, but the Spanish noted that when a village member would die they would be mourned for five days then washed and prepared for burial. The bodies in Pacatnamu show great preservation, but we have no evidence of this practice in Pacatnamu. Women and girls usually have their hair braided, but overall most people are found with their hands and feet wrapped in yarn.

Their faces are not always but usually covered in cloth; clothing is also usually present, but this material does not always preserve so we have no way of telling if only some people were buried with clothing or all of them. Textiles are a constant in all burials in Pacatnamu. Donnan and Cock mentioned that the only elite class burial is north of Huaca 31 otherwise all other graves show signs of being those of common people. Elite peoples were buried in a series around Huaca 31 during the late intermediate period while during the same time frame a large number of common burials were found elsewhere at the site, but the ratio of elites to commoners is more in the favor of the commoners. Their graves are found most often. There are five different ways a body can be encased:

- Shroud Wrap
- Splint Reinforced
- Cane Frame
- Cane Tube
- Cane Coffin

=== Burial goods ===
==== Ceramics ====
Were found in both adult male and female burials. Ceramics are a very constant burial good and artifact all across the site. Gourds: Gourds were used to hold organic goods like corncobs and other agricultural crops although the people of Pacatnamu ate marine life their burial goods were usually agricultural crops like corn and quinoa. Gourds are more common than ceramics in burials.

==== Plants ====
Left out in the open plant life is seldom found, most of the data the archaeologist have found come from gourds.

==== Animals ====
Animal bones are found in most adult male and female burials, but usually only pieces of the animal, there is only one burial that has a complete llama skeleton. Other animals that have been found include: Fish, Guinea pigs, and birds.

==== Metal ====
Copper is found in all burials non-dependent on size or sex.

==== Decorative elements ====
- Ear ornaments

These are only found in adult female burials.

- Beads

Found in almost all burials, throughout all ages and non-determinate on sex.

- Feathered headdress

Only one of these was found in Pacatnamu. In other Moche sites feathered headdresses have appeared and are usually associated with high standing priests, but in this case the archaeologists believe this is not the case for the Pacatnamu one because instead of being made in copper it is made with bone and of lesser quality, so this is probably a common individuals try and making this type of artifact.

- Textiles

These are the most common burial good; they are found in all graves, but men usually have more than women.

- Spindle whorls

Only found in graves of adult women.

- Net spacers

Only found in graves of adult men, these are significant to fishing practices.

=== Disease and trauma ===
==== Degenerative joint disease (Osteoarthritis) ====
Mostly found in older people in their hips, knees, shoulders, and elbows. Usually associated with regular life stresses on the body. When found in the shoulders and elbows it suggests much upper body labor and when found in the back, knees and hips it suggests much lower body lifting and kneeling.

==== Rheumatoid arthritis ====
Harder to detect than normal arthritis, but the archaeologists are confident they have found minimal skeletal evidence of it.

==== Dental pathology ====
Most common people faced usually present with tooth loss and disease. This caused the most day-to-day pain the people of Pacatnamu suffered. This is usually associated with the diet of those living in Pacatnamu, while it was nutritious and well balanced; it was very damaging to their teeth.

==== Trauma ====
Fractures and dislocations were very uncommon in Pacatnamu, but the archaeologists found two examples of previously healed fractures, one case of multiple unhealed fractures and one case of a severe spinal injury, it was a skeleton belonging to a middle aged woman whose spine fractured at a 90 degree angle they stabilized the fracture and kept her at that angle for the rest of her life. Her knees showed some signs of stress and the archaeologists agree she continued to move around and function after the injury. There was also one case of an extensive injury to an adult males left eye; it is likely he lost the use of this eye in response to the injury or infection. The archaeologists found two cases of tumors both were most likely benign and cartilaginous in nature. The first example was discovered in a young male's femur the second case was found in a male's left thumb, it was growing in the bone shaft, this is known as Chondroma.

==== Developmental anomalies ====
1. The head of the left radius bone in an adult female: Articular surface of the bone was convex rather than concave, the bones surrounding this were deformed themselves to make room for the deformity.
2. The right humerus of an adult male was much shorter than the left and his head was very deformed. The left side of his face around the occipital region was much larger than the right side of his skull.
3. Female spine deformity known as a "butterfly" vertebrate.

== Warfare and violence ==
Although in the later periods of occupation the Chimu people built an extensive wall system it has been argued that the main point of these walls was not in fact for protection because of the many doors built into the walls. It is obvious thought that the Chimu were expanding Pacatnamu. There is no evidence of warfare specifically, but the mass burial of young men may be an indication that there was a small battle or the mass burial was for strictly religious purposes. Pacatnamu has no written documents to make a historical chronology off of, even once the Spanish arrived they never mention Pacatnamu, this is likely because when they arrive the site is already in ruins and abandoned.

== Writing system, art, and symbolism ==
There was no writing system used in Pacatnamu, so we have no documents or written records to research, but textiles were an extremely important feature of the cultures of Peru and South America. Many of these textiles depict important rituals and ceremonies so they can almost be interpreted as a written document in a more artistic form.

=== Symbols ===
Animals were very important to the culture in Pacatnamu, the black vulture and llamas show up frequently in the textiles. They obviously not only had an important impact on everyday life, with labor and food, but they both hold significant religious properties. Usually in textiles that are depicting a religious ceremony there is one person who appears to be more refined, the one who is probably in charge of the ceremony, but there is no indication about who this person actually is.

Hyer details the differences between the many different types of weave that could be used to weave a particular textile. Some designated a finer piece of material. One of the tombs found during the Moche IV holds the remains of an adult female, who is possibly a priestess. She was placed in a cane sarcophagus, or the cane coffin method mentioned above. Buried with her were a series of juvenile camelid placed around the head and feet of other juvenile camelids along with other offerings. There are many burial sites that have camelid bones as offerings this makes it clear that llama were indeed a very important part of the ritual aspect of Moche society.

- Plain weave
- Tapestry weave
- Alternating float weave
- Gauze
- Openwork
- Twill
- Complementary weft
- Supplementary warp and weft

Wool yarn is the most used for weaving and usually makes the finest material. For grave textiles they were usually done in cotton and wool weft, supplementary weft float pattering and plain weave techniques. These patterns are also found throughout the coastal regions of Peru.

== End of occupation ==
The date usually given for the end of the main period of occupation of Pacatnamu is around A.D 1370. Donnan and Cock speculate that there was probably a small group of people who continued to live there, but it was not very extensive. The majority of the population probably left in response to the Chimu conquest of the lower Jequetepeque Valley whose capital was at Chan Chan. Although there was a small group of people in Pacatnamu during this period by the time the Inca conquered the northern coast (A.D 1470) the site of Pacatnamu was empty.

There is no indication of why the people finally decided to leave for good, but the site still had significance to outsiders, there is some evidence that people went back and had small ceremonies there, but these were probably only a few families and by no means was it a pilgrimage center. Offerings still appear during the early part of the colonial period, but after this time the site loses its use because no colonial documents note its location or significance.

== Bibliography ==
- Donnan, Christopher B.; Cock, Guillermo A. (1986). Pacatnamu Papers Volume One and Two.
