= San Jose de Moro =

Archaeological site in Peru

Coordinates: 7.1819°S 79.4382°W

San Jose de Moro is a Moche archaeological site in the Pacanga District, Chepén Province, La Libertad Region, of Northwestern Peru. The site served as a ceremonial funerary complex between the years 400 and 1000 AD.

== Region ==
The site of San Jose de Moro is located in a small community along the banks of the Chamán River in the Jequetepeque District valley of Peru. San Jose de Moro lies along the Pan-American Highway between the modern cities of Trujillo and Chiclayo. The site occupies approximately 10 hectares at about 13 meters above sea level The desert region is sandy and dry in an area of the country that receives almost no rainfall; the arid conditions providing an ideal environment for high preservation of archaeological material. In the region surrounding San Jose de Moro, there are several other archaeological sites of importance including: Cerro Chepen, San Ildefonso, El Algarrobal de Moro, Portachuelo de Charcape, Pacatnamu, and Cerro Catalina.

== Site occupation ==
=== Middle Moche Period ===
The earliest occupation at San Jose de Moro dates to the Middle Moche Period of 400–600 AD. This early period is characterized by boot-shaped tombs and burial offerings consisting of ceramics and metals. The floors during the Middle Moche Period reveal 15 cm in diameter post holes that could have supported temporary structures constructed for visitors during funerary events. Other evidence includes hearths, pots with evidence of cooking, crucible offerings, and domestic pot sherds.

=== Late Moche Period ===
The following Late Moche Period (600–850 AD) relates to the height of Moche presence in the Jequetepeque valley. During the Late Moche Period large storage containers, or paicas, are found. These containers were used to store the alcoholic beverage chicha, which would have been consumed in large quantities during feasts and burial ceremonies. Evidence of heavy occupation includes: numerous hearths, food remains, reusable pots, and well-worn surfaces. It was also during the Late Moche Period that funerary occupation reached its peak with the presence of pit tombs, boot-shaped tombs, and chamber burials. The construction of the famous tombs of the priestesses of San Jose de Moro also occurred during this time; these powerful women assumed the roles of governors of the valley.

=== Transitional Period ===
The Transitional Period (850–1000 AD) at San Jose de Moro represents a time of change as the hegemony of the Moche empire waned and the Lambayeque state rose in power in the valley. The absence of centralized power during this transitional period allowed for a greater range of cultural expression as evidenced by the various types of artifact traditions found during this time.

The collapse of the Moche in San Jose de Moro was rather abrupt; nevertheless, the site was continually occupied during the Transitional Period. Relatively large quantities of foreign ceramics appear associated with local burials during the transition, including Wari, Nievería, Atarco, Pativilca, Cajamarca in several phases, and Chachapoyas styles. Later, these traditions coalesced in Lambayeque and Chimú cultures.

=== Lambayeque Period ===
The final occupation at the site ranges from 1000–1350 AD during the Lambayeque Period. San Jose de Moro declined in importance as a ceremonial funerary center during this time. Despite this, the site continued to hold some prestige and received several burials of importance. This period of less intense occupation shows more burials in the flexed position and containing symbols of the Lambayeque culture.

== Excavations ==
Excavations began at San Jose de Moro in 1991 and continue today in a program conducted by Pontificia Universidad Catolica del Peru and headed by archaeologist Luis Jamie Castillo. In 1991, each excavation unit held dimensions of 2m x 2m. In 1996, the unit size increased to 6m x 6m and since the year 2000, units are 10m x 10m in size. The larger unit size allows researchers to have a better understanding of the relationships between adjacent ceremonial and funerary areas. Excavations at the site have yielded three different types of tombs and indications of feasting in the form of large spaces for the production and storage of chicha. Caroline Coolidge an archaeology student revealed example of small-faced unbroken figurine in 2019 in San Jose de Moro. The peculiarity of this 1000 years old figurine dating back to the transition period between Moche and Lambayeque cultures was that there were no other items around it, as it was considered that objects like this used to be buried in graves.

=== Tomb types ===
The pit tombs at San Jose de Moro are the simplest form of burial. They are long, superficial graves that typically contain one individual with a few burial offerings. Pit tombs appear during later Transitional and Lambayeque occupations of the site with some pit tombs dating back to the Moche period.

Boot-shaped tombs are associated with the Middle and Late Moche periods. The tombs usually have a 2m deep vertical access shaft that leads to a horizontal vault or chamber where the deceased individuals are placed along with offerings. After burial, the vault is sealed with an adobe wall; an indicative feature of the boot-shaped tomb.

Chamber tombs are the most complex type of tomb found at San Jose de Moro. The chambers are built in a quadrangular shape with adobe walls and algarrobo beam roofing. The walls of chamber tombs sometimes contain niches or benches along the edges. The content and size of chamber tombs varies with the time period they are associated with. Chamber tombs often contain more than one individual and numerous grave offerings.

== Moche iconography ==
Moche iconography that appears mostly on Moche ceramics and Moche fine line pottery has come to play an important role in understanding Moche belief systems and ritual ceremonies. As the Moche had no writing system, the detailed art and iconography stands as representation for Moche practices and daily life. Anthropologist Christopher Donnan has even suggested that all Moche art is sacred and that even the most "mundane representations are of religious significance". Moche iconography is also indicative of shamans with depictions of therianthropic beings and intricate rituals.

== The priestesses ==
Over the two decades of excavations at San Jose de Moro several burials have been uncovered containing high status female individuals. The importance of these women is indicated by their attire and by the number and nature of the burial offerings in their association. Furthermore, several of the individuals have been in costumes and with ornamentation that is depicted in Moche iconography relaying the Sacrifice and Presentation Ceremony. This complex Moche ceremony consisted of human sacrifice and the offering of human blood in a sacrifice goblet that appears in Moche art. The women buried at San Jose de Moro are wearing the same headdresses and are interred with similar “Sacrifice goblets” that are seen in the iconography of these ceremonies. Their importance in participation in these ritual ceremonies is indicated by the extensive work put into their tombs, their lavish offerings, and the evidence for grand funerary feasts held in their honor.

Tomb M-U41, The first Priestess. The individual interred in this tomb was a woman aged 30–40 years old. The woman was accompanied by the same ornamentation as the woman depicted in Moche iconography as the Priestess. The individual was placed in a cane coffin that was covered with copper discs. Metal engravings in the shapes of arms and legs were attached to the sides of the coffin as well as a headdress shaped engraving at the head of the coffin. Five additional females were buried with the primary individual inside the chamber tomb. Funerary offerings in the tomb included: spondylus shell necklaces, metal objects, and ceramic vessels.

== Los Chamanas ==
Burial M-U1221- This burial dates to the Late Transitional Period. The tomb contained several female individuals who are thought to be healers or shamans. While the women were not buried with all of the normal paraphernalia of shamans, they had some items potentially linking them. The burial contains a child at the entrance of the tomb accompanied by three skulls, one of them having been cut clean. The burial also contained five mostly complete individuals. Original interpretations of the burial believed the individuals to be chamanas, or female shamans, with assistants. The first chamana is a complete skeleton with burial offerings on her shoulders. The first individual believed to be an assistant is incomplete and is associated with a condor bone musical instrument. The second believed chamana is on top of the first assistant with the condor bone flute being inserted into her vagina, the pelvic of the second chamana and first assistant directly one over the other. A final second assistant is placed on top of the first chamana and is incomplete. Additionally, a child was found on top of the remains of the second chamana. The entire tomb was then filled with other bones and skulls.

The nature of this burial and the associated artifacts have led to the interpretation that these women were Moche healers, or shamans. The incomplete skeletons and skulls are often indicative of secondary burials and sacrificed individuals. The animal bone and the nature of its placement along with the arrangement of the individuals in the tomb and accompanying burial offerings are all characteristic of high status individuals.

== See also ==
- Moche culture
- History of Peru
- Culture of Peru
