= Chepén province =

Coordinates: 7°13′36″S 79°25′45″W

Chepén
- Province
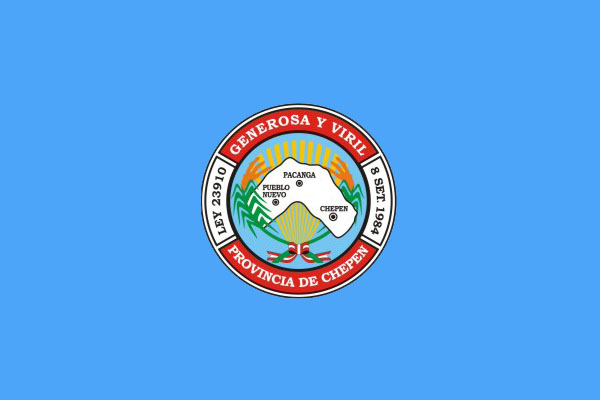
- Flag Coat of arms

- Location of Chepén in La Libertad Region
- Interactive map of Chepén
- Country: Peru
- Region: La Libertad
- Founded: 8 September 1984
- Capital: Chepén

Government
  - Mayor: Jose David Lias Ventura

Area
  - Total: 1,142.43 km^{2} (441.09 sq mi)
- Elevation: 130 m (430 ft)

Population
  - Total: 78,418
  - Density: 68.641/km^{2} (177.78/sq mi)
- UBIGEO: 1304
- Website: www.municipalidadchepen.gob.pe

Chepén is one of the twelve provinces that make up the La Libertad Region of Peru. It is bordered on the north by the Lambayeque Region, on the east by the Cajamarca Region, on the south by the province of Pacasmayo, and on the west by the Pacific Ocean. The capital of the province is the city of Chepén.

== Political division ==
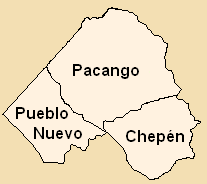
Map of the province of Chepén showing its districts

The province measures 1,142.43 square kilometres (441.09 sq mi) and is divided into three districts.

Nº.	District	Population Cens. 2007	Capital	Mayor
1°	Chepén	---	Chepén	---
2°	Pacanga	---	Pacanga	---
3°	Pueblo Nuevo	---	Pueblo Nuevo	

The population of the province is 71,954 by the Instituto Nacional de Estadística e Informática.

== Some localities ==
- Pacanguilla
- Chérrepe
- San José de Moro
- Talambo

== See also ==
- La Libertad Region
- Pacasmayo Province
