= Guadalupe, Peru =

Guadalupe Anlape
- Town
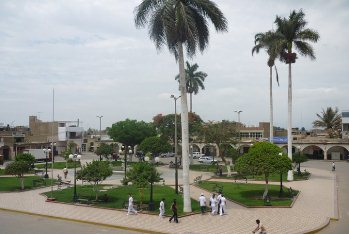
- Main Square of Guadalupe

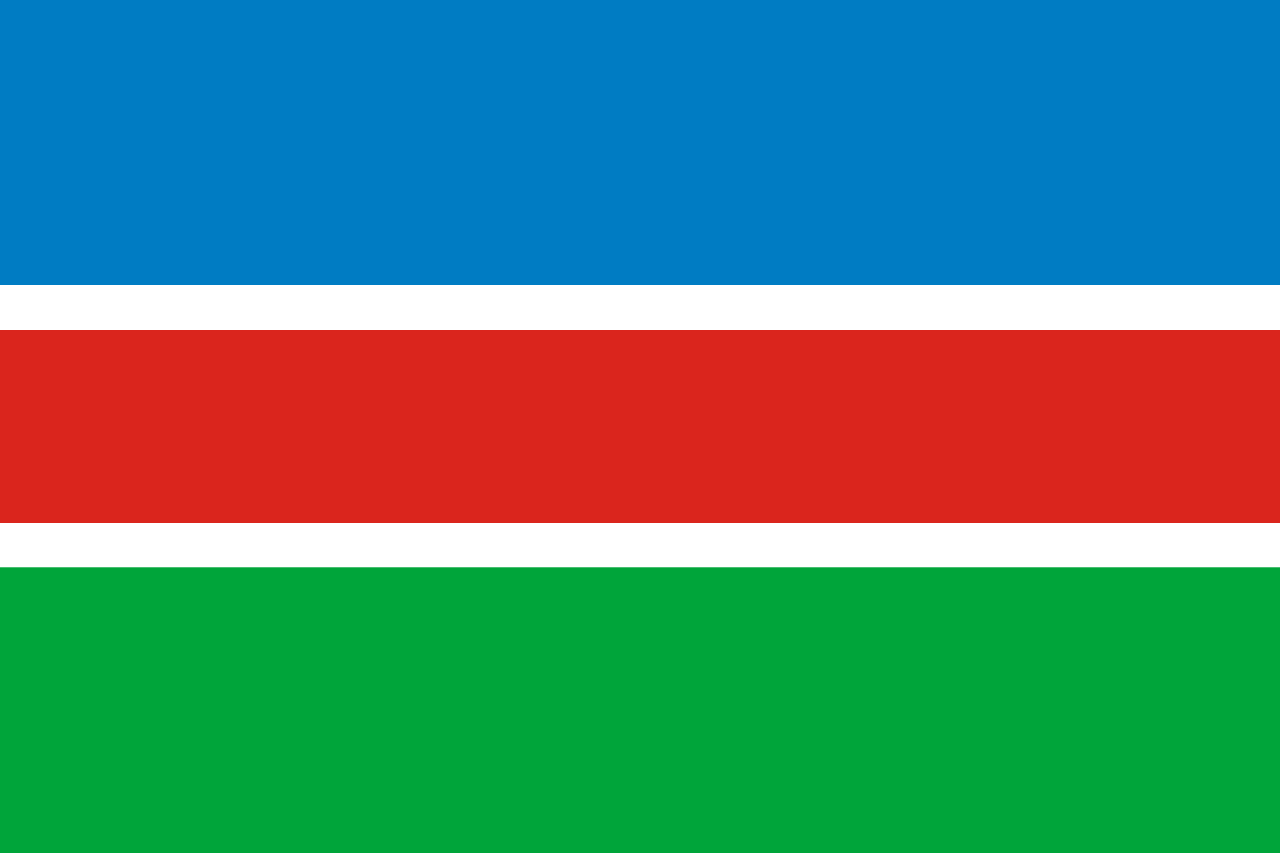
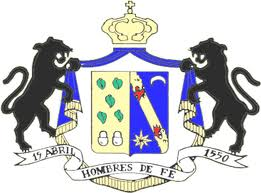
- Flag Seal
- Interactive map of Guadalupe
- Location within Peru
- Coordinates: 7°14′48.72″S 79°28′23.17″W
- Country: Peru
- Region: La Libertad
- Province: Pacasmayo
- District: Guadalupe

Government
  - Mayor: Benjamín Javier Banda Abanto
- Elevation: 92 m (302 ft)

Population
  - Estimate (2015): 43,356
- Time zone: UTC-5 (PET)

Guadalupe (Colonial Mochica: Namæl or Anlape) is a city in Northern Peru, capital of the district Guadalupe in the region La Libertad. This town is located some 127 km north Trujillo city and is primarily an agricultural center in the Jequetepeque Valley.

The Universidad Nacional de Trujillo has a small campus on the north east edge of Guadalupe.

== Climate ==
Climate data for Guadalupe (Talla), elevation 117 m (384 ft), (1991–2020)
Month	Jan	Feb	Mar	Apr	May	Jun	Jul	Aug	Sep	Oct	Nov	Dec	Year
Mean daily maximum °C (°F)	29.5 (85.1)	30.2 (86.4)	30.3 (86.5)	29.4 (84.9)	27.8 (82.0)	25.8 (78.4)	24.9 (76.8)	24.8 (76.6)	25.6 (78.1)	26.3 (79.3)	26.9 (80.4)	28.2 (82.8)	27.5 (81.4)
Mean daily minimum °C (°F)	20.2 (68.4)	21.2 (70.2)	20.8 (69.4)	19.1 (66.4)	17.3 (63.1)	15.6 (60.1)	14.4 (57.9)	14.2 (57.6)	14.7 (58.5)	15.4 (59.7)	16.1 (61.0)	18.3 (64.9)	17.3 (63.1)
Average precipitation mm (inches)	6.5 (0.26)	14.2 (0.56)	17.6 (0.69)	3.5 (0.14)	0.9 (0.04)	0.2 (0.01)	0.0 (0.0)	0.2 (0.01)	0.4 (0.02)	1.4 (0.06)	1.3 (0.05)	4.9 (0.19)	51.1 (2.03)

== See also ==
- Jequetepeque Valley
- Pacasmayo
- Chepén
