= Department of La Libertad =

Department of Peru

Coordinates: 8°0′S 78°30′W

La Libertad
- Department
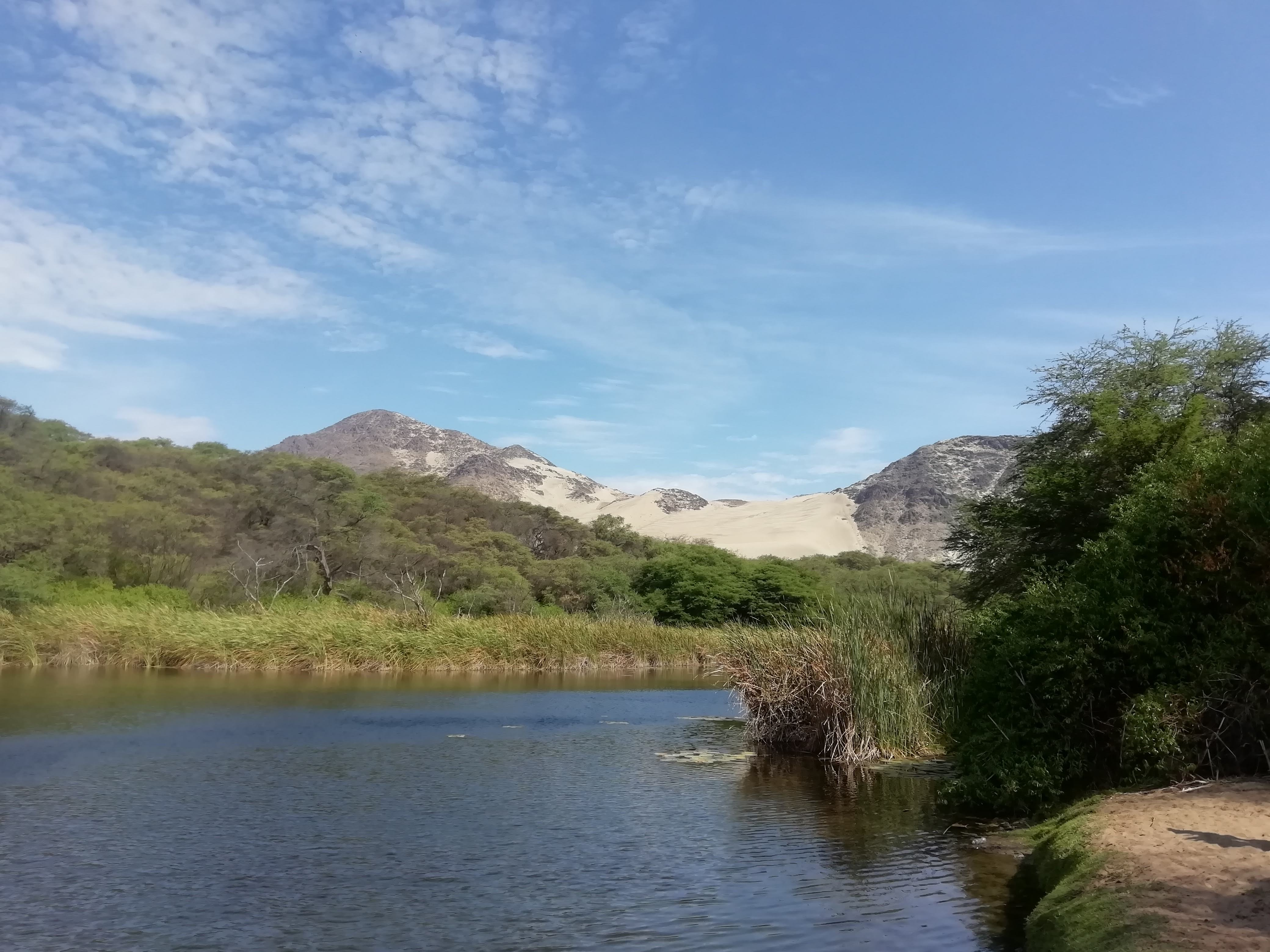
- Lake Cañoncillo

- Flag Coat of arms

- Location of La Libertad within Peru
- Country: Peru
- Capital: Trujillo
- Provinces: List: Ascope; Bolívar; Chepén; Gran Chimú; Julcán; Otuzco; Pacasmayo; Pataz; Sánchez Carrión; Santiago de Chuco; Trujillo; Virú

Government
  - Type: Regional Government
  - Governor: César Acuña

Area
  - Total: 25,499.9 km^{2} (9,845.6 sq mi)
- Elevation (Capital): 34 m (112 ft)
- Highest elevation: 4,008 m (13,150 ft)
- Lowest elevation: 0 m (0 ft)

Population (2025)
  - Total: 2,056,560
  - Density: 80.6497/km^{2} (208.882/sq mi)
- Demonym(s): liberteño/a, libertense
- UBIGEO: 13
- Dialing code: 044
- ISO 3166 code: PE-LAL
- Principal resources: Nation's largest sugar cane producer, and second-largest producer of rice.
- Poverty rate: 18.4% ▼
- Percentage of Peru's GDP: 4.18%
- Website: www.regionlalibertad.gob.pe

La Libertad (Spanish pronunciation: [la liβeɾˈtað]) is a department of Peru. Located on the country's northwestern coast, it is the ninth smallest department in Peru, but is also its second-most populous after Piura, and the second-most densely populated after Lambayeque. Its capital is the coastal city of Trujillo, the nation's third biggest city.

La Libertad is the site of many of Pre-Columbian Peru's significant cultures, such as the Moche, the Wari, the Chimú and, ultimately, the Inca Empire. It was ultimately conquered by the Spanish Empire during the 16th century and, after a series of administrative changes, ultimately incorporated as the Intendancy of Trujillo in 1784. It played a significant role in the Peruvian War of Independence, after which it was created as one of the foundational provinces of the Protectorate of Peru. In 1825, it was given its current name.

Its territory was that of the intendancy, which originally included most of Peru's territory north and east of Lima, including that of the former General Command of Maynas. Due to its large size, its territory gradually shrank from 1832 to 1874, with the creation of the departments of Piura (1837), Amazonas (1832), Cajamarca (1855) and Lambayeque (1874), after which it virtually acquired its current borders.

It is the site of two important heritage sites designated as World Heritage Sites by UNESCO: Rio Abiseo National Park (designated in 1983) and Chan Chan (designated in 1986). Salaverry, its main port, is one of Peru's largest ports.

== Etymology ==
The department's name honours its contribution to the Peruvian War of Independence. Prior to 1825, it was known as the Department of Trujillo.

== History ==
=== Pre-Columbian period ===
As with most of the country's coastal and central region, the area was once the home to a number of Pre-Columbian peoples, notably the Chavín, Moche, Sican, and Wari peoples. The latter established an empire whose area would eventually be absorbed into the Inca Empire, the last pre-Columbian entity to exist prior to the arrival of the Spanish Empire.

Prior to the Spanish conquest, the long-extinct and very poorly known Quingnam language was spoken in La Libertad.

=== Spanish period ===
Following the Spanish conquest of the Inca Empire, the area as a whole was incorporated into the Intendancy of Trujillo, a subdivision of the Viceroyalty of Peru. At the time, the area under its jurisdiction included present-day Lambayeque, Piura and Tumbes, as well as Guayaquil and El Oro in Ecuador.

=== Republican period ===
During the Peruvian War of Independence, the intendancy was instrumental in assisting José de San Martín's military campaign against Spain. Following his landing at Paracas Bay in September 1820, intendant José Bernardo de Tagle y Portocarrero and the city mayor led a rebellion that culminated with the declaration of the Independence of Trujillo on December 29 of the same year.

On February 12, 1821, San Martín issued a Provisional Regulation, providing for the creation of the Department of Trujillo, among others. San Martín's regulations divided the department into seven provinces:

Province	Capital city
Trujillo	Trujillo
Piura	San Miguel de Piura
Cajamarca	Cajamarca
Chachapoyas	San Juan de la Frontera
Lambayeque	Lambayeque
Pataz	Pataz
Huamachuco	Huamachuco

The Governorate of Bracamoros supported Trujillo's independence and declared its own from the Real Audiencia of Quito on June 4, 1821. It was later incorporated into the department.

The department existed under its original name until March 9, 1825, when a law by Simón Bolívar changed it to its current name to honour its contribution to the independence of Peru. This law also renamed its capital city to Ciudad Bolívar. While the city's name change was undone through another law on July 21, 1827, the department's name was not changed, and has since remained.

== Geography ==
La Libertad is the only Peruvian region that includes all three natural regions of the nation: coast, Sierra (highlands), and selva (rainforest).

Trujillo, the capital, has a strategic location, near where the Andes come closest to the coast. Seen from Trujillo, the Andes appears as a row of low-elevation hills. The Andean Plateau increases altitude sharply to the east, in the provinces of Otuzco and Santiago de Chuco. These two provinces comprise the Pacific hydrographic watershed, which give rise to the Moche and Virú rivers, to the south, and Chicama River to the north. Pacasmayo Province, located more to the north, is along the coast. To the east, Sánchez Carrión Province waterways drain into the Amazon River and thus belong to the Atlantic Ocean watershed.

== Demographics ==
=== Population ===
La Libertad region is the third-most populous in Peru; the census 2025 recorded 2,056,560 residents, representing around 6% of the Peruvian population. It was surpassed only by the Department of Lima and Piura. In 2012 its capital Trujillo is the second-most populated metropolitan area in Peru and the largest city in northern Peru. The largest population is concentrated in provincial capitals and districts, which comprise the majority urban population in La Libertad region. The migrant population to the region comes from border departments and immigrants from other countries.

Census year	Population
1981	1,011,631
1993	1,287,383
2007	1,588,177
2017	1,888,972
2025	2,056,560

=== Principal cities ===
The principal cities in La Libertad region are shown in the next table.

Nº.	City	Population Cens. 2007	District	Province	Mayor
1°	Trujillo	682.834	Trujillo	Trujillo	Daniel Marcelo Jacinto
2°	Chepén	41,358	Chepén	Chepén	José David Lías Ventura
3°	San Pedro de Lloc	16.198	San Pedro de Lloc	Pacasmayo	Victor Raúl Cruzado Rivera
4°	Pacasmayo	26.125	Pacasmayo	Pacasmayo	César Rodolfo Milla Manay
5°	Guadalupe	36,580	Guadalupe	Pacasmayo	Benjamín Javier Banda Abanto
6°	Santiago de Chuco	25.000	Santiago de Chuco	Santiago de Chuco	Juan Gabriel Alipioz
7°	Virú	36.029	Virú	Virú	Andrés Ostino Chávez Gonzáles
8°	Otuzco	25.134	Otuzco	Otuzco	Heli A. Verde Rodríguez
9°	Huamachuco	59,407	Huamachuco	Sánchez Carrión	Benito Robert Contreras Morales
10°	Cascas	–	Cascas	Gran Chimú	Juan Julio Iglesias Gutiérrez
11°	Bolívar	–	Bolívar	Bolívar	Odar Sánchez Peche
12°	Tayabamba	–	Tayabamba	Pataz	Omar Armando Iparraguirre Espinoza
13°	Julcán	–	Julcán	Julcán	Marco Antonio Rodríguez Espejo
14°	Ascope	–	Ascope	Ascope	John Román Vargas Campos
15°	Casa Grande	–	Casa Grande	Ascope	–
15°	Paiján	–	Paiján	Ascope	–

== Political division ==
Map of provinces

The Region is separated into 12 provinces (provincias), political divisions that generally correspond to counties in the United States of America. A Peruvian Region has as its head political executive a governor (governador), an elected official. The head political executive of each province is a lieutenant governor (teniente governador), an official appointed by the governor. These 12 provinces comprise a total of 80 districts (distritos). The provinces, with their capitals are:

Nº.	Province	Population Cens. 2007	Capital	Mayor
1°	Trujillo	811,979	Trujillo	Daniel Marcelo Jacinto
2°	Chepén	75,980	Chepén	José David Lías Ventura
3°	Pacasmayo	94,377	San Pedro de Lloc	Victor Raúl Cruzado Rivera
4°	Ascope	116,229	Ascope	John Román Vargas Campos
5°	Bolívar	16,650	Bolívar	Odar Sánchez Peche
6°	Santiago de Chuco	58,320	Santiago de Chuco	Juan Gabriel Alipioz
7°	Virú	76,710	Virú	Andrés Ostino Chávez Gonzáles
8°	Otuzco	88,817	Otuzco	Heli A. Verde Rodríguez
9°	Sánchez Carrión	136,221	Huamachuco	Benito Robert Contreras Morales
10°	Gran Chimú	30,399	Cascas	Juan Julio Iglesias Gutierrez
11°	Julcán	32,985	Julcán	Marco Antonio Rodríguez Espejo
12°	Pataz	78,383	Tayabamba	Omar Armando Iparraguirre Espinoza

== Economy ==
=== Principal companies ===
Some of the main companies in La Libertad Region are the following:

- Cementos Pacasmayo. It manufactures cement and it is based in Pacasmayo Province.
- Sociedad Agrícola Virú, dedicated to agribusiness and based in Virú Province
- SEDALIB, water supply and sanitation company based in Trujillo city
- Caja Trujillo, banking company centered in Trujillo
- Cesar Vallejo University, based in Víctor Larco city

== Archaeology ==
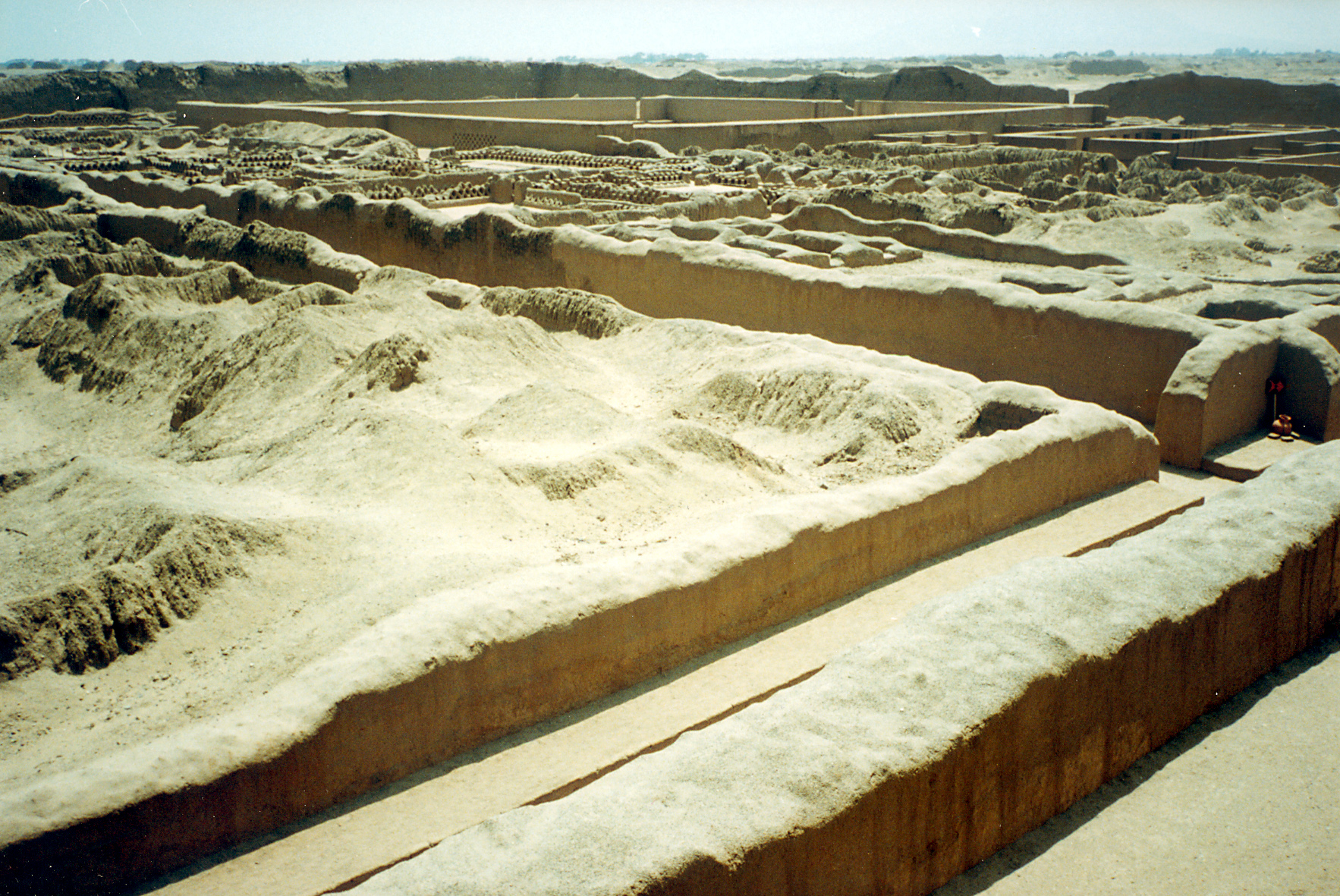
Chan Chan, the huge adobe town from Chimu time

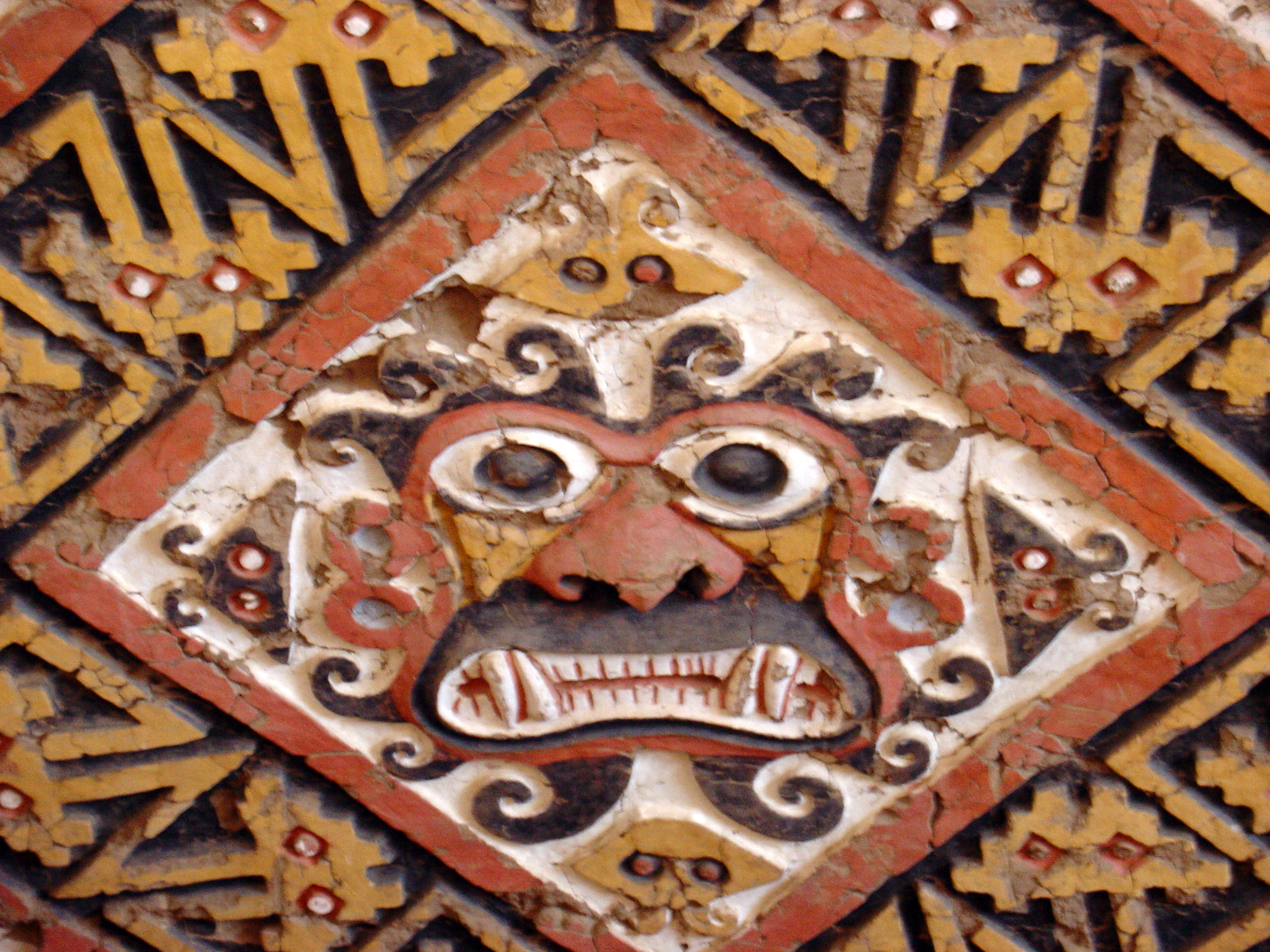
Aia Paec, Moche god

The coastal strip set the stage for the rise of many pre-Columbian cultures, such as the pre-Ceramic Huaca Prieta civilization, which is more than 5,000 years old & the Cupisnique, which is more than 3,000 years old. From 200 A.C., the first one to expand beyond its cradle was the Moche or Mochica culture. It was basically an agriculture and/or a warrior culture, which built countless temples and palaces such as the Sol (Sun), Luna (Moon), El Brujo & Cao Viejo, and other huacas. The Chimú culture emerged later and built its capital in Chan Chan, the largest pre-Columbian city in South America, & huacas like Esmeralda & Arco Iris (Rainbow). At its zenith, Chan Chan was home to 60,000 inhabitants who stubbornly resisted the expansion of the Inca Empire. These ancient cultures used irrigation canals and water reservoirs, which systems were increasingly better engineered and extensive over the years. The technological acumen of these sophisticated agricultural systems was carried into the Inca Empire, which surrounded the remnants of the prior cultures. The Spanish colonizers destroyed most of the agricultural works to more effectively establish political control and provide de facto slave labor from the displaced native agriculturalists.

The archaeological remains of Chan Chan, 6 km (3.7 mi) northeast of downtown Trujillo, are rather well-preserved despite being built out of adobe (mud bricks), largely because 1) dearth of rainfall and consequent erosion, and 2) lack of significant re-use of its construction materials (adobes do not respond easily to removal and transport and are relatively cheap to make on-site in current methods of construction).

During the Late Moche phase (AD 600 to 850), one of the largest power centers of the region was the fortified site of Cerro Chepén in the Jequetepeque Valley. It is located 3 km (1.9 mi) to the south of the site of San José de Moro.

Cerro Chepén has a sophisticated system of fortifications, and a dominant position on top of the hill, with many monumental buildings. Recent excavations at the site revealed that there was much internal conflict there that affected local communities.

=== Archaeological sites ===
Some of the archaeological sites in the Department of La Libertad are:

- Chan Chan
- El Brujo
- Huaca del Sol
- Huaca de la Luna
- Marcahuamachuco
- Pacatnamu
- Pirqa Pirqa
- San José de Moro
- Huaca Santa Clara
- Wiraquchapampa
- Archaeological Complex Caballo Muerto

== Places of interest ==
- Calipuy National Sanctuary

== Ecological regions ==
Regions of La Libertad

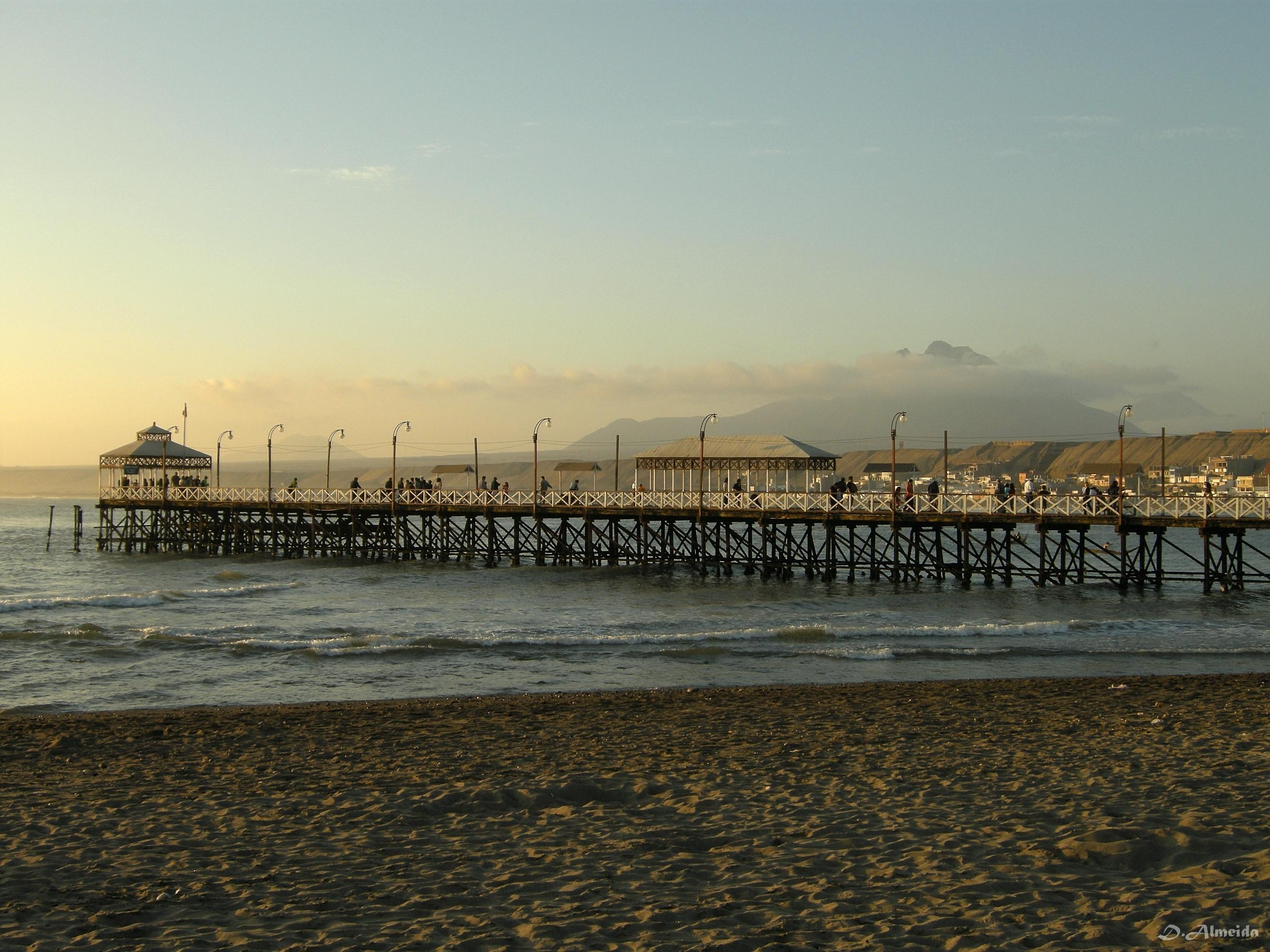
Litoral Trujillano; Huanchaco at Coast

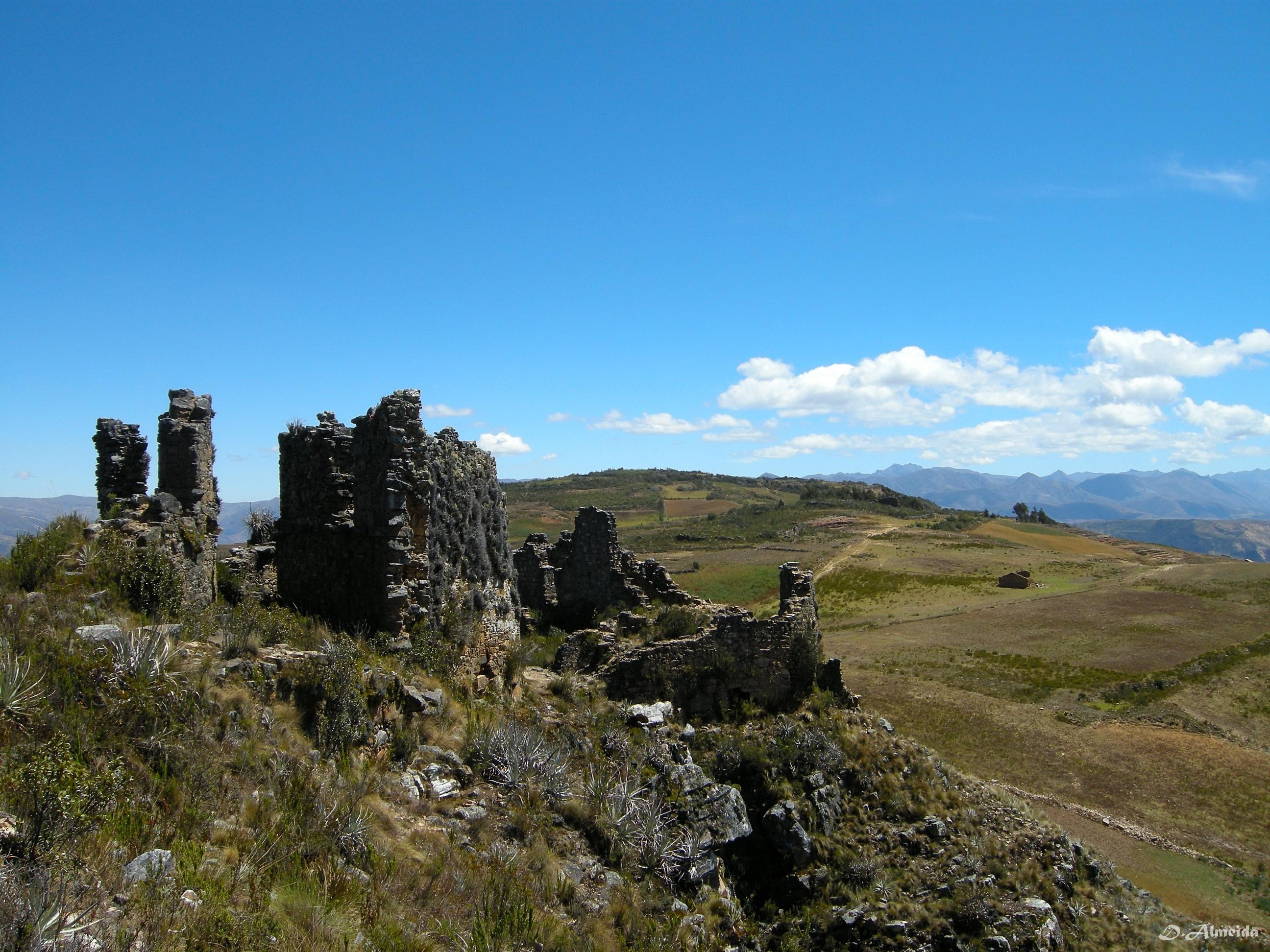
Andean landscape of Huamachuco; Sierra

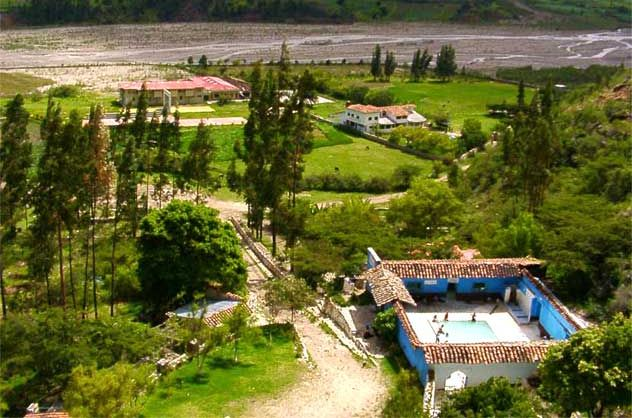
Yanasara, Andes de La Libertad; Sierra

== Water supply and sanitation ==
The public company for water supply and sanitation in La Libertad Region is SEDALIB which is formed by shareholders of municipalities of the Region.

== Culture ==
=== Festivals and events ===
- Spring Festival
- Marinera Festival
- International Calzaferia El Porvenir. It is a fair of footwear and in 2012 took place the 10th edition; it is held in El Porvenir city.
- Regional Fair of the Pineapple. It is held in the town of Poroto.
- Virgin of La Puerta. Patronal Feast; the celebration originated in 1664 when it placed the image of the Virgin at the entrance of Otuzco as precaution of the risk of a pirate raid. The main day is celebrated on December 15 every year and in 2012 the feast of Our Lady of the Gate was declared a National Cultural Heritage by the Peruvian government.
- Contradanza. Expression cultivated in Huamachuco city, in the villages Urpay, Shiracmaca and Culicanda. This dance in 2012 has been declared a National Cultural Heritage by the Peruvian government.

== See also ==
- Chimú culture
- Moche
- Cupisnique
- Marcahuamachuco
- 1970 Ancash earthquake
