= Chepén =

- City
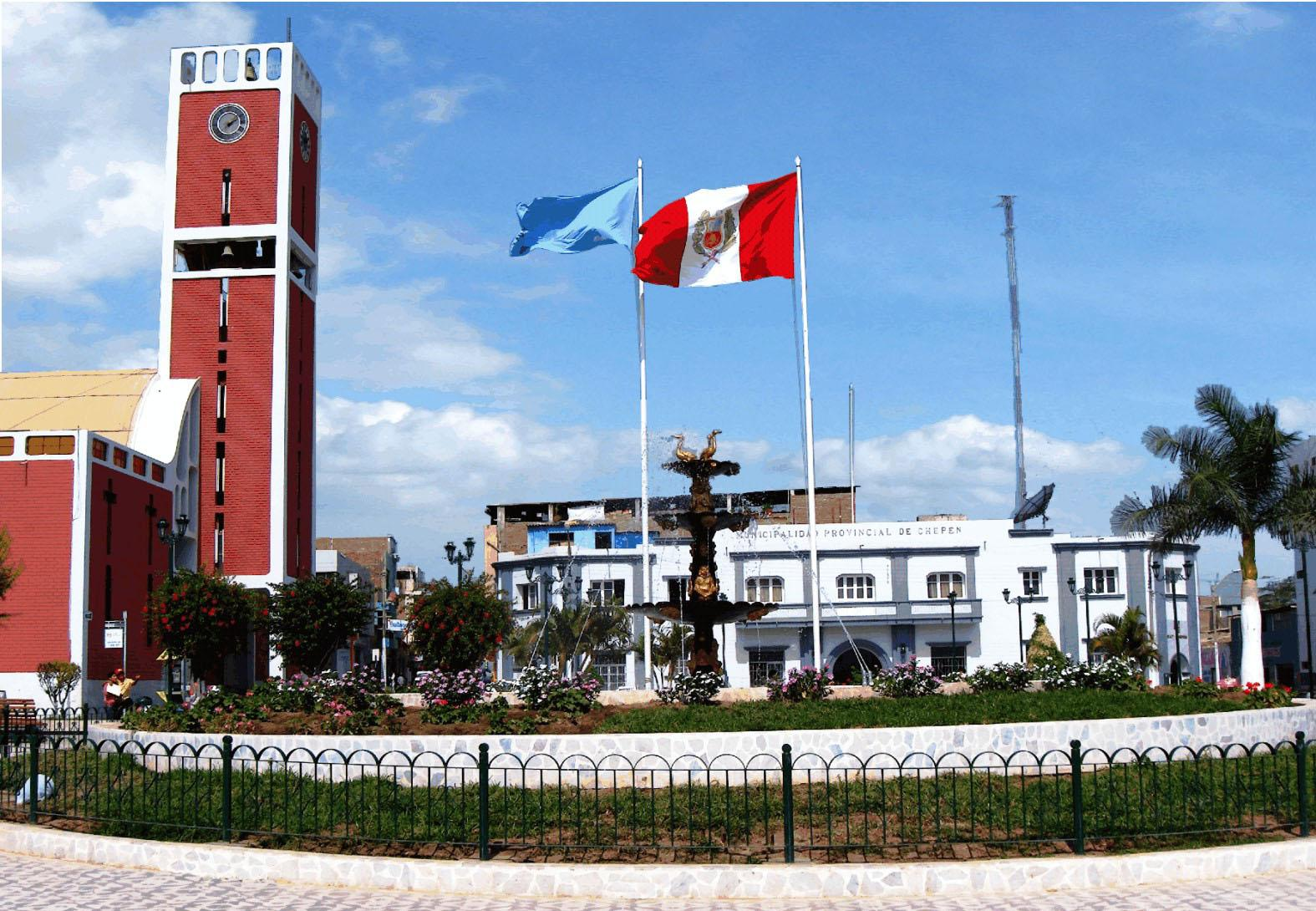
- Main square of Chepén

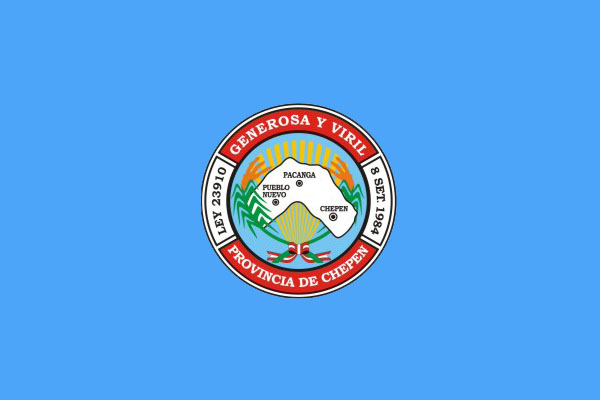
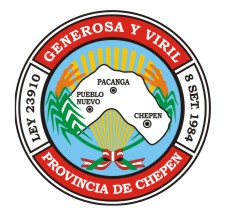
- Flag Seal
- Interactive map of Chepén
- Location within Peru
- Coordinates: 7°13′37.67″S 79°25′47.41″W
- Country: Peru
- Region: La Libertad
- Province: Chepén

Government
  - Mayor: Jose David Lias Ventura
- Elevation: 131 m (430 ft)

Population
  - Estimate (2015): 45,897
- Time zone: UTC-5 (PET)
- Website: Official Website

Chepén is a city of La Libertad Region and capital of the Chepén Province, in Peru. The city is a rice production center with the valleys of Chepén and Jequetepeque, and has an active trading with neighboring Guadalupe, Pacasmayo and San Pedro de Lloc and other towns. It has factories in industrial dyes, food and primary production.

== Tourism ==
- Chérrepe, is a beach of Chepén, La Libertad, Perú.

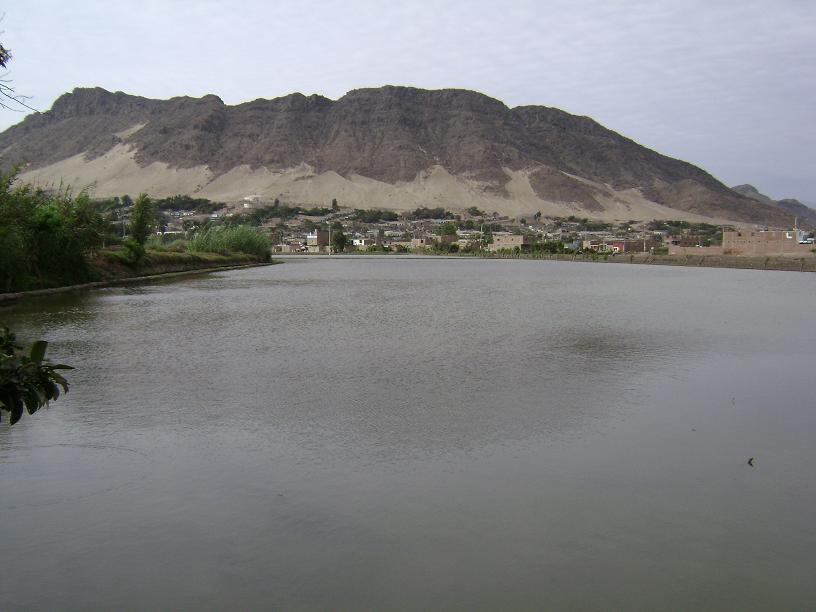
Partial view of Chepen

== Notable people ==
- Eduardo Gonzalez Viaña, writer.
- Ercila Rabínes de Terrones, founder of Ercila Rabínes de Terrones 180 school.
- Marcelina Astonitas Guanilo, fashion designer, designed all clothing for first Miss Universe from Peru in 1957 Gladys Rosa Zender among other Miss Peru participants, later on went to NYC to work in Fashion and Design. Currently retired and lives in Lima, Peru and NYC.
- Julia Wong Kcomt, writer and founder of the Poetry Festival of Chepén Chepén

== See also ==
- La Libertad Region
