= Pacasmayo =

- City
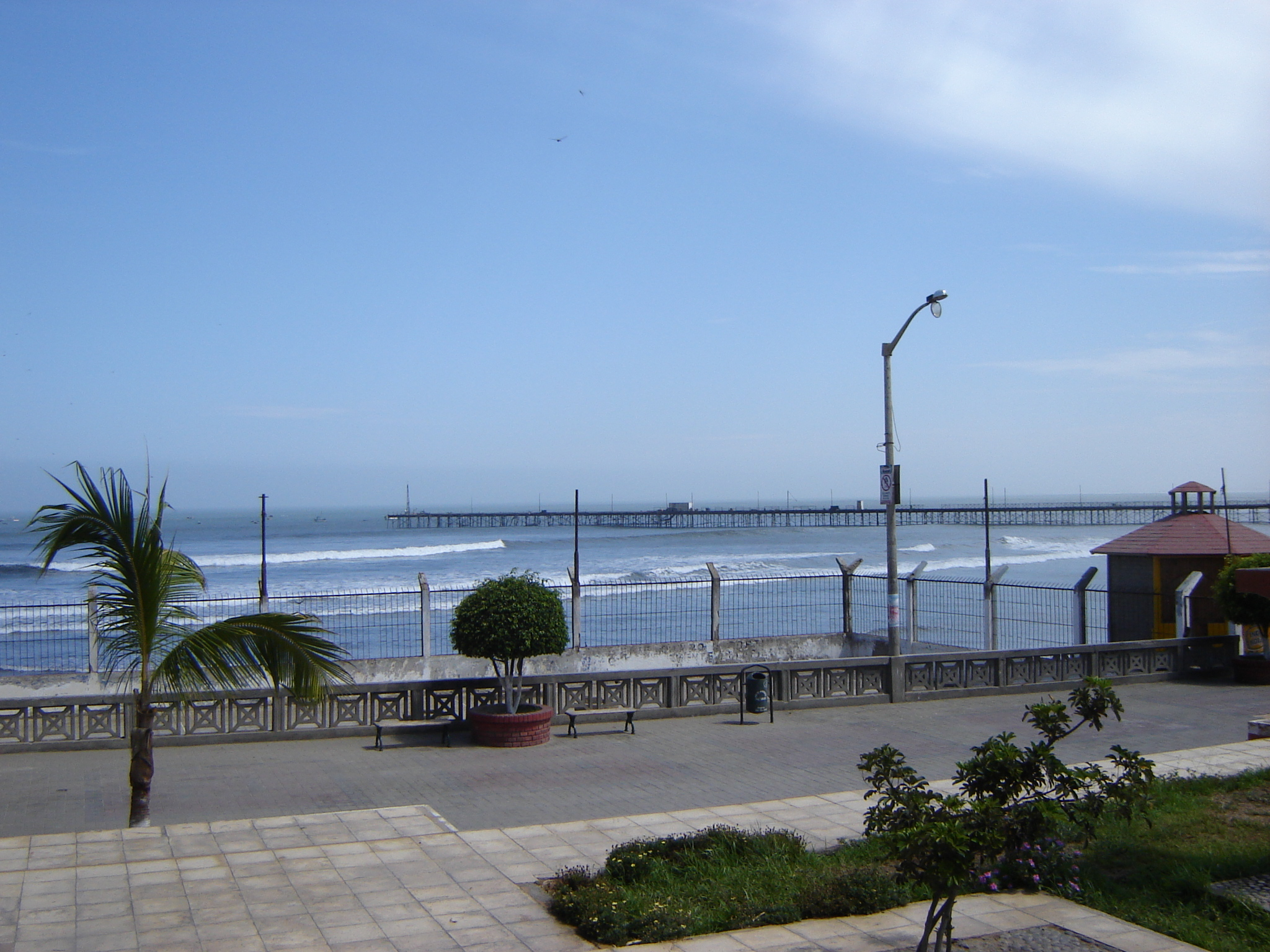
- Pacasmayo pier seen from shore

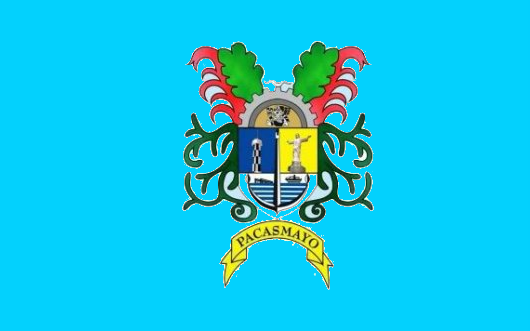
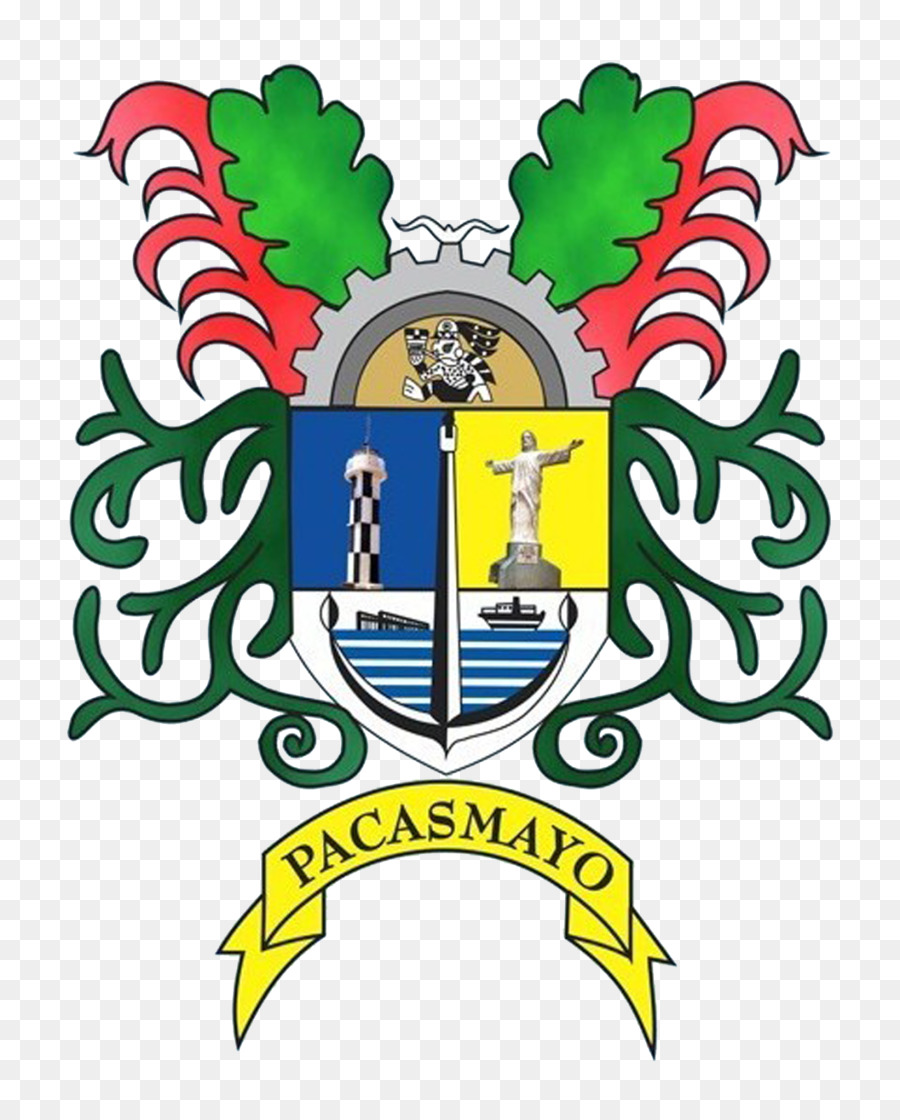
- Flag Seal
- Interactive map of Pacasmayo
- Location within Peru
- Coordinates: 7°24′1″S 79°34′12″W
- Country: Peru
- Region: La Libertad Region
- Province: Pacasmayo
- Established: 23 November 1864

Government
  - Mayor: Cesar Rodolfo Milla Manay

Area
  - Total: 30.84 km^{2} (11.91 sq mi)
- Elevation: 43 m (141 ft)

Population (2017)
  - Total: 28,959
  - Estimate (2015): 27,514
  - Density: 939.0/km^{2} (2,432/sq mi)
- Demonym: Pacasmayino/a
- Time zone: UTC-5 (PET)
- Website: Official Website

Pacasmayo is a city in Northern Peru, in the Pacasmayo province, La Libertad Region. It is located 108 km north of Trujillo city.

== Transportation ==
- Panamerican Highway, connects with north and south the country.
- Pacasmayo Port, connects to the world by the sea.

== Tourism ==
- Pacasmayo beach visited by surfers commonly.
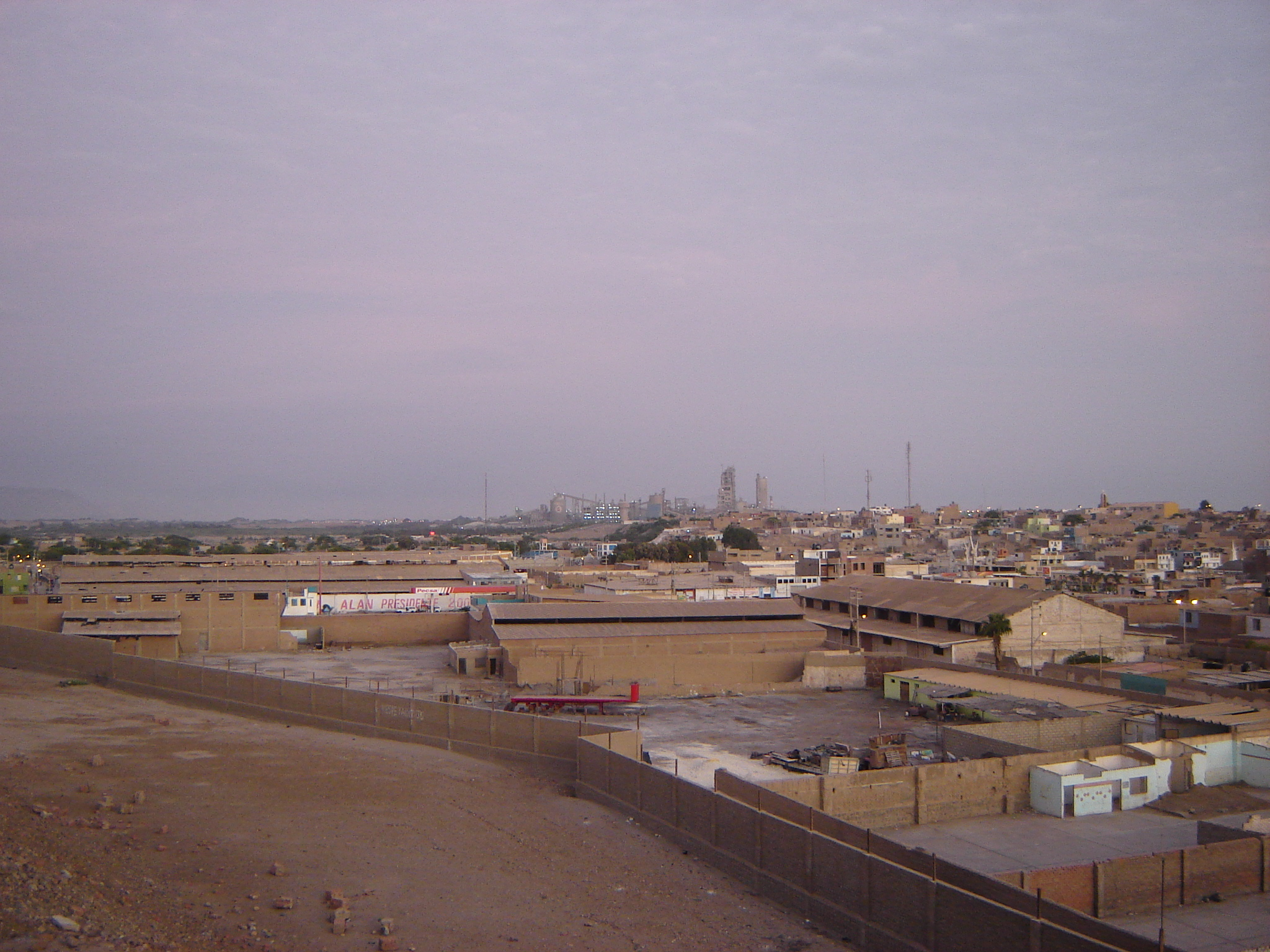
Pacasmayo overlook

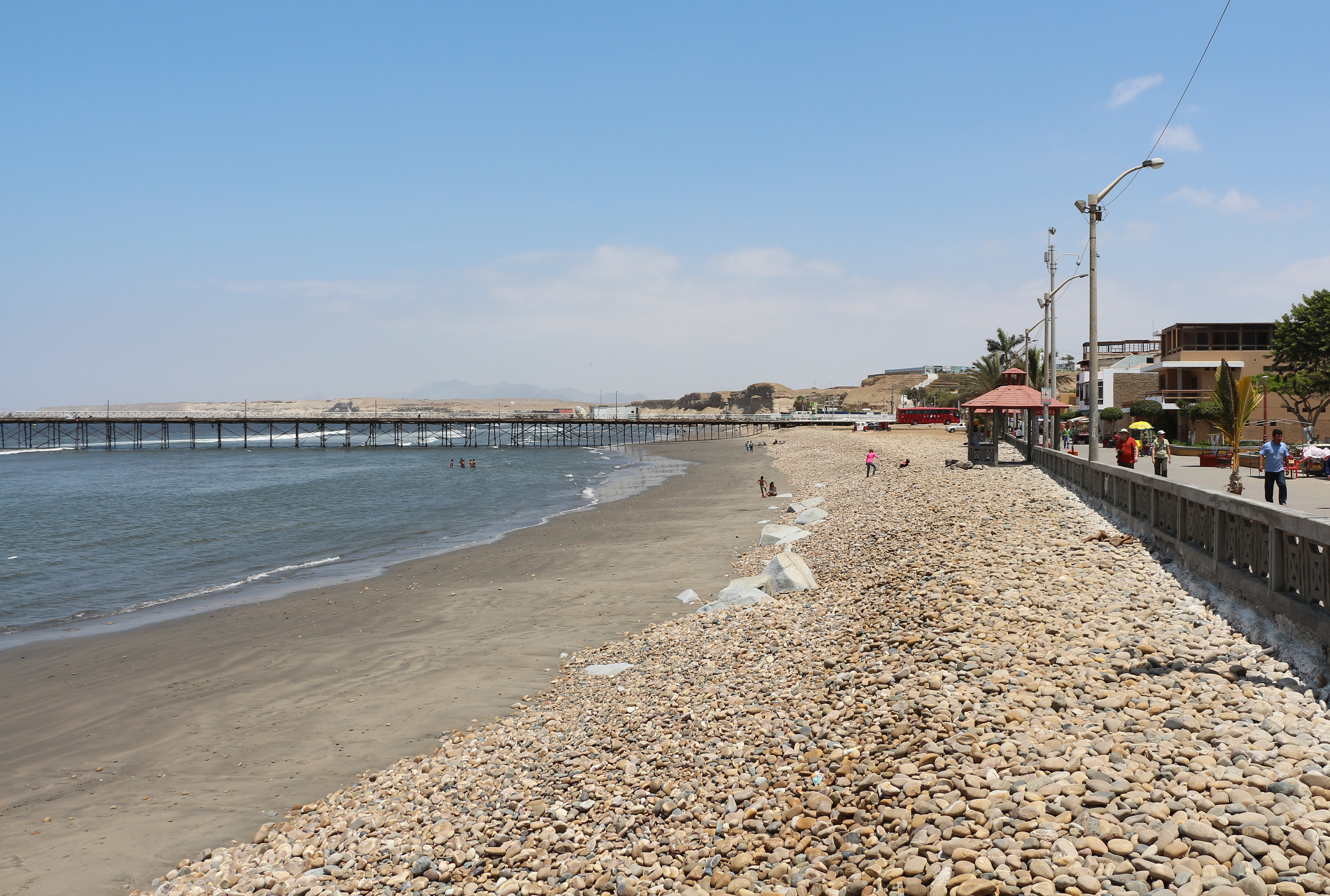
Pacasmayo Beach

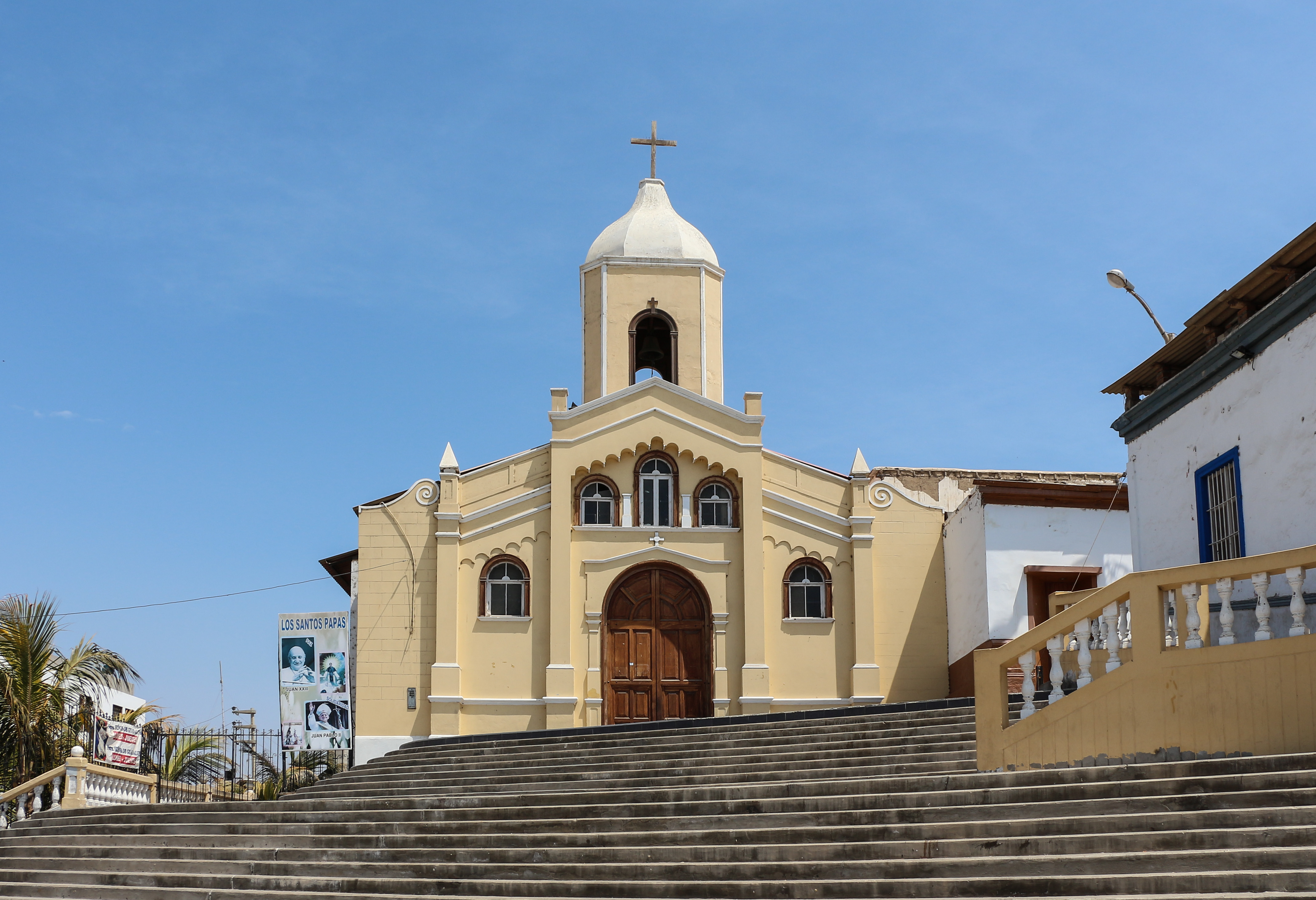
Notre-Dame of Guadalupe Church

== History ==
Pacasmayo has been inhabited for over 10,000 years by groups of people collecting their food from the sea. Since before anyone can remember, the beaches of "El Lorito", "El Techito" and "La Peña Larga" have provided food sources to populate Pacasmayo. With the available food from the sea and the forests in the arid mountains (close to the river Jequetepeque) which provides carob trees (or locust beans), wool, and diverse species of animals; Pacasmayo (or Pacasca Mayo in Quechuan) was chosen as a settling place for small tribal groups.

By order of Virrey Teodoro de Croix in the year 1775, the Spanish conquistadors founded Pacasmayo. Since that time it became an important landing for the Spanish crown. The year of 1871 began the construction of the Pacasmayo dock or "muelle de Pacasmayo" and the train Pacasmayo-Chilete, which turned into an important Peruvian coastal port. This work of engineering began the golden age of Pacasmayo which lasted until 1967, the year when the railway stopped running. Since that time, the commercial activity has decreased to the point where now the dock, just as the railway station, are historic monuments. They are evidence of a glorious past that brought with it an economic boom to the city.

The company “Cementos Pacasmayo SA” (Pacasmayo Concrete Inc.), which began in 1959, quickly became the new axis upon which the economy of the city developed. Its presence promoted the development of many economic services such as businesses that transport heavy loads, banks, and commercial stores. All depended on this central industry.

The coastal area, El Faro (The Lighthouse), has been a popular water-sport tourism destination since the end of the 20th century. Surfing, windsurfing, kiteboarding, and paddleboarding opportunities bring visitors from around the world.

== See also ==
- Pacasmayo Province
- La Libertad Region
- Colegio Italiano Antonio Raimondi
- Óscar Felipe Ventura
