= Santa Elena, Virú =

Santa Elena
- Location within Peru
- Coordinates: 08°25′54.80″S 78°49′57.16″W
- Country: Peru
- Region: La Libertad Region
- Province: Virú
- District: Virú

Government
  - Mayor: Roger Cruz Alarcón (2011 - 2014)
- Time zone: UTC-5 (PET)
- Website: Municipalidad de Viru

Santa Elena is a Peruvian village located in Virú District, in La Libertad Region. It is located some 45 km south of Trujillo city.

== Nearby places ==
- Puerto Morín
- Virú
- Chao
- Virú Valley

== See also ==
- Trujillo
- Historic Centre of Trujillo
- Chan Chan
- Puerto Chicama
- Chimú culture
- Pacasmayo beach
- Marcahuamachuco
- Wiracochapampa
- Salaverry
- Buenos Aires
- San Jose Festival
- Huanchaco
- Moche
- Víctor Larco Herrera District
- Vista Alegre
- Las Delicias beach
- La Libertad Region
- Trujillo Province, Peru
- Virú culture
- Lake Conache
- Marinera Festival
- Trujillo Spring Festival
- Wetlands of Huanchaco
