= Rafael Larco Hoyle =

Peruvian archaeologist (1901–1966)

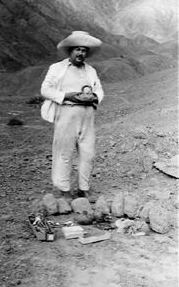
- Larco Hoyle at a 1935 excavation in Peru.
- Born: 18 May 1901; Chicama Valley
- Died: 23 October 1966 (aged 65); Lima
- Education: Cornell University
- Occupation: Archaeologist
- Father: Rafael Larco Herrera
- Relatives: Victor Larco Herrera (uncle)

Rafael Larco Hoyle (18 May 1901 in Chicama Valley, Peru – 23 October 1966, Lima) was a Peruvian archaeologist. Born in Peru, he was educated in the United States. He returned to Peru in 1923 and was involved in excavations of diverse pre-Columbian cultures. Building off of his father's collection and several purchases of his own, in 1926 he founded the Larco Museum in Lima. He is remembered for developing the first academic chronology of pre-Columbian cultures of Peru.

== Biography ==
Rafael Larco Hoyle was born on 18 May, 1901 in Peru's Chicama Valley. Raised at Chiclin, his family's estate, he was sent to school in Maryland, United States, at the age of twelve. He later entered Cornell University to study agricultural engineering.

By 1923, he returned to Peru to work on the family's sugar cane plantation. He explored the country and discovered ancient cultural patrimony on the north coast.

In 1925, Larco Hoyle's father, Rafael Larco Herrera acquired a collection of vases and other archaeological pieces from Alfredo Hoyle, his brother-in-law. There were approximately 600 ceramic pieces in all. The arrival of these objects ignited a collector's enthusiasm in Larco Hoyle. Soon after, Larco Herrera left his son in charge of the collection.

Larco Hoyle purchased two large collections: 8,000 pieces from Roa and 6,000 pieces from Carranza. He also purchased several small collections in the Chicama Valley, Trujillo, Virú, and Chimbote. Within a year, the collection had grown significantly and display cases were installed in a small house on the Chiclín estate. On July 28, 1926, Independence Day, the Rafael Larco Herrera Museum opened its doors to the public.

With a collection of approximately 30,000 pieces, Larco Hoyle began classifying it. Peruvian archaeology was in its infancy and Larco Hoyle realized many typologies were yet to be recognized. He set out to correct that and approached archaeological research academically. During the 1930s, he discovered many distinct Peruvian cultures such as Viru, Salinar, Cupisnique, and Lambayeque. The focus of his research became the Mochica culture. In 1946, Larco Hoyle, director of the Larco Museum, developed the first Peruvian chronology of ancient cultures, one that has remained current.

He died on 23 October, 1966 in Lima.

== Archaeological contributions ==
- Discovery of the archeological site of Cupisnique (1933).
- Discovery of the Virú culture in the cemeteries of Pampa de los Cocos and Pampa de Moche (1933).
- Discovery of Queneto and its ceramics (1934).
- Discovery of the pre- Cupisnique ceramics (1939).
- Discovery of the Cupisnique culture (1939).
- Discovery of the cemeteries containing ceramics called Cupisnique de Santa Ana and the culture of the same name (1939).
- Discovery of the cemeteries containing ceramics called Cupisnique de Santa Ana and the culture of the same name (1939).
- Discovery of tombs with hybrid ceramics Mochica - Virú (1940).
- Discovery of the Salinar culture (1941).
- Opening of the first tomb in the valley of Virú and find of the hybrid cemeteries called by him Virú - Cupisnique.
- Discovery of the hybrid vases Salinar - Cupisnique in the valley of Virú.
- Discovery of lithic tools used by the hunters in the Pre- Ceramics Age (pampas of Paiján and Cupisnique).
- Find of the vases of the Virú culture in the valleys of Chicama, Santa Catalina, Santa, Pacasmayo, Lambayeque and Piura.
- Discovery of the Virú vases, with positive ornamentation and called by him Virú of Chicama.
- Discovery of the Pacopampa ruins from the Evolutionary Age and of tools of the culture that existed there.
- Discovery of the pre - Mochica phase, called Complex Mochica or Initial Mochica.
- Find of tombs with orange vases and its relation with Virú vases, previous to Mochica.
- Find of the superimposed tombs and stratifications that allowed him to sort the five Mochica periods.
- Discovery of Barbacoa of Cupisnique, Salinar, Virú and Mochica superimposed tombs that resulted in the determination, for the first time, of the chronological order of the pre - Mochica cultures.
- Discovery of the fact that the Huari culture, called Tiahuanaco, spread all over the Peruvian territory and that its center was not Tiahuanaco but Huari in Ayacucho.
- Discovery and declaration of the existence of the Lambayeque culture which is sorted into two periods : Lambayeque I and II, and the Huari - Lambayeque culture, distinguishing the Chimú culture from the Lambayeque culture.
- Explanation of why it was not found the Middle Chimú, largely searched by the American archeologists proving that the Chimú culture is the result of the fusion of Mochica, Lambayeque and Huari cultural elements.
- Classification, for the first time, of what nowadays is called Chimú - Inca ceramics, distinguishing it from the Chimú ceramics.
- Discovery of ceramics of Incaic shapes with Spanish glaze.
- Discovery of the fact that the culture called Recuay or Callejón de Huaylas had its center in the valley of Santa and not in the mountains, as it was thought.
- Finds, for the first time, of Santa ceramics in the valleys of Chao and Virú.
- Discovery of the fact that the center of the italic ceramics - that some considered Chimú - was the Lambayeque department. He named and described it.
- Determination of the sequence of the adobes in the constructions, beginning with the Cupisnique conic sections, the Salinar spherical skullcaps and Mochica and Chimú types of rectangular sections.
- Discovery of the fact that the Chimú settlers used and worked with bricks.
- Statement of the deity evolution, from the feline to the God - Man, with large canines and wrinkled face that is represented in the Peak Age.
- Discovery of the Mochica writing after its spread all over the Peruvian territory.
- Statement that the Maya and Mochica writings have the same origins.
- Discovery of the Pre - Ceramics Age in Paracas.
- Division of the study on the evolution of the Peruvian cultures into seven ages : Pre -Ceramics, Initial Age of the Ceramics, Evolutionary, Peak, Fusional, Imperial and Conquest.
- Classification of the Huari ceramics into Huari A, Huari B and Huari C which represents the total decline of this culture.
- Demonstration, for the first time, of the charts of the different coast valleys and of the main mountain centers classifying them by ages and periods and including within them the cultures settled in those places.
- Discovery of the fact that the Mochicas used lead and iron.
- Discovery of the fact that the Vicus silvered the copper and gilded it on its outside part.
- Discovery of the fact that the Chimú silvered the copper.
- Statement that the origins of Mochica I are placed in Vicus.
- Sorting, for the first time, of the Mochica and other cultures funerary ceramics by subject and series.
- Discovery of the fact that the circumcision was practiced by the ancient Mochicas.
- Verification of the existence of the syphilis in the ancient Peru.
- Statement, for the first time, that there was not a Chavín empire but a decorative style used by other cultures of the Evolutionary or Formative Age.
- Find of white over red Salinar vases in Piura, Chiclayo, Pacasmayo, Valley of Chicama, Santa Catalina, Virú, Chao, Santa and Nazca.
- Statement of the complete chronology pertaining to the cultures in the north of Peru which is included in his book CRONOLOGÍA ARQUEOLÓGICA DEL NORTE (ARCHEOLOGICAL CHRONOLOGY OF THE NORTH), published in 1948. The cultural sequence has been verified by foreign groups of archeologists.
- Statement, for the first time, that the incised ceramics called Chavín cannot be considered a horizon because in that way the vases with negative ornamentation and the cream over red vases would have to be considered horizons as well

== Bibliography ==
- Los Mochicas, Vol. I: Capítulo I: Origen y evolución de los agregados sociales de la Costa del Perú. Capítulo. II: Geografía. Lima (Perú), 1938.
- Los Mochicas, Vol. II: Capítulos III, IV, V, y VI: La raza, la lengua, la escritura y el gobierno. Lima (Perú), 1940.
- Los Cupisniques: Trabajo presentado à la XXVII reunión del Congreso Internacional de Americanistas de Lima. Casa editora "La Crónica" y "Variedades" S.A. Lima (Perú), 1941.
- La Escritura Mochica Sobre Pallares: Extracto de la Revista Geográfica Americana. Buenos Aires (Argentina), 1942.
- La Escritura Sobre Pallares: Extracto de la Revista Geográfica Americana. Buenos Aires (Argentina), 1943.
- Cultura Salinar: Síntesis monográfica. Buenos Aires (Argentina), 1944.
- La Escritura Peruana Sobre Pallares: Ed. de las Relaciones de la Sociedad Argentina de Antropología. Buenos Aires (Argentina), 1944.
- La Escritura Peruana Pre-Incana: Sobretiro de "El México Antiguo". Revista Internacional de Arqueología, Etnología, Folklore, Pre-Historia, Historia Antigua y Lingüística. México D.F., 1944.
- La Cultura Virú: Monografía. Buenos Aires (Argentina), 1945.
- Los Mochicas: (Pre-Chimú, de Uhle, y Early Chimú, de Kroeber). Síntesis monográfica. Buenos Aires (Argentina), 1945.
- A Culture Sequence for the North Coast of Peru: En Handbook South American Indians. Washington D.C., 1946.
- Los Cupisniques: Síntesis monográfica. Buenos Aires (Argentina), 1945.
- Cronología Arqueológica del Norte del Perú. Buenos Aires (Argentina), 1948.
- La Cultura Santa, 1962.
- La Divinidad Felínica-Lambayeque, 1962.
- Las Épocas Peruanas, 1963.
- La Cultura Vicús, 1965.
- Museo Rafael Larco Herrera, 1965.
- Checan: Ediciones Nagel. Ginebra (Suiza), 1965.
