= Guadalupito =

- Town
- Location within Peru
- Coordinates: 8°57′4.27″S 78°37′29.51″W
- Country: Peru
- Region: La Libertad
- Province: Virú
- District: Guadalupito
- Time zone: UTC-5 (PET)

Guadalupito is a town in Northern Peru, capital of the district of Guadalupito in the region La Libertad. This town is located about 118 km south of Trujillo city and is primarily an agricultural center in the Chao Valley.

== See also ==
- Chavimochic
- Virú Valley
- Virú
- Moche valley
- Chao
