= Chiquitoy =

- Town
- Location within Peru
- Coordinates: 7°44′1.13″S 79°0′25.02″W
- Country: Peru
- Region: La Libertad
- Province: Ascope
- District: Santiago de Cao
- Time zone: UTC-5 (PET)

Chiquitoy is a town in Santiago de Cao district of Ascope Province in the region La Libertad, in Northern Peru. It is located some 38 km northwest of Trujillo city in the agricultural Chicama Valley.

== See also ==
- Ascope Province
- Chavimochic
- Virú Valley
- Virú
- Moche valley
