= Roma, Peru =

Roma
- Town
- Location within Peru
- Coordinates: 7°45′53.70″S 79°8′49.21″W
- Country: Peru
- Region: La Libertad
- Province: Ascope
- District: Casa Grande
- Time zone: UTC-5 (PET)

Roma is a town in the Casa Grande District of Ascope Province of the region La Libertad Region of Peru. It is located some 44 km north of Trujillo city in the agricultural Chicama Valley.

== See also ==
- Ascope Province
- Chavimochic
- Virú Valley
- Virú
- Moche valley
