= Sausal, Peru =

Sausal
- Town
- Location within Peru
- Coordinates: 7°44′1.13″S 79°0′25.02″W
- Country: Peru
- Region: La Libertad
- Province: Ascope
- District: Chicama

Population (2021)
  - Total: 5,138
- Time zone: UTC-5 (PET)

Sausal is a town in Northern Peru in Chicama District of Ascope Province in the region La Libertad. This town is located some 65 km north of Trujillo in the agricultural Chicama Valley.

== See also ==
- Ascope Province
- Chavimochic
- Virú Valley
- Virú
- Moche valley
