= Magdalena de Cao =

- Town
- Location within Peru
- Coordinates: 7°52′38.44″S 79°17′40.26″W
- Country: Peru
- Region: La Libertad
- Province: Ascope
- District: Magdalena de Cao

Population
  - Total: 2,669
- Time zone: UTC-5 (PET)

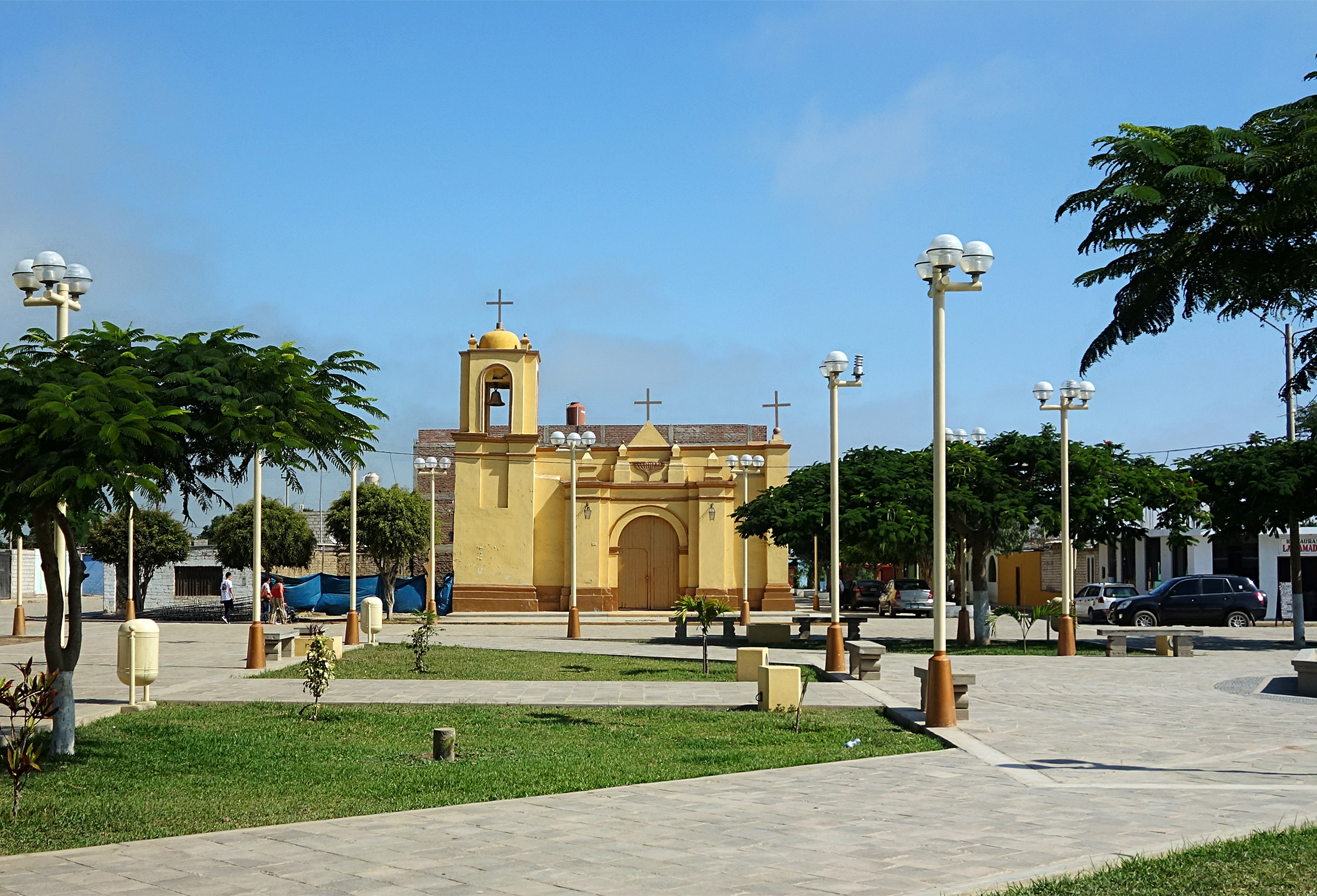
The Plaza de Armas of Magdalena de Cao, Peru.

Magdalena de Cao is a town in Northern Peru, capital of the district Magdalena de Cao of Ascope Province in the region La Libertad. This town is located some 56 km northwest of Trujillo city in the agricultural Chicama Valley.

== See also ==
- Paiján culture
- Ascope Province
- Chavimochic
- Virú Valley
- Virú
- Moche valley
