= Santiago de Cao =

- Town
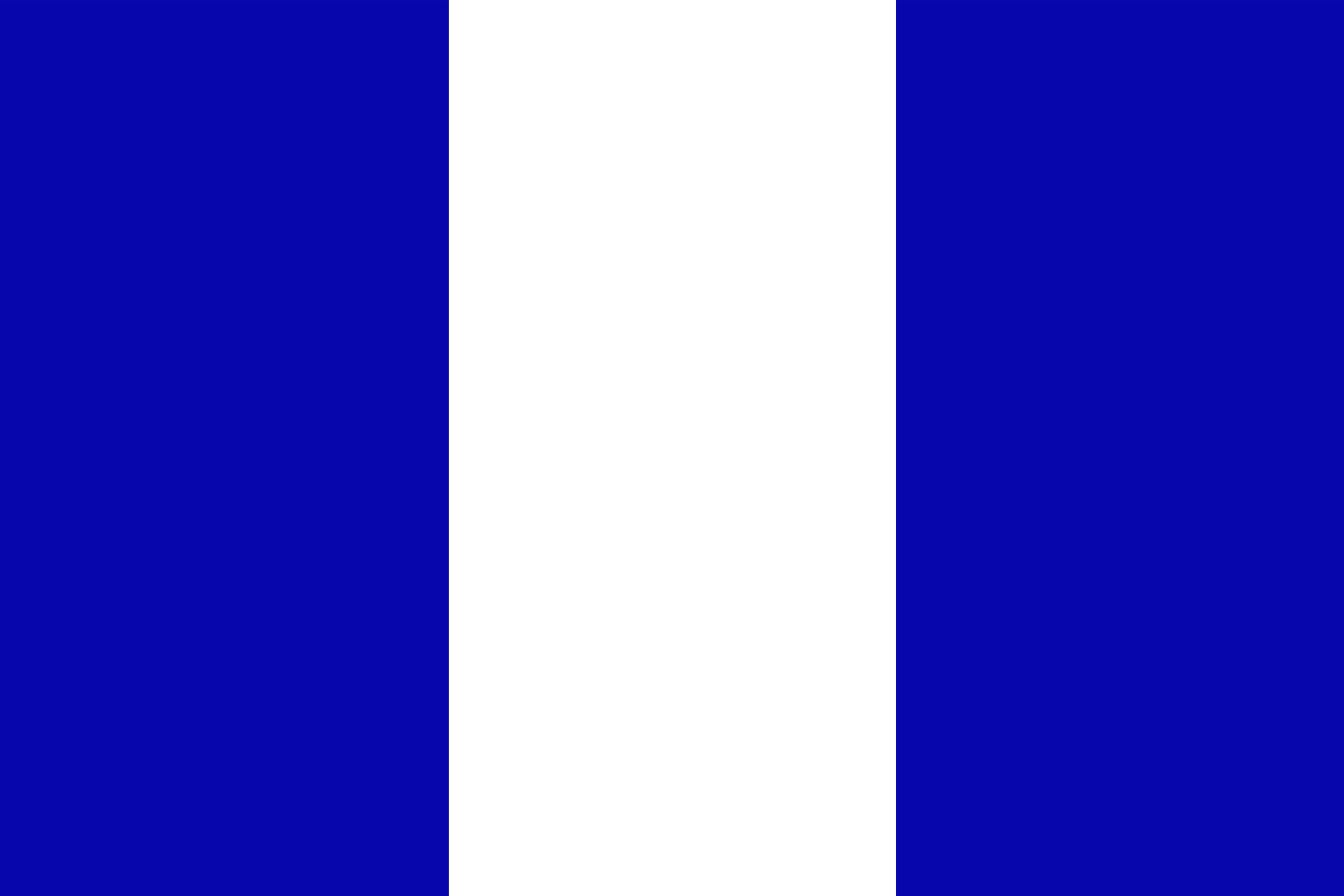
- Flag Seal

- Location within Peru
- Coordinates: 7°57′33.21″S 79°14′30.81″W
- Country: Peru
- Region: La Libertad
- Province: Ascope
- District: Santiago de Cao
- Time zone: UTC-5 (PET)

Santiago de Cao is a town in Northern Peru, capital of the district Santiago de Cao of Ascope Province in the region La Libertad. This town is located some 33 km northwest of Trujillo city in the agricultural Chicama Valley.

== See also ==
- Paiján culture
- Ascope Province
- Chavimochic
- Virú Valley
- Virú
- Moche valley
