= Chicama =

- Town
- Location within Peru
- Coordinates: 7°50′40″S 79°08′43″W
- Country: Peru
- Region: La Libertad
- Province: Ascope
- District: Chicama
- Time zone: UTC-5 (PET)

Chicama is a town in Northern Peru, capital of the district of Chicama of Ascope Province in the region La Libertad. This town is located beside the Pan-American Highway some 33 km north of Trujillo city in the agricultural Chicama Valley.

== See also ==
- Ascope Province
- Puerto Chicama
- Chavimochic
- Virú Valley
- Virú
- Valley of Moche
- Huanchaco

== See also ==
- Chicama Waves
