= Paiján =

- Town
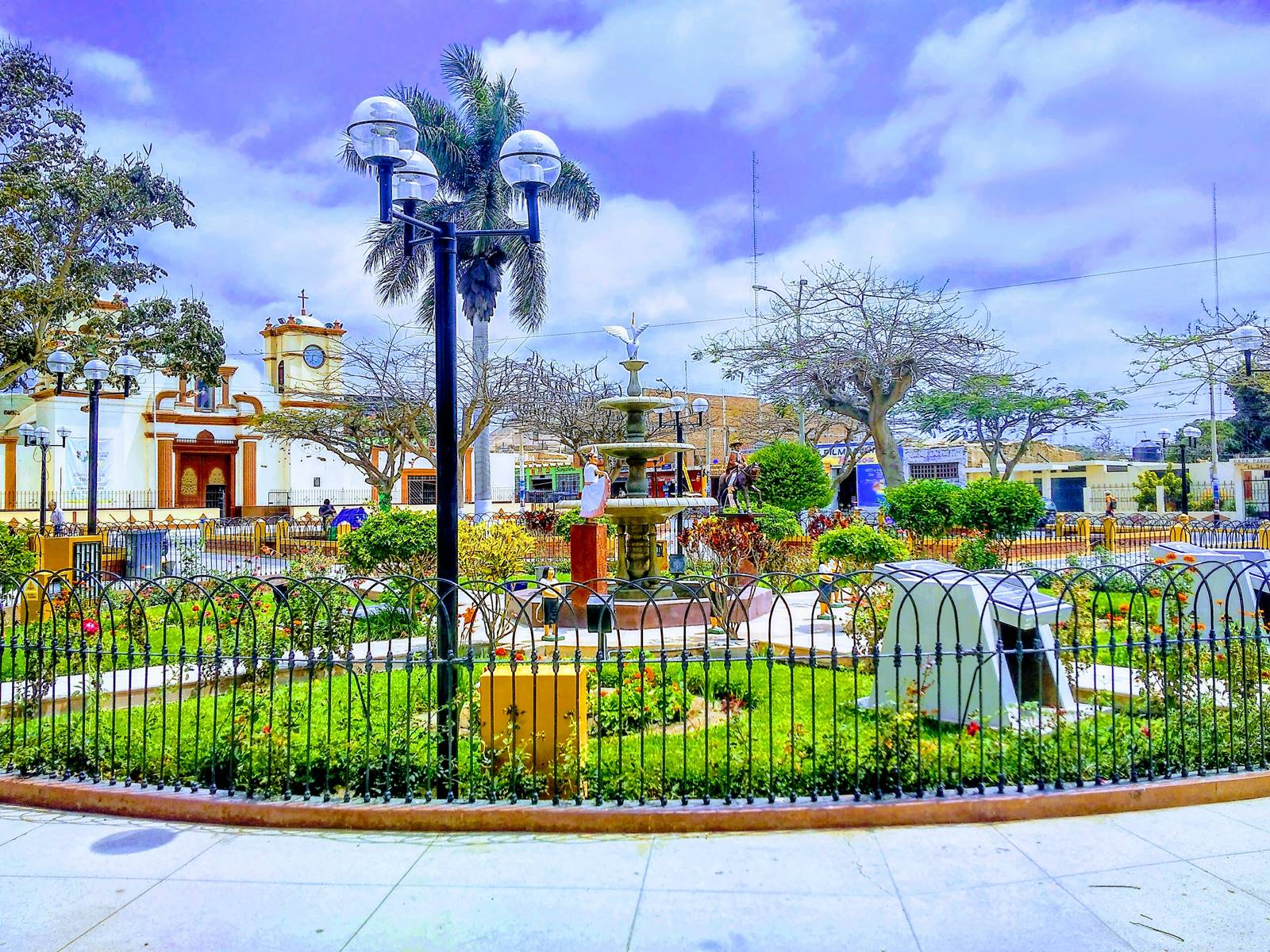
- Plaza de Armas of Paijan

- Location within Peru
- Coordinates: 7°43′52.14″S 79°18′13.95″W
- Country: Peru
- Region: La Libertad
- Province: Ascope
- District: Paiján

Government
  - Mayor: Daniel Alva Iglesias
- Time zone: UTC-5 (PET)
- UBIGEO: 130205

Paiján is a town in Northern Peru, capital of the district of Paiján of Ascope Province in the region La Libertad. This town is located beside the Pan-American Highway some 54 km north of Trujillo city in the agricultural Chicama Valley.

== See also ==
- Paiján culture
- Ascope Province
- Chavimochic
- Virú Valley
- Virú
- Moche valley
