= Chicama District =

District in La Libertad, Peru

Chicama
- District
- Coat of arms
- Interactive map of Chicama
- Country: Peru
- Region: La libertad
- Province: Ascope
- Founded: January 2, 1857
- Capital: Chicama

Government
  - Mayor: DAVID VALDERRAMA PAREDES

Area
  - Total: 895.45 km^{2} (345.74 sq mi)
- Elevation: 125 m (410 ft)

Population (2005 census)
  - Total: 15,785
  - Density: 17.628/km^{2} (45.656/sq mi)
- Time zone: UTC-5 (PET)
- UBIGEO: 130202
- Website: munichicama.gob.pe

Chicama District is one of the districts of the Ascope Province in the La Libertad Region in Peru.

== Localities ==
- Chiclín
- Sausal

== See also ==
- Chavimochic
- Chicama Valley
- Chicama
- Puerto Chicama
