= Chiclín =

- Town
- Location within Peru
- Coordinates: 7°50′8.78″S 79°9′40.05″W
- Country: Peru
- Region: La Libertad
- Province: Ascope
- District: Chicama
- Time zone: UTC-5 (PET)

Chiclín is a town in Northern Peru in Chicama District of Ascope Province in the region La Libertad. This town is located next to the Pan-American Highway some 35 km north of Trujillo in the agricultural Chicama Valley.

== History ==
At the start of the 20th century, Rafael Larco Herrera wanted to transform hacienda Chiclín into a utopia. The project was challenged by Alfonso Ugarte de Chiclín Football Club.

== See also ==
- Ascope Province
- Chavimochic
- Virú Valley
- Virú
- Moche valley
