= Chocope =

- Town
- Location within Peru
- Coordinates: 7°47′30.46″S 79°13′22.10″W
- Country: Peru
- Region: La Libertad
- Province: Ascope
- District: Chocope
- Time zone: UTC-5 (PET)

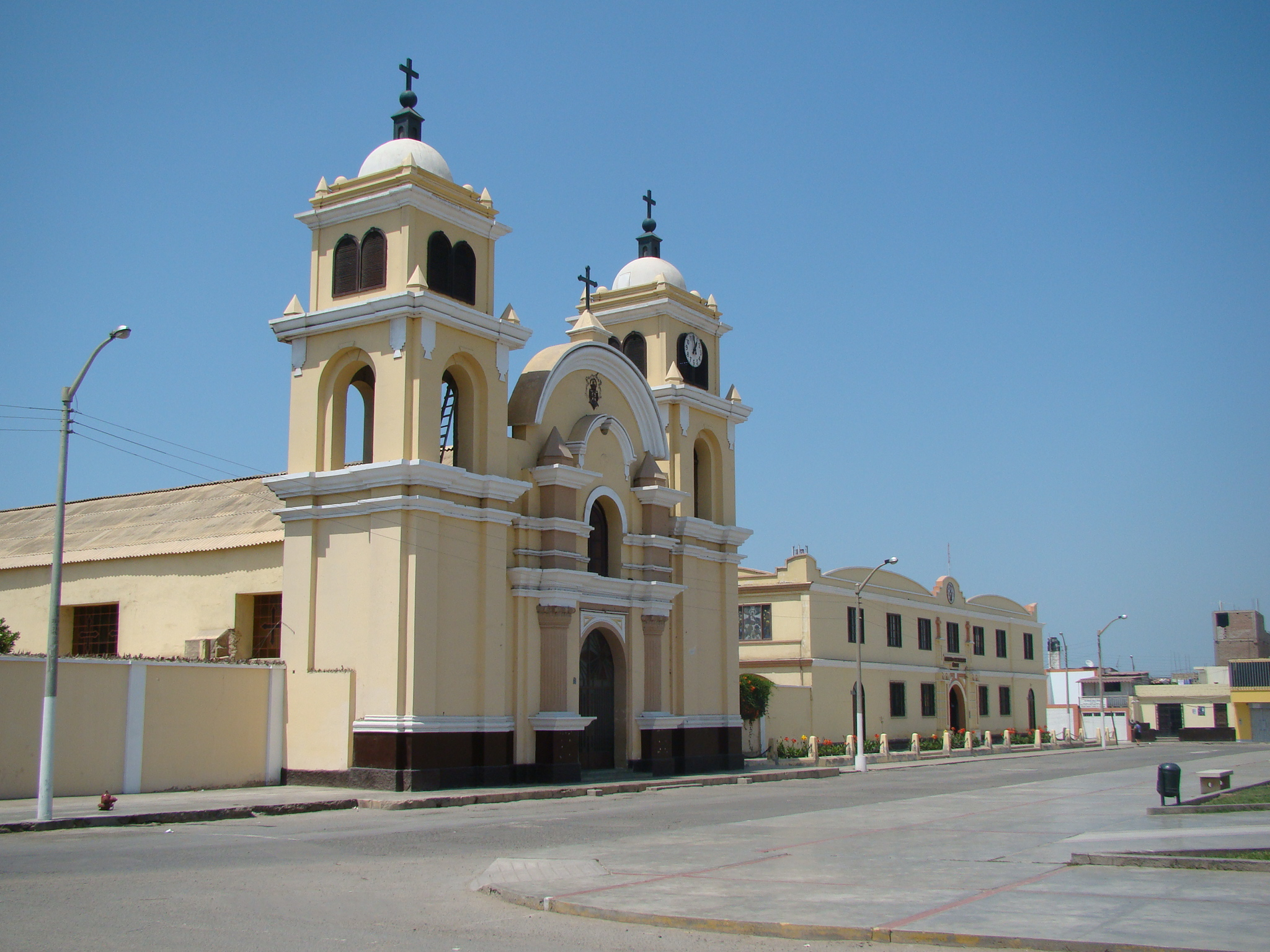

Chocope is a town in Northern Peru, capital of the district of Chocope in the region La Libertad. This town is located beside the Pan-American Highway some 45 km north of Trujillo city in the agricultural Chicama Valley. The town can be used as a bus connection when travelling from Trujillo to El Brujo.

== See also ==
- Ascope Province
- Chavimochic
- Virú Valley
- Virú
- Moche valley
