= Casa Grande (disambiguation) =

Casa Grande is a city in the U.S. state of Arizona.

Casa Grande may refer to:

== Places ==
=== Australia ===
- Casa Grande, Mount Isa, a heritage-listed house in Queensland

=== Brazil ===
- Casa Grande, Minas Gerais, a municipality in the state of Minas Gerais
- Casa grande (sugar plantation), the home of the owner of a sugar plantation in Brazilian history

=== Mexico ===
- Casas Grandes Municipality in Chihuahua, Mexico
  - Casas Grandes, an architectural zone in the municipality
- Nuevo Casas Grandes, another municipality in the state of Chihuahua
- Casa Grande (museum), an old ranch in the state of Veracruz, home of Lucía Zárate

=== Peru ===
- Casa Grande, Peru, a city in the Casa Grande District, in the Ascope Province of La Libertad Region

=== United States ===
- Casa Grande Ruins National Monument, a national monument outside Coolidge, Arizona
- Casa Grande, Pasadena, California
- Casa Grande Peak, a mountain in Texas

== Other ==
- casa-grande, Brazilian plantation estates
- Casa Grande Municipal Airport, a general aviation airport in Casa Grande, Arizona
- Casa Grande High School, a secondary school in Petaluma, California
- Casa Grande (soil), the state soil of Arizona
- The Great House (film) (La casa grande), a 1975 Spanish drama film
- Casa Grande, a 2014 Brazilian film starring Marcello Novaes
- USS Casa Grande (LSD-13)
- Casa Grande-class dock landing ship
- Casagrande, a surname
- The Casagrandes, a Nickelodeon TV series

== See also ==
- Casa Grande Hotel (disambiguation)
- Casa (disambiguation)
- Grande (disambiguation)
- Grand (disambiguation)
