= Azul Rojas Marín et al. v. Peru =

International human rights case

- Court: Inter-American Court of Human Rights
- Decided: 12 March 2020

Court membership
- Judges sitting: Elizabeth Odio Benito L. Patricio Pazmiño Freire Humberto Antonio Sierra Porto Eduardo Ferrer Mac-Gregor Poisot Eugenio Raúl Zaffaroni Ricardo Pérez Manrique

Azul Rojas Marín et al. v. Peru (Series C No. 402) is an international human rights case decided by the Inter-American Court of Human Rights (IACtHR) on 12 March 2020. The Court ruled that the state of Peru was internationally responsible for the arbitrary detention, physical abuse, and sexual torture of Azul Rojas Marín, (Note: In this Hispanic American name, the first or paternal surname is Rojas and the second or maternal family name is Marín.) a transgender Peruvian woman, by state law enforcement officers in 2008. The ruling represented the first time an international court explicitly recognized sexual violence committed by state agents against an LGBTQ+ individual as an act of discriminatory torture.

== Background ==
Half an hour after midnight on 25 February 2008, Azul Rojas Marín—who at the time of the events identified as a gay man and later transitioned and identified as a transgender woman—was approached by patrolling officers of the National Police of Peru on her way home. After an exchange of words, the officers left, returning a few minutes later. After taking Rojas Marín's information, the officers, alongside a member of the municipal security force (Serenazgo), beat her, insulted her, and forced her into a police vehicle before bringing her to the Casa Grande police station.

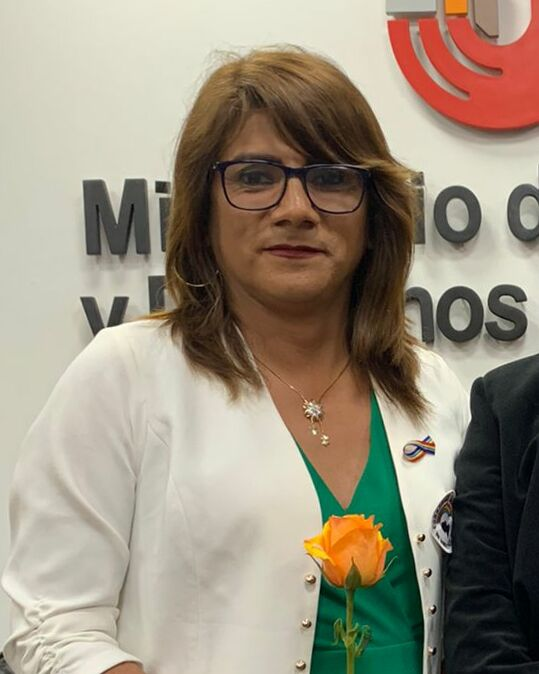
Azul Rojas in 2022

Rojas was held in detention for around five hours. As detailed in court proceedings, during her captivity she was stripped naked, repeatedly beaten, and anally raped twice with a baton by officers, accompanied by homophobic insults. She was released at 6 AM the following morning without the creation of any formal record of her detention.

== Investigation and legal proceedings ==
=== Domestic litigation ===
Later the same day, Rojas attempted to report the incident to the Casa Grande police office, but was ignored. Two days later, on 27 February 2008, she filed a formal criminal complaint; a month later, the Prosecutor's Office opened an investigation against the officers of that police station for the crime of sexual assault. On 2 April, three officers were charged with the crimes of rape and abuse of authority. The Prosecutor's Office rejected the request to include the crime of torture on 16 June, arguing that the state agents did not have the specific intent to extract information or a confession. Rojas appealed this decision, but in August 2008 the First Superior Criminal Prosecutor of La Libertad Judicial District declared the appeal without grounds.

During the investigation, a state prosecutor allowed the perpetrating officers to mock Rojas during a crime-scene reconstruction. A prosecutor was also present during the medical examination without her consent, and made comments to influence the doctor's findings. In January 2009, the Peruvian justice system ordered the case to be closed.

=== International litigation ===
Following the closure of the domestic case, on 15 April 2009 the human rights organizations REDRESS, PROMSEX, and the National Human Rights Coordinator collectively presented a petition before the Inter-American Commission on Human Rights (IACHR) on behalf of Azul Rojas and her mother. On 6 November 2014 the Commission approved the Admissibility Report, in which it concluded that the request was admissible, and on 24 February 2018 the Commission approved Merits Report No. 24/18, which reached a series of conclusions and formulated several recommendations to the state of Peru. The state was notified on 22 March with a two month deadline to report on its compliance with the recommendations.

The Commission submitted the case to the Inter-American Court of Human Rights (IACtHR) in August 2018. It was the first time the IACtHR considered a case specifically concerning targeted violence against an LGBTQ+ individual.

=== Inter-American Court ruling ===
On 12 March 2020, the Inter-American Court of Human Rights condemned the Republic of Peru for violating the fundamental rights of Azul Rojas Marín, concluding that the actions taken against her constituted torture and a hate crime based on anti-LGBTQ prejudice. They ordered the Peruvian state to provide reparations and medical and psychological treatment for Rojas Marín, and to continue the corresponding investigations to identify and punish those responsible. They also ordered Peru to begin tracking violence against LGBTQ+ people, and to develop a campaign to train and raise awareness among Peruvians of the subject.

== Consequences ==
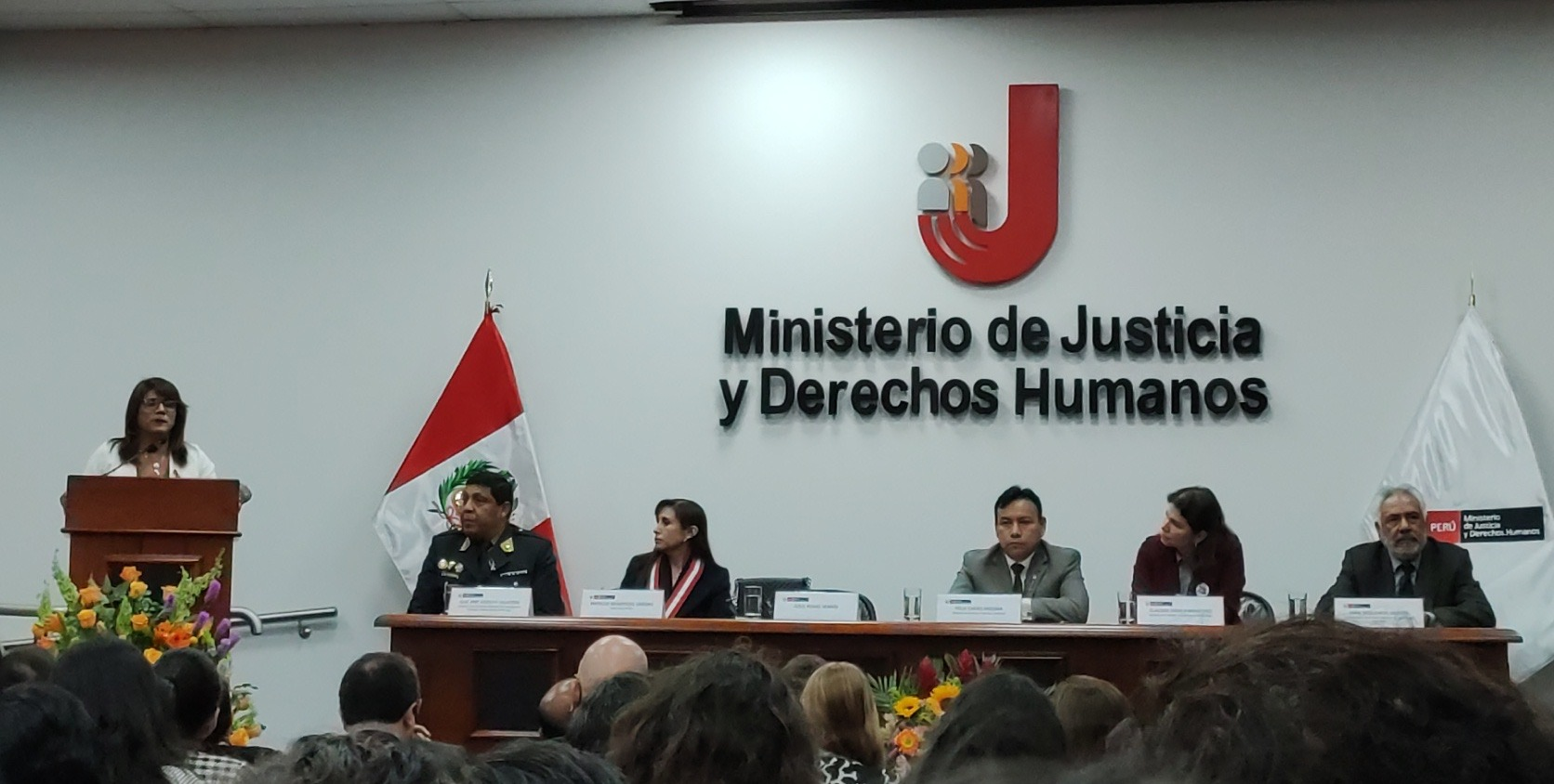
Azul Rojas Marín on stage to address the authorities at the event of the Peruvian State's public apology to her for violating her rights

Peru formally apologized to Rojas for the violation of her rights in a public ceremony on November 2022. According to political scientist José Alejandro Godoy, this was the first time the state of Peru had apologized for a homophobic or transphobic act. During the ceremony, Azul Rojas lit a candle at the portrait of her mother, Juana Rosa Tanta Marín, who was included in the ceremony but had died in 2017. At the ceremony, the head of the Ministry of Justice and Human Rights announced the formation of "a technical team to ... investigate and administer justice during criminal proceedings for cases of LGTBI+ people".

As of 2025, five years after the IACtHR's ruling, the Peruvian state had not yet complied with the Court's request for a specialized protocol for the investigation and punishment of violence against the LGBTQ+ community. Marín also says that only a small part of the economic reparations and none of the medical and psychological care have been provided.

=== Domestic case ===
In November 2018, following the recommendation of the Inter-American Commission on Human Rights, the Prosecutor's Office provided for the reopening of the investigation. In 2019 it requested the criminal court declare the proceedings against the police officers null and void. In August of that year, a judge declared the request for nullification inadmissible; the Prosecutor's Office appealed this decision, but the appeal was dismissed, thus exhausting all criminal remedies and causing the case to be closed.

In 2022 the criminal investigation was re-opened. The case was heard by the Supreme Court of Peru in 2025; in December of that year, the court sentenced three policemen to 17 years in prison for the torture and aggravated rape of Rojas Marín. This was the first time in Peru that state agents were convicted of torture due to anti-LGBTQ+ prejudice.
