= Paiján District =

Paiján
- District
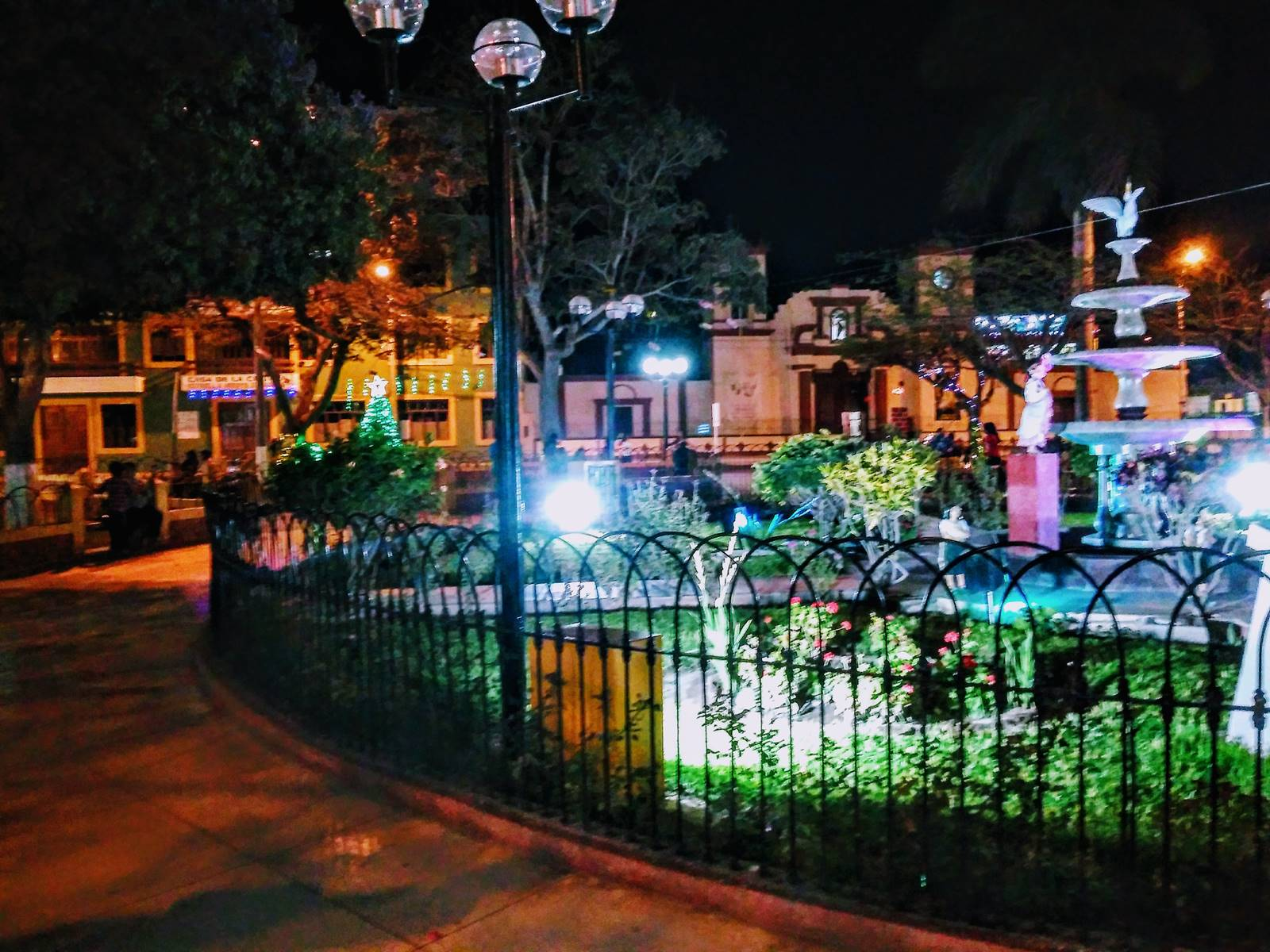
- Paiján District's Plaza de Armas. Located in northern Peru is one of the 7 districts of the province of Ascope.

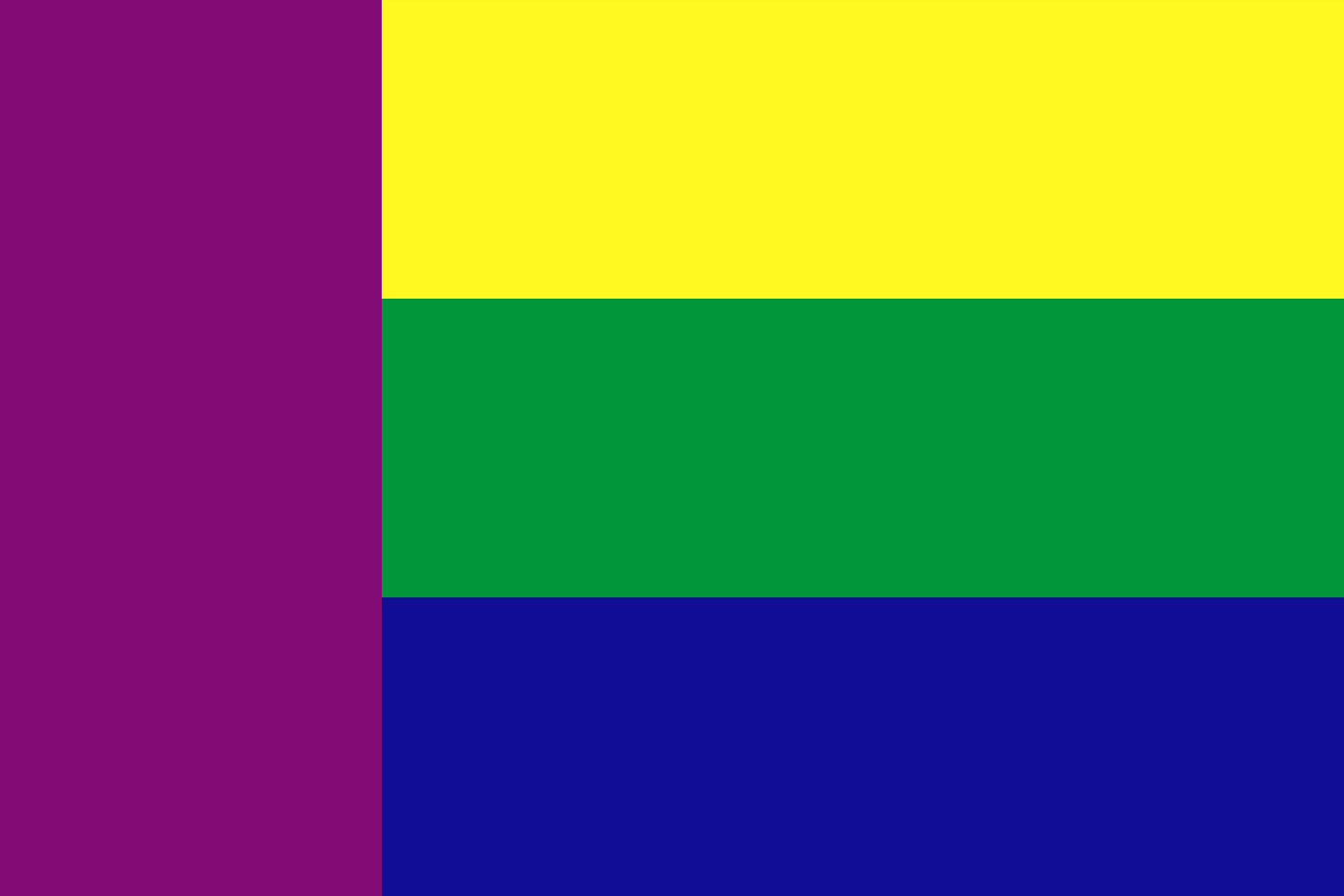
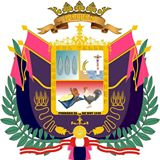
- Flag Coat of arms
- Interactive map of Paiján
- Country: Peru
- Region: La Libertad
- Province: Ascope
- Capital: Paiján

Government
  - Mayor: Daniel Alva Iglesias

Area
  - Total: 79.32 km^{2} (30.63 sq mi)
- Elevation: 80 m (260 ft)

Population (2017)
  - Total: 25,927
  - Density: 326.9/km^{2} (846.6/sq mi)
- Time zone: UTC-5 (PET)
- UBIGEO: 130205
- Website: Official Website

Paiján District is one of eight districts of the province Ascope in Peru. The district of Paiján is one of the eight districts of the province of Ascope, located in the Department of La Libertad, under the administration of the regional government of La Libertad, in the northern part of Peru. It borders on the north with the district of Rázuri; To the east with the district of Casa Grande; To the south with the district of Chocope; To the west with the district of Rázuri.

From the hierarchical point of view of the Catholic Church it is part of the Archdiocese of Trujillo. Paiján is one of the seven districts that make up the province of Ascope and one of the districts with the largest population after the district of Casa Grande. According to information from the INEI (National Institute of Statistics and Informatics) It has a population of 25, 584 inhabitants.

== History ==
Paiján, a town that was previously called "Paycaem" (according to the Yunga language: a place of water and trees) was founded by the Corregidor Don Diego de Mora and called it "Villa el Salvador de Paiján".

Although to date no one knows who founded it, there are some assumptions that affirm this.

The district was created during the government of President Eduardo Lopez of Romagna, by law of November 10, 1900, the same that gave to its capital the title of Villa and in the Law n º 9689 of December 12, 1942 it elevated it to category of city.
