= Chao, Virú =

Chao
- Town
- Location within Peru
- Coordinates: 8°32′25.07″S 78°40′38.96″W
- Country: Peru
- Region: La Libertad
- Province: Virú
- District: Chao

Government
  - Mayor: Ney Heli Gamez Espinoza
- Time zone: UTC-5 (PET)

Chao is a town in Northern Peru, capital of the district of Chao in the region La Libertad. This town is located about 65 km south of Trujillo. Chao is primarily an agricultural center in the Chao Valley.

== Climate ==
Climate data for Chao (San Carlos), elevation 141 m (463 ft), (1991–2009)
Month	Jan	Feb	Mar	Apr	May	Jun	Jul	Aug	Sep	Oct	Nov	Dec	Year
Mean daily maximum °C (°F)	28.2 (82.8)	29.1 (84.4)	29.2 (84.6)	27.7 (81.9)	25.0 (77.0)	23.5 (74.3)	22.2 (72.0)	21.8 (71.2)	22.5 (72.5)	23.4 (74.1)	24.0 (75.2)	25.4 (77.7)	25.2 (77.3)
Mean daily minimum °C (°F)	20.9 (69.6)	21.8 (71.2)	21.5 (70.7)	19.6 (67.3)	17.3 (63.1)	16.3 (61.3)	16.2 (61.2)	16.1 (61.0)	16.4 (61.5)	16.5 (61.7)	17.7 (63.9)	18.9 (66.0)	18.3 (64.9)
Average precipitation mm (inches)	0.6 (0.02)	1.6 (0.06)	1.2 (0.05)	0.7 (0.03)	0.4 (0.02)	0.3 (0.01)	0.1 (0.00)	0.0 (0.0)	0.1 (0.00)	1.6 (0.06)	0.9 (0.04)	1.3 (0.05)	8.8 (0.34)
Average relative humidity (%)	75.5	74.5	75.7	77.5	83.6	85.3	82.9	82.8	80.2	71.8	76.8	79.7	78.9
Source: Sistema Nacional de Información Ambiental (precipitation 2001–2009, humidity 2000–2009)

== See also ==
- Chavimochic
- Virú Valley
- Virú
- Moche valley
