= Julio César Morán =

Peruvian politician

Member of the Regional Assembly of the Víctor Raúl Haya de la Torre Region
- In office 26 July 1990 – 5 April 1992

Mayor of Rázuri
- In office January 1, 1987 – December 31, 1989
- Preceded by: Manuel Uriol Boy
- Succeeded by: Mario Chinchayán Atoche

Personal details
- Born: Julio César Morán Otiniano; 20 November 1961 (age 64) Trujillo, Peru
- Party: Peruvian Aprista Party
- Education: National University of Trujillo (LLB)

Julio César Morán Otiniano (born 20 November 1961) is a Peruvian politician. He has served as Mayor of the Rázuri District from 1987 to 1989. In 2018, he ran for Governor of La Libertad, placing second and losing to Manuel Llempén of Alliance for Progress in the first round.

Since 2021, Morán has served Regional General Secretary of the Peruvian Aprista Party in La Libertad, following former congressman Elías Rodríguez expelling for alleged treason from the party, as it was revealed Rodríguez had commenced the registration of his own regional movement while serving as national Institutional General Secretary.
