= Casa Grande, Peru =

Casa Grande
- Town
- Location within Peru
- Coordinates: 7°44′40.50″S 79°11′17.32″W
- Country: Peru
- Region: La Libertad
- Province: Ascope
- District: Casa Grande

Population
  - Estimate (2015): 32,018
- Time zone: UTC-5 (PET)

Casa Grande is a town in Northern Peru, capital of the district of Casa Grande of Ascope Province in the region La Libertad. This town is located beside the Pan-American Highway some 48 km north of Trujillo city in the agricultural Chicama Valley.

== Climate ==
Climate data for Casa Grande, elevation 158 m (518 ft)
Month	Jan	Feb	Mar	Apr	May	Jun	Jul	Aug	Sep	Oct	Nov	Dec	Year
Mean daily maximum °C (°F)	28.4 (83.1)	29.2 (84.6)	29.3 (84.7)	27.5 (81.5)	25.1 (77.2)	23.2 (73.8)	22.3 (72.1)	22.4 (72.3)	23.0 (73.4)	23.8 (74.8)	24.8 (76.6)	26.4 (79.5)	25.5 (77.8)
Mean daily minimum °C (°F)	19.3 (66.7)	20.2 (68.4)	20.2 (68.4)	18.5 (65.3)	16.6 (61.9)	15.4 (59.7)	14.6 (58.3)	14.6 (58.3)	14.7 (58.5)	15.1 (59.2)	15.6 (60.1)	17.4 (63.3)	16.8 (62.3)
Average precipitation mm (inches)	2.4 (0.09)	2.7 (0.11)	2.9 (0.11)	1.9 (0.07)	0.4 (0.02)	0.2 (0.01)	1.5 (0.06)	0.2 (0.01)	0.7 (0.03)	0.6 (0.02)	0.6 (0.02)	0.9 (0.04)	15 (0.59)
Average relative humidity (%)	74.9	75.2	77.3	77.3	80.9	81.7	81.5	81.0	80.7	79.3	78.4	76.9	78.8
Source: Sistema Nacional de Información Ambiental

== See also ==
- Paiján culture
- Ascope Province
- Chavimochic
- Virú Valley
- Virú
- Moche valley
