= Ascope province =

Province in Peru

Coordinates: 7°42′47″S 79°06′56″W

Ascope
- Province
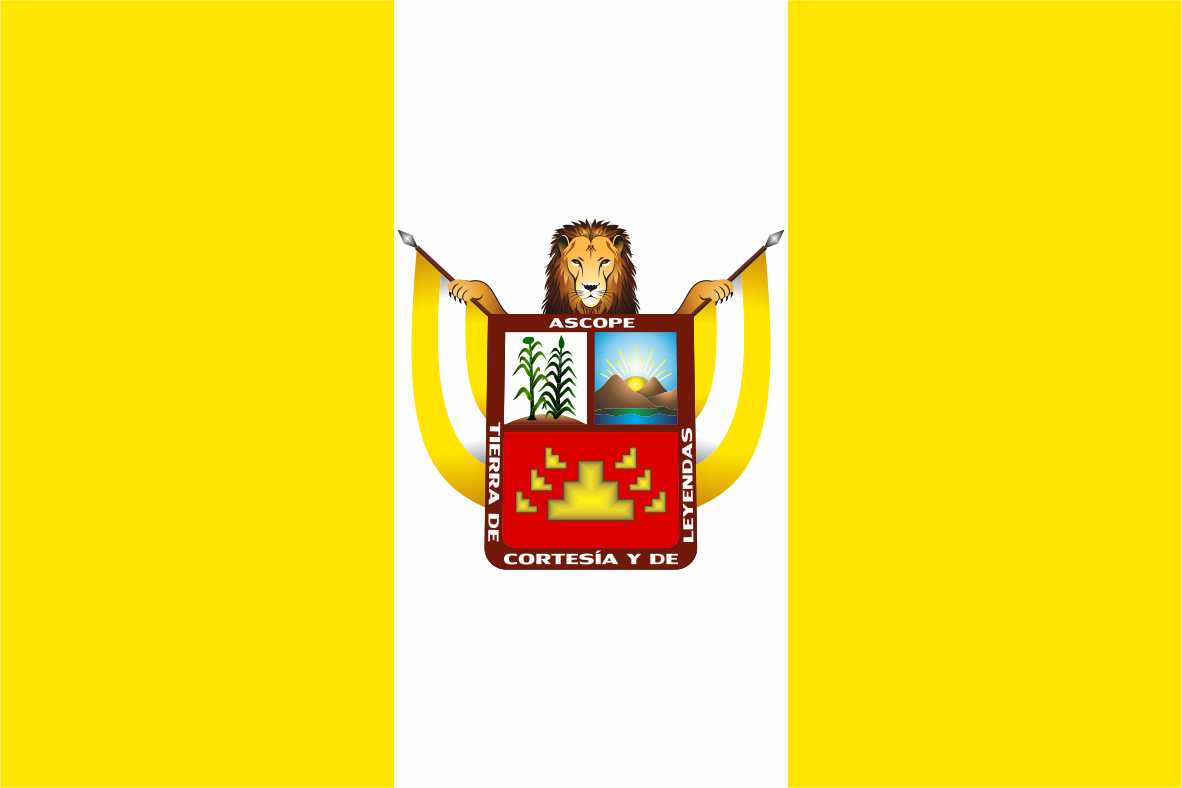
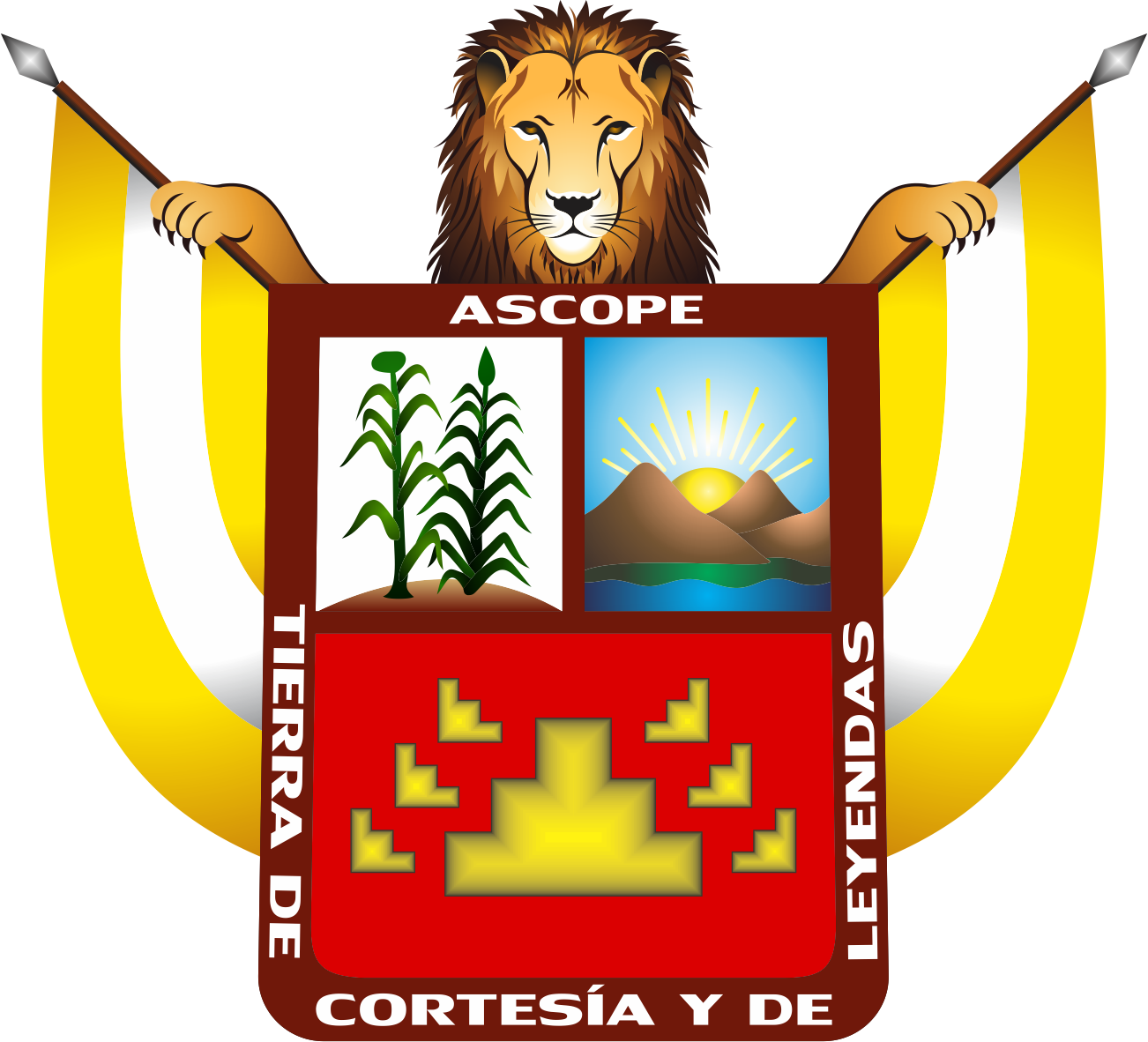
- Flag Coat of arms

- Location of Ascope in La Libertad Region
- Country: Peru
- Region: La Libertad
- Founded: 1 June 1984
- Capital: Ascope

Government
  - Mayor: Mario Salomon Velarde Carrion

Area
  - Total: 2,655.75 km^{2} (1,025.39 sq mi)

Population
  - Total: 123,480
  - Density: 46.495/km^{2} (120.42/sq mi)
- UBIGEO: 1302

Ascope is a province in the La Libertad Region, Peru. It is bordered by the province of Trujillo on the south; the province of Pacasmayo on the north; the provinces of Contumazá, Otuzco, and Gran Chimú on the east; and the Pacific Ocean on the west. Its capital is Ascope.

From the hierarchical point of view of the Catholic Church, it is part of the Archdiocese of Trujillo.

== Political division ==
The province is divided into eight districts (Spanish: distritos, singular: distrito), each of which is headed by a mayor (alcalde):

Nº.	District	Population Cens. 2007	Capital	Mayor
1°	Ascope	---	Ascope	---
2°	Casa Grande	---	Casa Grande	---
3°	Chicama	---	Chicama	
4°	Chocope	---	Chocope	---
5°	Magdalena de Cao	---	Magdalena de Cao	---
6°	Santiago de Cao	---	Santiago de Cao	---
7°	Paiján	---	Paiján	---
8°	Rázuri	---	Puerto Chicama	---

== Some localities ==
- Santiago de Cao
- Sausal
- Roma
- Chiclín
- Chiquitoy
- Santa Clara
- San José

== See also ==
- Paiján culture
- Trujillo province
- Chicama Valley
- Moche Valley
