= Víctor Larco Herrera =

Peruvian politician (1870–1939)

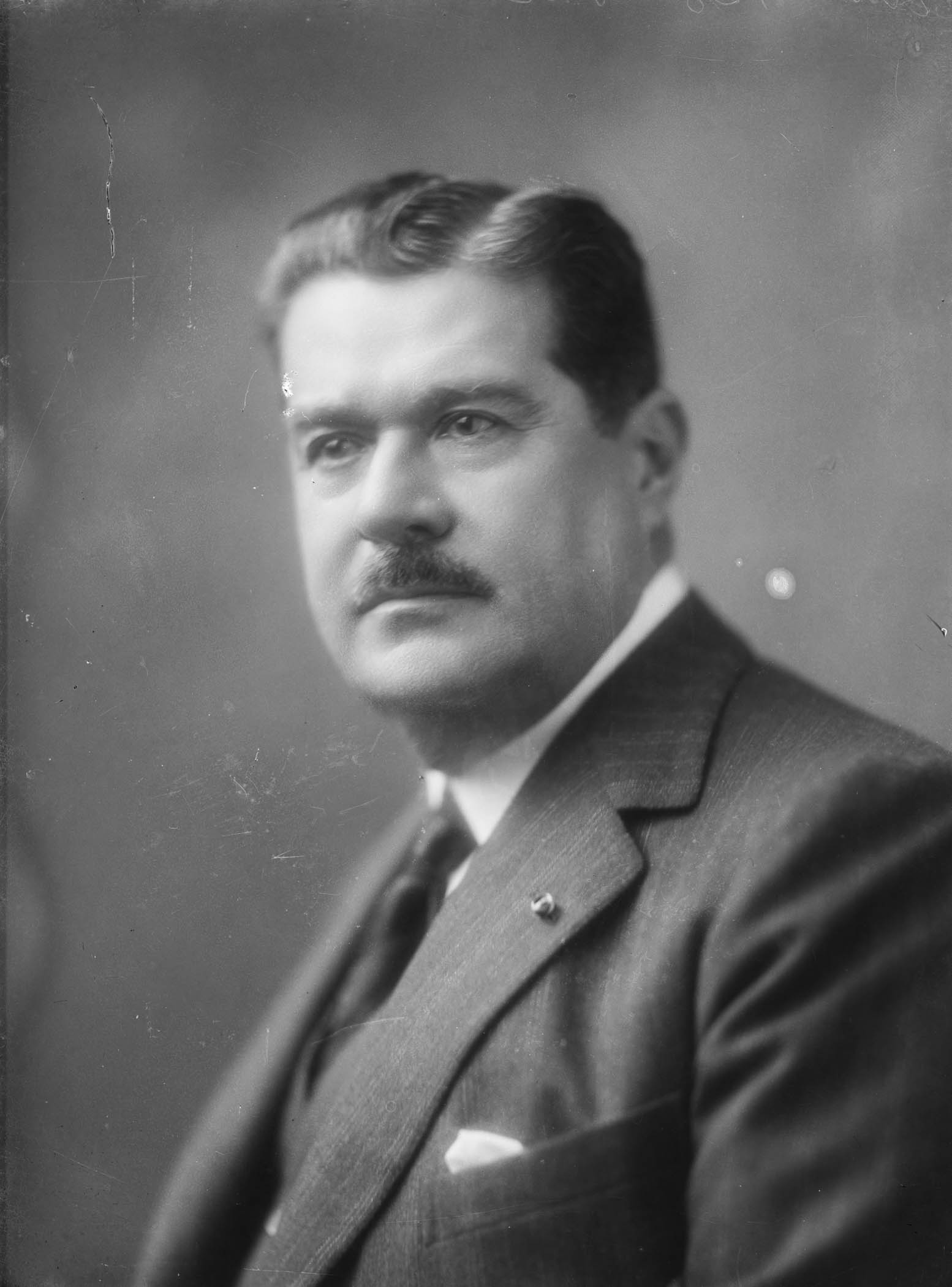
- Larco in 1928

Mayor of Trujillo
- In office 1913–1917

Personal details
- Born: 1870 Trujillo, Peru
- Died: May 10, 1939 (aged 68–69) Santiago, Chile
- Resting place: Presbítero Maestro
- Education: Colegio de la Inmaculada; Instituto de Lima; Peruvian Naval School
- Occupation: Politician, farmer, philanthropist
- Affiliations: Club Nacional; Club de la Unión

Victor Larco Herrera (Trujillo; 1870 – Santiago; May 10, 1939) was a Peruvian politician, farmer and philanthropist. A member of the prominent Larco family, he served as Mayor of Trujillo (1913–1917) and as a Senator for La Libertad (1905–1918; 1919).

He devoted much of his life to social and cultural affairs. In 1921, the city of Lima's psychiatric hospital was renamed to Víctor Larco Herrera Hospital. Similarly, Trujillo's Buenos Aires District was renamed after him in 1955, as he had served as a benefactor of the first residents of the district. One of his birthplace's main avenues is also named after him.

== Biography ==
He was elected senator for the La Libertad Region in 1904, and then successively re-elected until 1919. In 1913, he was elected mayor of Trujillo, to the city gave the building now occupied the Municipality of Trujillo.

At the time of the coup that ousted then-President Guillermo Billinghurst on February 4, 1914, joined representatives who advocated for the right of succession that constitution recognizes as first vice president, and for this he had to suffer a brief incarceration. Then Larco Herrera had agricultural operations to Argentina between 1916 and 1917, encouraged by the favorable situation created by the First World War.

== See also ==
- Rafael Larco Herrera
- Rafael Larco Hoyle
