= Chao District =

Chao
- District
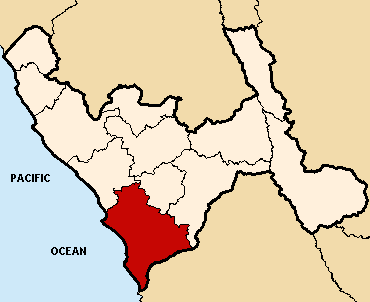
- Map of the province Virú's location
- Interactive map of Chao
- Coordinates: 8°32′25.8″S 78°40′41.7″W
- Country: Peru
- Region: La Libertad
- Province: Virú
- Founded: January 4, 1995
- Capital: Chao

Government
  - Mayor: Ney Heli Gamez Espinoza

Area
  - Total: 1,736.87 km^{2} (670.61 sq mi)
- Elevation: 130 m (430 ft)

Population (2005 census)
  - Total: 19,220
  - Density: 11.07/km^{2} (28.66/sq mi)
- Time zone: UTC-5 (PET)
- UBIGEO: 131202

Chao District is one of three districts of the province Virú in Peru.

== Climate ==
Climate data for Chao (San Carlos), elevation 141 m (463 ft), (1991–2009)
Month	Jan	Feb	Mar	Apr	May	Jun	Jul	Aug	Sep	Oct	Nov	Dec	Year
Mean daily maximum °C (°F)	28.2 (82.8)	29.1 (84.4)	29.2 (84.6)	27.7 (81.9)	25.0 (77.0)	23.5 (74.3)	22.2 (72.0)	21.8 (71.2)	22.5 (72.5)	23.4 (74.1)	24.0 (75.2)	25.4 (77.7)	25.2 (77.3)
Mean daily minimum °C (°F)	20.9 (69.6)	21.8 (71.2)	21.5 (70.7)	19.6 (67.3)	17.3 (63.1)	16.3 (61.3)	16.2 (61.2)	16.1 (61.0)	16.4 (61.5)	16.5 (61.7)	17.7 (63.9)	18.9 (66.0)	18.3 (64.9)
Average precipitation mm (inches)	0.6 (0.02)	1.6 (0.06)	1.2 (0.05)	0.7 (0.03)	0.4 (0.02)	0.3 (0.01)	0.1 (0.00)	0.0 (0.0)	0.1 (0.00)	1.6 (0.06)	0.9 (0.04)	1.3 (0.05)	8.8 (0.34)
Average relative humidity (%)	75.5	74.5	75.7	77.5	83.6	85.3	82.9	82.8	80.2	71.8	76.8	79.7	78.9
Source: Sistema Nacional de Información Ambiental (precipitation 2001–2009, humidity 2000–2009)
