= Casa Grande Hotel =

Casa Grande Hotel may refer to:

- Casa Grande Hotel (Casa Grande, Arizona), listed on the National Register of Historic Places in Pinal County, Arizona
- Casa Grande Hotel (Elk City, Oklahoma), listed on the National Register of Historic Places in Beckham County, Oklahoma

== See also ==
- Casa Grande (disambiguation)
