= Guadalupito District =

Guadalupito
- District
- Location within Peru
- Coordinates: 8.95°S 78.62°W
- Country: Peru
- Region: La Libertad
- Province: Virú
- Founded: January 4, 1995
- Capital: Guadalupito

Government
  - Mayor: Juan Miguel Joaquin Aranda

Area
  - Total: 404.72 km^{2} (156.26 sq mi)
- Elevation: 40 m (130 ft)

Population (2005 census)
  - Total: 5,917
  - Density: 14.62/km^{2} (37.87/sq mi)
- Time zone: UTC-5 (PET)
- UBIGEO: 131203

Guadalupito District is one of three districts of the province Virú in Peru.
