= Magdalena de Cao District =

Magdalena de Cao
- District
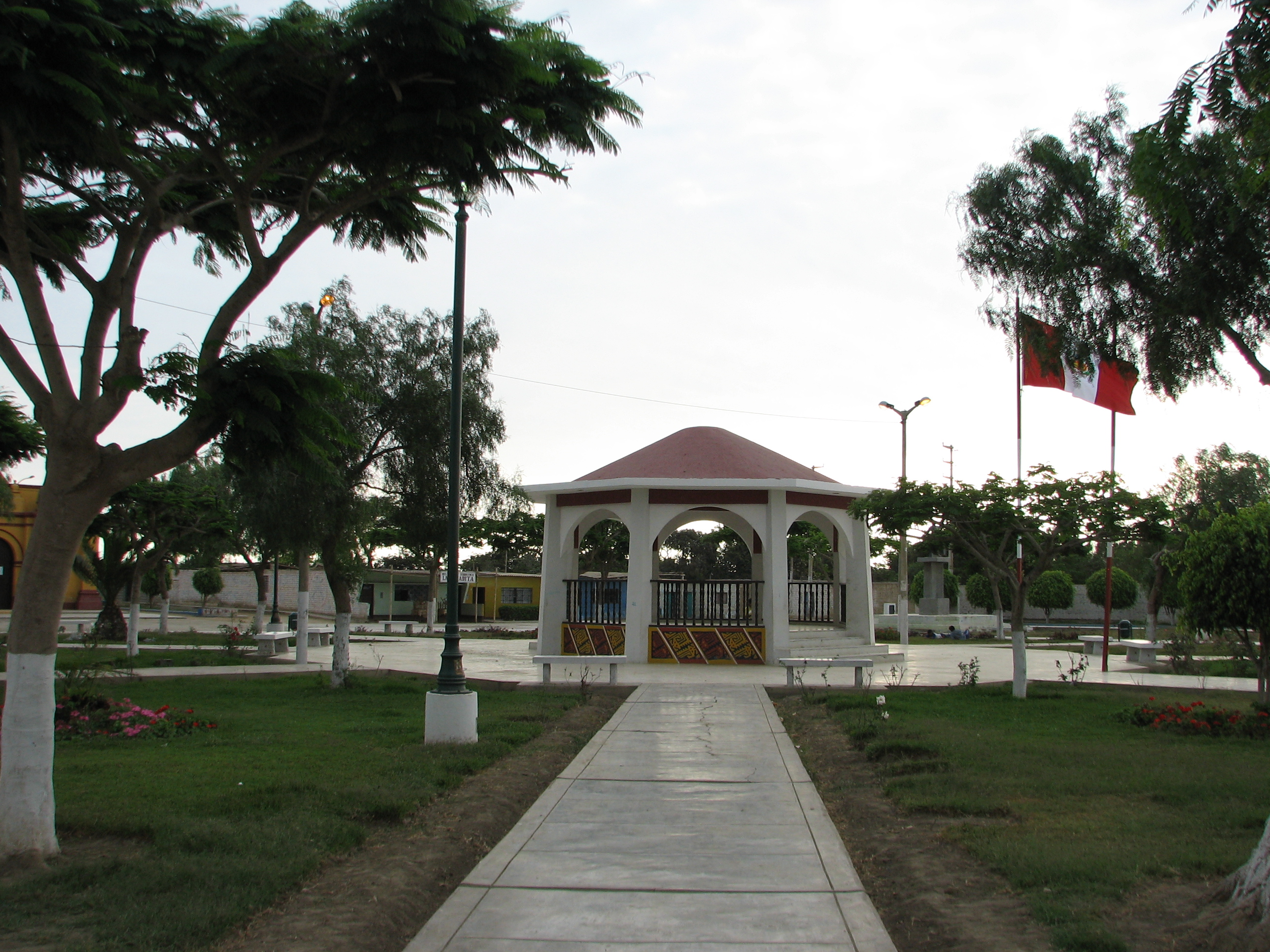
- Interactive map of Magdalena de Cao
- Country: Peru
- Region: La Libertad
- Province: Ascope
- Capital: Magdalena de Cao

Government
  - Mayor: Wilfredo Clemente Vargas De La Cruz

Area
  - Total: 158.96 km^{2} (61.37 sq mi)
- Elevation: 28 m (92 ft)

Population (2005 census)
  - Total: 3,090
  - Density: 19.4/km^{2} (50.3/sq mi)
- Time zone: UTC-5 (PET)
- UBIGEO: 130204

Magdalena de Cao District is one of eight districts of the province Ascope in Peru.
