= Ascope District =

Coordinates: 7.7138°S 79.1074°W

Ascope
- District
- Interactive map of Ascope
- Country: Peru
- Region: La Libertad
- Province: Ascope
- Capital: Ascope

Government
  - Mayor: Mario Salomon Velarde Carrion

Area
  - Total: 298.8 km^{2} (115.4 sq mi)
- Elevation: 230 m (750 ft)

Population (2005 census)
  - Total: 7,333
  - Density: 24.54/km^{2} (63.56/sq mi)
- Time zone: UTC-5 (PET)
- UBIGEO: 130201

Ascope District is one of eight districts of the province Ascope in Peru. According to 2020 census, the population of the district is 6855.

== See also ==
- Ascope city
