= Ascope =

- Town
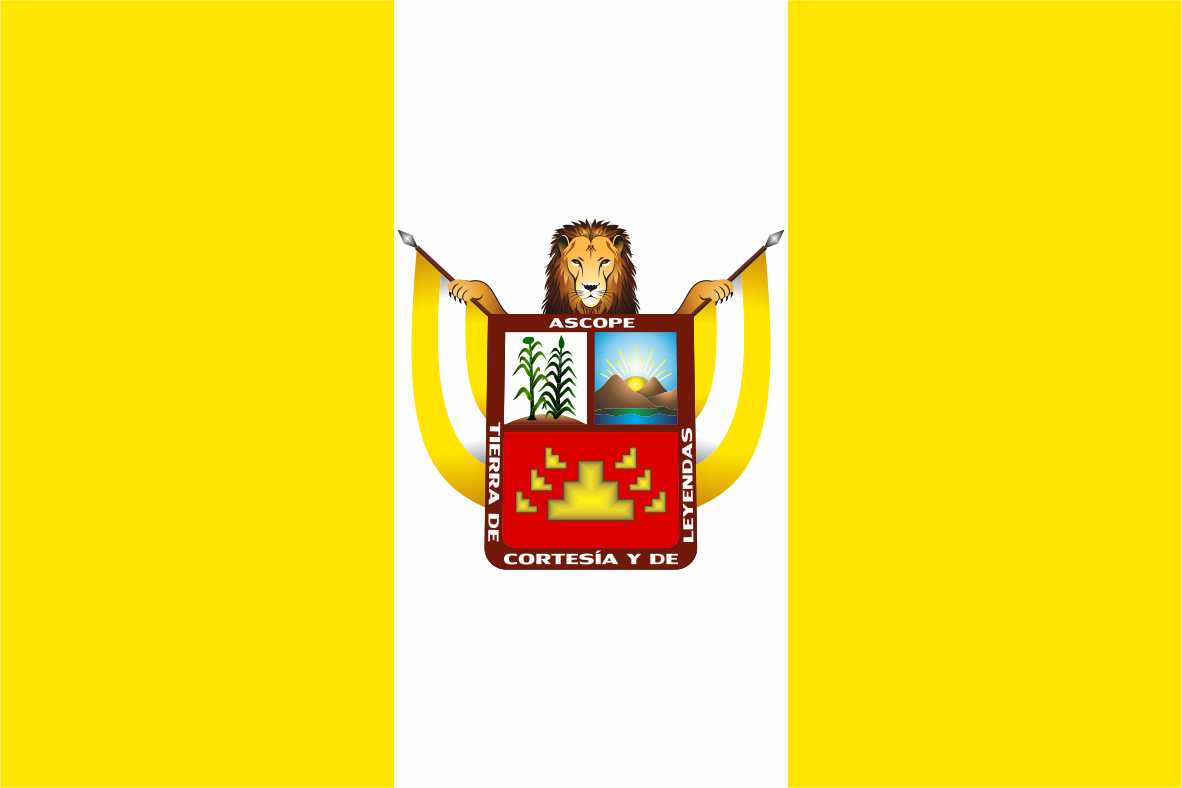
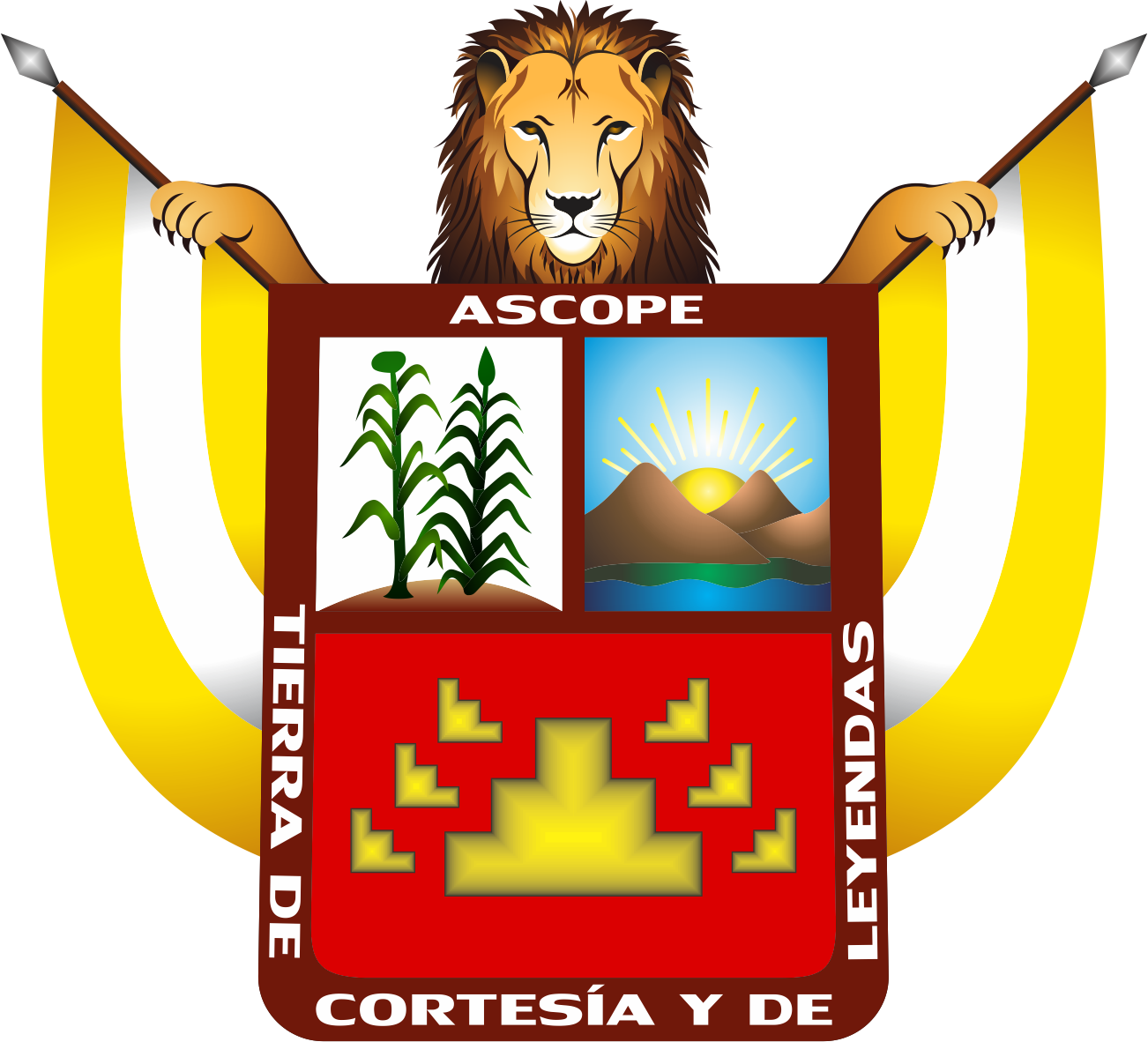
- Flag Seal

- Location within Peru
- Coordinates: 07°42′49.78″S 79°06′27.60″W
- Country: Peru
- Region: La Libertad
- Province: Ascope
- District: Ascope

Government
  - Mayor: Mario Salomon Velarde Carrion
- Elevation: 230 m (750 ft)

Population (2013)
  - Total: 10,560
- Time zone: UTC-5 (PET)

Ascope is a town in Northern Peru, capital of the province Ascope in the region La Libertad.

== See also ==
- Puerto Chicama
- Chicama
- El Brujo
