= Chocope District =

Chocope
- District
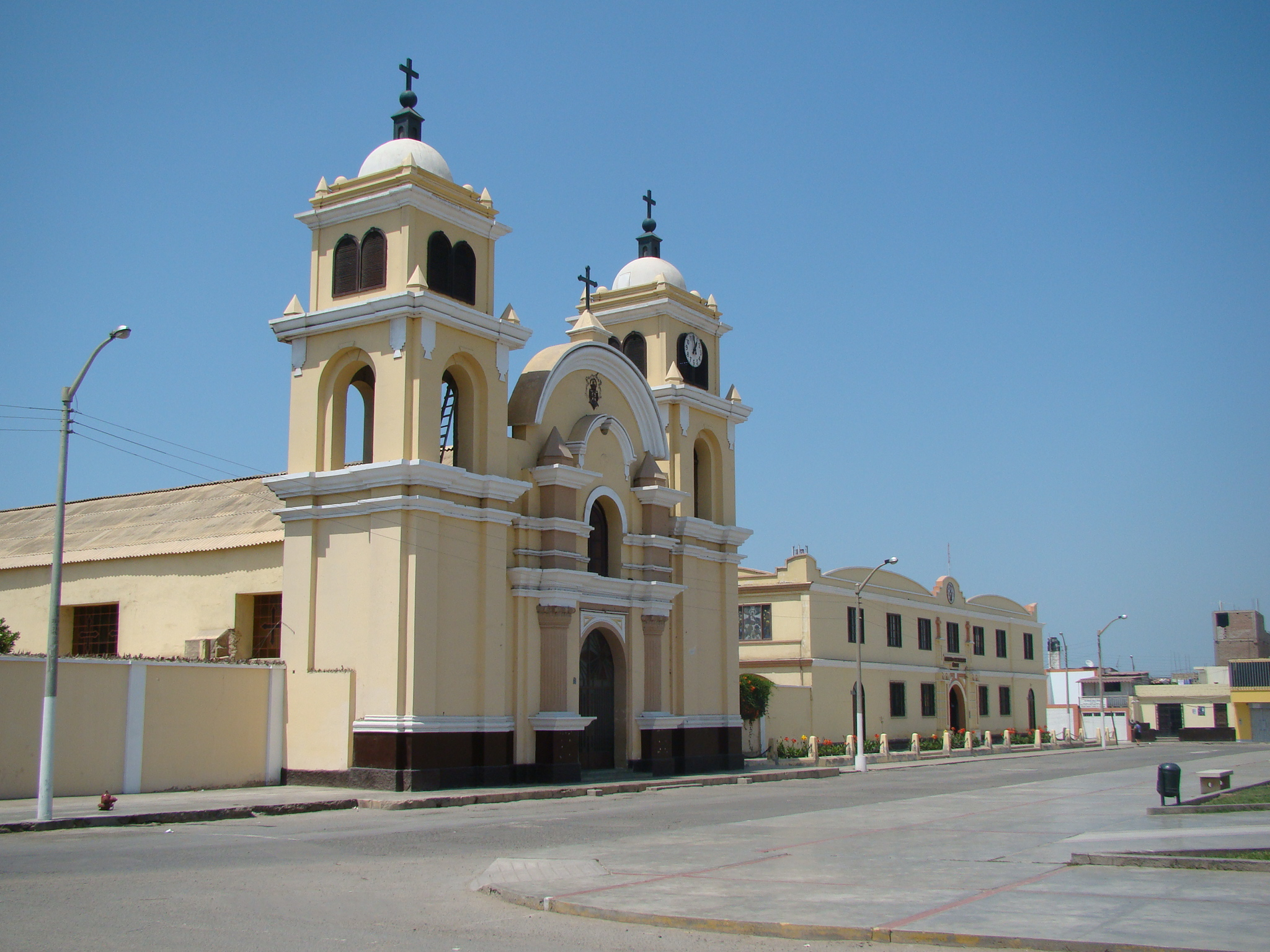
- Church and Carmelite convent in Chocope
- Interactive map of Chocope
- Country: Peru
- Region: La Libertad
- Province: Ascope
- Capital: Chocope

Population (1940)
  - Total: 1,302
- Time zone: UTC-5 (PET)

Chocope is a district of the Ascope Province, in the La Libertad Region of Peru.

In 1940 there were 1,302 people in Chocope.
