= Rafael Larco Herrera =

Peruvian politician (1872–1956)

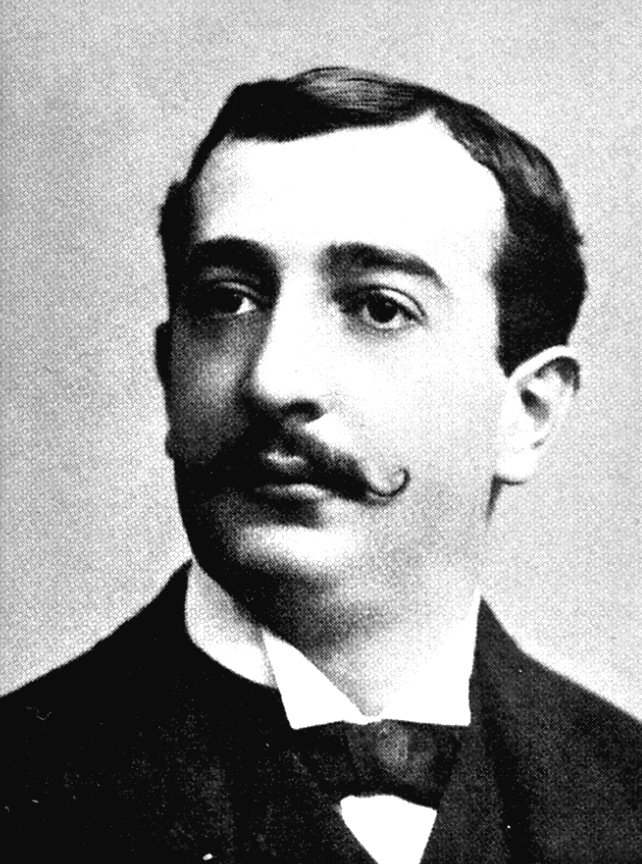
- Rafael Larco Herrera

First Vice President of Peru
- In office 1939–1945
- President: Manuel Prado
- Vice President: Carlos D. Gibson (Second Vice President)
- Preceded by: Ernesto Montagne Markholz
- Succeeded by: José Gálvez Barrenechea

Personal details
- Born: Teófilo Rafael Andrés Wenceslao Larco Herrera; July 22, 1872 Lima, Peru
- Died: March 14, 1956 (aged 83)
- Spouse: Esther Hoyle Castro (m. 1900–)
- Relations: Víctor Larco Herrera (brother)
- Children: 3, including Rafael Larco Hoyle
- Education: Colegio San Juan Trujillo, Colegio Internacional de Lima
- Occupation: Politician, businessman, landowner, philanthropist

Teófilo Rafael Andrés Wenceslao Larco Herrera (July 22, 1872 – March 14, 1956), known simply as Rafael Larco Herrera, was a Peruvian politician, businessman, landowner, and philanthropist. He was first vice-president of Peru during the first Government of Manuel Prado (1939–1945), as well as minister of Foreign Relations and interim minister of Finance and Commerce, on the cabinet led by David Samanez Ocampo (1931).

== Biography ==
Teófilo Rafael Andrés Wenceslao Larco Herrera was born on July 22, 1872, in Lima, Peru, to parents Don Rafael Larco Bruno and Doña Josefina Herrera Medina. One of his older brothers was Víctor Larco Herrera (1870–1939), who was a politician. He was educated at the Colegio San Juan Trujillo in Trujillo and at the Colegio Internacional de Lima.

In 1890 and 1895, He served as the administrator of Chiquitoy and Chiclín estates, which belonged to his family.

In 1896, he was a member and president of the Radical Party. In 1897, he presided over the Chicama Valley Patriotic Assembly.

In 1900, he married Esther Hoyle Castro, with whom he had three children: Rafael Larco Hoyle, Constante Larco Hoyle, and Javier Larco Hoyle. His son Rafael Larco Hoyle gained prominence as an archaeologist and a scholar.

Between 1901 and 1922, he oversaw the management of the Chiclin agricultural negotiation, in which he developed a new social program (school for the children of the operators, as well as houses and sanitation for them).

From the end of the 1910s and throughout the 1920s, he made several trips to the United States and Europe, to study the improvements in the agricultural industry.

In 1931, he was appointed Minister of Foreign Relations and Acting Minister of Finance, during the National Government Junta chaired by David Samanez Ocampo. Larco Herrera succeeded Colonel Ernesto Montagne Markholz as foreign minister. In the same year, he acquired the publishing company of the newspaper La Crónica and the magazine Variedades. He was president of the board of directors of La Crónica for about 30 years.

Between 1939 and 1945, he was First Vice President of the Republic, in the first government of Manuel Prado Ugarteche . And although he later retired from public life, he continued to travel abroad to promote international solidarity and peace in the post-war world.

He was president of the Patriotic Union and the National Collection in Trujillo. He was a member of the Geographical Society of Peru, the Society of History and Geography in Mexico City, the Society of History and Archeology in Lima, the American Historical Institution of Cultural Relations in Madrid and the National Geographic Society in Washington DC.

From the private collection that he owned at the Hacienda de Chiclín, his son, Rafael Larco Hoyle, founded the Rafael Larco Herrera Archaeological Museum (now the Larco Museum) in Lima, in honor of his father.

He died at the age of 83.

== Bibliography ==
- Basadre, Jorge: Historia de la República del Perú. 1822 – 1933, Eighth Edition, amended and expanded. Volume 12. Edited for the newspaper "La República" of Lima and the University "Ricardo Palma". Published in Santiago, Chile, 1998.
- Guerra, Margarita: Historia General del Perú. Volume XII. La República Contemporánea (1919–1950). First Edition. Editorial Milla Batres. Lima, Perú, 1984.
- Tauro del Pino, Alberto: Enciclopedia Ilustrada del Perú. Third Edition. Volume 9, JAB/LLO. Lima, PEISA, 2001. ISBN 9972-40-158-8
