= Rázuri District =

Rázuri
- District
- Interactive map of Rázuri
- Country: Peru
- Region: La Libertad
- Province: Ascope
- Founded: May 9, 1925
- Capital: Puerto Malabrigo

Government
  - Mayor: José Luis Cumplido Arriaga

Area
  - Total: 317.09 km^{2} (122.43 sq mi)
- Elevation: 8 m (26 ft)

Population (2005 census)
  - Total: 7,611
  - Density: 24.00/km^{2} (62.17/sq mi)
- Time zone: UTC-5 (PET)
- UBIGEO: 130206

Rázuri District is one of eight districts of the province Ascope in Peru.

== See also ==
- Chicama Valley
- Puerto Chicama
