= Julio Castillo Narváez =

Peruvian journalist

Julio Castillo Narváez (died May 3, 2011) was a Peruvian producer and host of a radio news program on the Radio Ollantay station. He was known as a stern critic of the local government. Narváez was murdered in Viru, Peru, on World Press Freedom Day in 2011. According to the Committee to Protect Journalists, Narváez was one of three broadcast journalists killed in Peru that year.

== Career ==
Julio Castillo Narváez worked in journalism for more than 20 years. He was the host of the radio program Noticiero Ollantay. He had worked for Radio Ollantay as a Radio Programme producer.

== Death ==
Shortly before his murder, Narváez and another journalist had received threatening messages, and the show had been vandalized after Narváez accused regional council member Herbert Jimenez Urquiaga of a suspected real estate business deal. Following the acts of vandalism, local police were contacted in a plea for protection of the premises and hosts, however, the request was declined. Having regularly received death threats, he continued to criticize the local government.

On May 3, 2011, Castillo was shot six times by four men during lunch at a restaurant. Despite the public nature of his murder, his assailants escaped immediate capture.

Irina Bokova, the director-general of UNESCO, condemned Castillo's slaying: "This crime is an attack on the basic human right of journalists and citizens to speak their mind and hold free debates about issues that concern them. The tragedy of this killing is made all the more poignant for occurring on a day dedicated to the celebration of press freedom. I urge the authorities to investigate this killing and bring its culprits to justice.”

Despite the pressure applied by UNESCO and NGOs, no progress has been made in the case. Assassination of two other Peruvian journalists, one of them with a similar motive to Castillo's murder, followed some four months later. Journalist Pedro Alfonso Flores Silva, who worked for Channel 6 in Chimbote, was shot and killed on 8 September.

The third broadcast host José Oquendo Reyes, of both Radio Alas Peruanas and BTV Canal 45, was killed on 14 September in Pueblo Nuevo.

=== Reaction ===
Many journalism groups have spoken out and condemned Castillo's murder, and have called for authorities to tighten and continue the investigation. Reporters Without Borders said, “The political aspects of the case will almost certainly result in attempts to pressure the investigation." International Federation of Journalists Jim Boumelha said, "This is a shocking cold blooded murder and we urge the authorities to leave no stone unturned in the hunt for our colleague's killers who must face justice, it appears that the victim received threats prior to his murder, suggesting he was targeted for his journalistic work. The fact that he was killed on World Press Freedom Day adds to the hurt and the suffering from this tragedy but should also strengthen our resolve to stop violence against journalists".
