= Carlos D. Gibson =

Peruvian lawyer, professor and politician

Carlos Diego Gibson
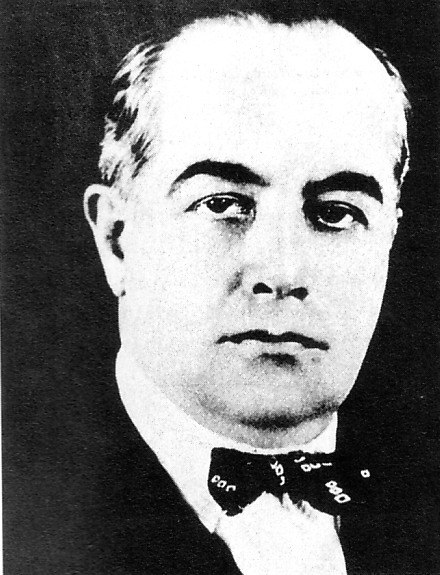
- Carlos Diego Gibson Möller

Second Vice President of Peru
- In office 1939–1945
- President: Manuel Prado
- Vice President: Rafael Larco Herrera (First Vice President)
- Preceded by: Antonio Rodríguez Ramírez
- Succeeded by: Eduardo Ganoza y Ganoza

Personal details
- Born: Carlos Guillermo Diego Gibson Möller; 10 February 1889 Arequipa, Peru
- Died: 25 September 1954 (aged 65)
- Spouse: María Mercedes Lira de Romaña
- Relations: Doris Gibson (niece)
- Children: 7
- Education: Victor Bailey College, National University of San Agustín (JD), University of Oxford, University of Cambridge (MA), Sorbonne University
- Occupation: Lawyer, professor, politician, educator

Carlos Diego Gibson (10 February 1889 – 25 September 1954) was a Peruvian lawyer, professor and politician. He was Second Vice President of Peru (1939–1945) and Rector of the National University of San Agustín (1939–1944).

== Biography ==
Carlos Diego Gibson Möller was born on 10 February 1889, in Arequipa, Peru. His father was Enrique W. Gibson Bernaldo de Estremadoyro, son of James Thomas Gibson and María Pía Bernaldo de Estremadoyro y Vásquez. His mother was Dorotea Möller Sojo-Vallejo, daughter of Guillermo Möller Keetz and María Sojo-Vallejo. He was the brother of the poet Percy Gibson (poet), and uncle of the journalist Doris Gibson.

He studied at the Colegio Victor Bailly and, later, he entered the National University of San Agustín in Arequipa, from where he obtained a law degree in 1908. He obtained a doctorate in 1910, and a Ph.D. in 1936.

He taught at his alma mater, as an interim professor of ancient literature, art history, and critical history of Peru (1907). He later became professor of statistics, finance, and financial legislation of Peru at the National University of San Marcos in Lima.

In 1913, he travelled to Europe. In England, he took courses at the University of Oxford and the University of Cambridge, from where he earned a degree of Masters in Arts. Then he went to France, where he studied at the Sorbonne University.

In 1916, he returned to Peru. He married in Arequipa with María Mercedes Lira de Romaña, with whom he had seven children.

In 1919, he was appointed first secretary, then an adviser, and finally a charge d'affaires at the embassy in the United States. He was appointed honorary attaché in Buenos Aires. Later, he was appointed as an honorary secretary in London. He was appointed as a minister plenipotentiary to Scandinavian countries and, later, to Bolivia.

In 1939, along with Manuel Prado and Ugarteche as President and Rafael Larco Herrera as First Vice President, he was elected Second Vice President of the Republic, a nominal position that he held until the end of that government, in 1945.

Likewise, he was the rector of the National University of San Agustín in Arequipa (1939-1944). He gained prominence as a lecturer at the university. In 1940, he was elected Dean of the Arequipa Bar Association.

He was also a member of the British Institute of Philosophy, and represented Peru in different organizations, among them the International Conference on Labor and Social Security, in Geneva; at the Philosophical Congress, in Prague, and at the Congress of International Documentation, Paris are notable ones.

In 1949, he put an end to his prolonged university career.

== Bibliography ==
- Pardo Gámez de Belaunde, Adela (1967). Arequipa: su pasado, presente y futuro. Impr. Litográfica del Perú.
- Tauro del Pino, Alberto: Enciclopedia Ilustrada del Perú. Third Edition. Volume 7, FER/GUZ. Lima, PEISA, 2001. ISBN 9972-40-156-1
