= Virú District =

Virú
- District
- Interactive map of Virú
- Country: Peru
- Region: La Libertad
- Province: Virú
- Founded: December 28, 1961
- Capital: Virú

Government
  - Mayor: Roger Cruz Alarcon

Area
  - Total: 1,077.15 km^{2} (415.89 sq mi)
- Elevation: 68 m (223 ft)

Population (2005 census)
  - Total: 42,638
  - Density: 39.584/km^{2} (102.52/sq mi)
- Time zone: UTC-5 (PET)
- UBIGEO: 131201

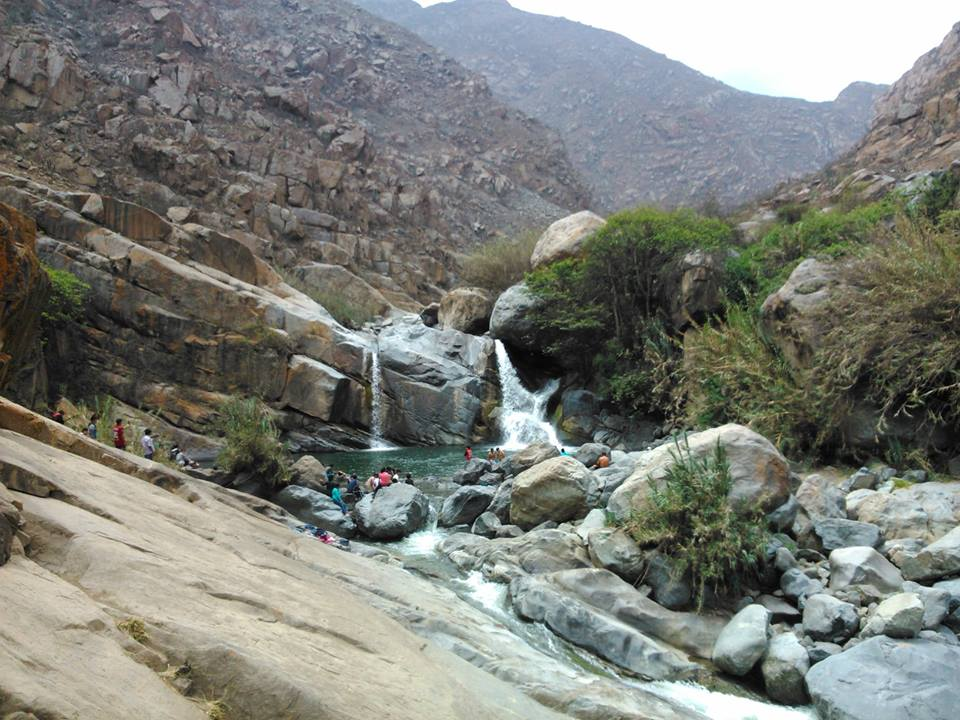
The Condornada waterfalls, located in the highlands of the Caray hamlet in Virú Province, Peru

Virú District is one of three districts of the province Virú in Peru.

== Localities ==
- Puerto Morín
- Santa Elena
- San José
