= Casa Grande District =

Casa Grande
- District
- Interactive map of Casa Grande
- Country: Peru
- Region: La Libertad
- Province: Ascope
- Founded: January 21, 1998
- Capital: Casa Grande

Government
  - Mayor: Alejandro Navarro Fernandez (2011-2014)

Area
  - Total: 677.17 km^{2} (261.46 sq mi)
- Elevation: 240 m (790 ft)

Population (2005 census)
  - Total: 30,795
  - Density: 45.476/km^{2} (117.78/sq mi)
- Time zone: UTC-5 (PET)
- UBIGEO: 130208

Casa Grande District is one of eight districts of the province of Ascope in Peru.

== Localities ==
- Roma

== Climate ==
Climate data for Casa Grande, elevation 158 m (518 ft)
Month	Jan	Feb	Mar	Apr	May	Jun	Jul	Aug	Sep	Oct	Nov	Dec	Year
Mean daily maximum °C (°F)	28.4 (83.1)	29.2 (84.6)	29.3 (84.7)	27.5 (81.5)	25.1 (77.2)	23.2 (73.8)	22.3 (72.1)	22.4 (72.3)	23.0 (73.4)	23.8 (74.8)	24.8 (76.6)	26.4 (79.5)	25.5 (77.8)
Mean daily minimum °C (°F)	19.3 (66.7)	20.2 (68.4)	20.2 (68.4)	18.5 (65.3)	16.6 (61.9)	15.4 (59.7)	14.6 (58.3)	14.6 (58.3)	14.7 (58.5)	15.1 (59.2)	15.6 (60.1)	17.4 (63.3)	16.8 (62.3)
Average precipitation mm (inches)	2.4 (0.09)	2.7 (0.11)	2.9 (0.11)	1.9 (0.07)	0.4 (0.02)	0.2 (0.01)	1.5 (0.06)	0.2 (0.01)	0.7 (0.03)	0.6 (0.02)	0.6 (0.02)	0.9 (0.04)	15 (0.59)
Average relative humidity (%)	74.9	75.2	77.3	77.3	80.9	81.7	81.5	81.0	80.7	79.3	78.4	76.9	78.8
Source: Sistema Nacional de Información Ambiental
