= Santiago de Cao District =

Santiago de Cao
- District
- Coat of arms
- Interactive map of Santiago de Cao
- Country: Peru
- Region: La Libertad
- Province: Ascope
- Capital: Santiago de Cao

Government
  - Mayor: Felipe Santiago Cerna Garcia

Area
  - Total: 128.72 km^{2} (49.70 sq mi)
- Elevation: 8 m (26 ft)

Population (2005 census)
  - Total: 20,059
  - Density: 155.83/km^{2} (403.61/sq mi)
- Time zone: UTC-5 (PET)
- UBIGEO: 130207

Santiago de Cao District is one of eight districts of the province Ascope in Peru.
