= Chao Valley =

Valley in La Libertad, Peru

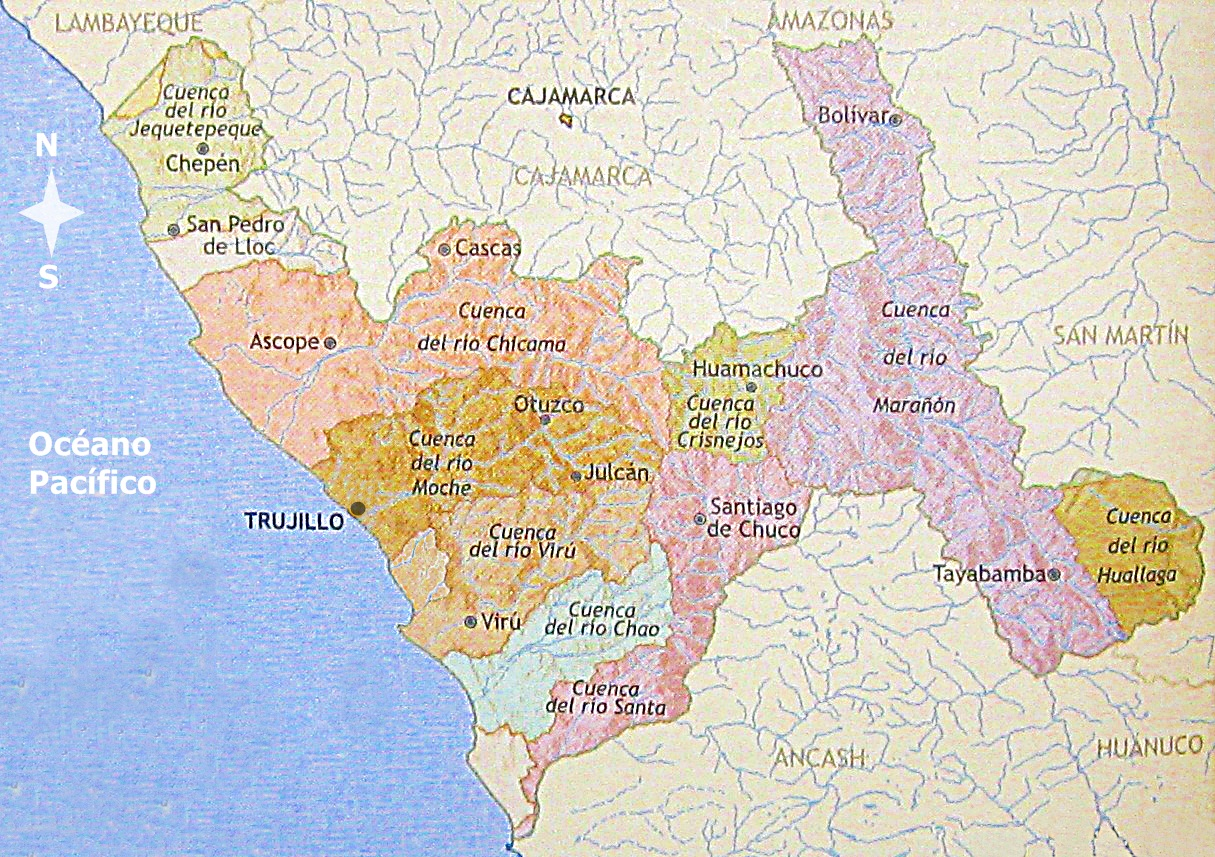
The Chao valley is located at south of Virú Valley in La Libertad Region

Chao Valley is an area located at south of Virú Valley in La Libertad Region, northern Peru. It has significant agricultural resources, notably asparagus and blueberries. The valley rises up on both sides of the Chao River.

== Description ==
It is mainly an agricultural zone that is part of the Chavimochic project in its third stage.

== Localities in the valley ==
Some localities in Chao Valley are:

- Chao
- Guadalupito

== See also ==
- Chavimochic
- Trujillo
- Valley of Moche
- Viru Valley
- Jequetepeque Valley
