= Redress (charitable organisation) =

UK-based human rights organisation

- Formation: December 1992
- Legal status: Charitable organisation
- Purpose: Seeking reparations for torture survivors
- Headquarters: London and The Hague
- Region served: UK and International
- Official language: English (also Arabic, French, Spanish, German)
- Director: Rupert Skilbeck
- Affiliations: Victims' Rights Working Group (VRWG)
- Budget: £800,000
- Staff: 12
- Volunteers: 4
- Website: redress.org

Redress, or The Redress Trust, is a human rights organisation based in London, England, that helps survivors of torture to obtain justice and reparation, in the form of compensation, rehabilitation, official acknowledgement of the wrong and formal apologies. In addition Redress seek accountability for those who have been tortured.

== Services ==
Redress provides legal and related support in obtaining legal reparations, promote survivors' rights in international and regional courts and tribunals and promotes survivors’ rights in national policy and practice contexts in the United Kingdom.

In 2008 Redress was addressing torture and related crimes in more than 50 countries in all regions or the world and having over 50 active case files relating to more than 957 survivors.

== History ==
Redress was founded in 1992 by Keith Carmichael, a British torture survivor who sought justice for how he had been treated while a prisoner in Saudi Arabia from November 1981 until March 1984. After his release, Carmichael found that while the existing non-governmental organisations advocated for the release of prisoners, provided medical attention, and operated safe havens, none existed to seek reparations under international law. Redress was founded to fill that gap.

== Supporters ==
Redress is supported by the United Nations, the European Commission, Oxfam, the Joseph Rowntree Charitable Trust, UK Department for International Development DFID, Bromley Trust, John D. and Catherine T. MacArthur Foundation, Oak Foundation, City Parochial Foundation.
