= Malabrigo (Peru) =

Malabrigo Puerto Chicama
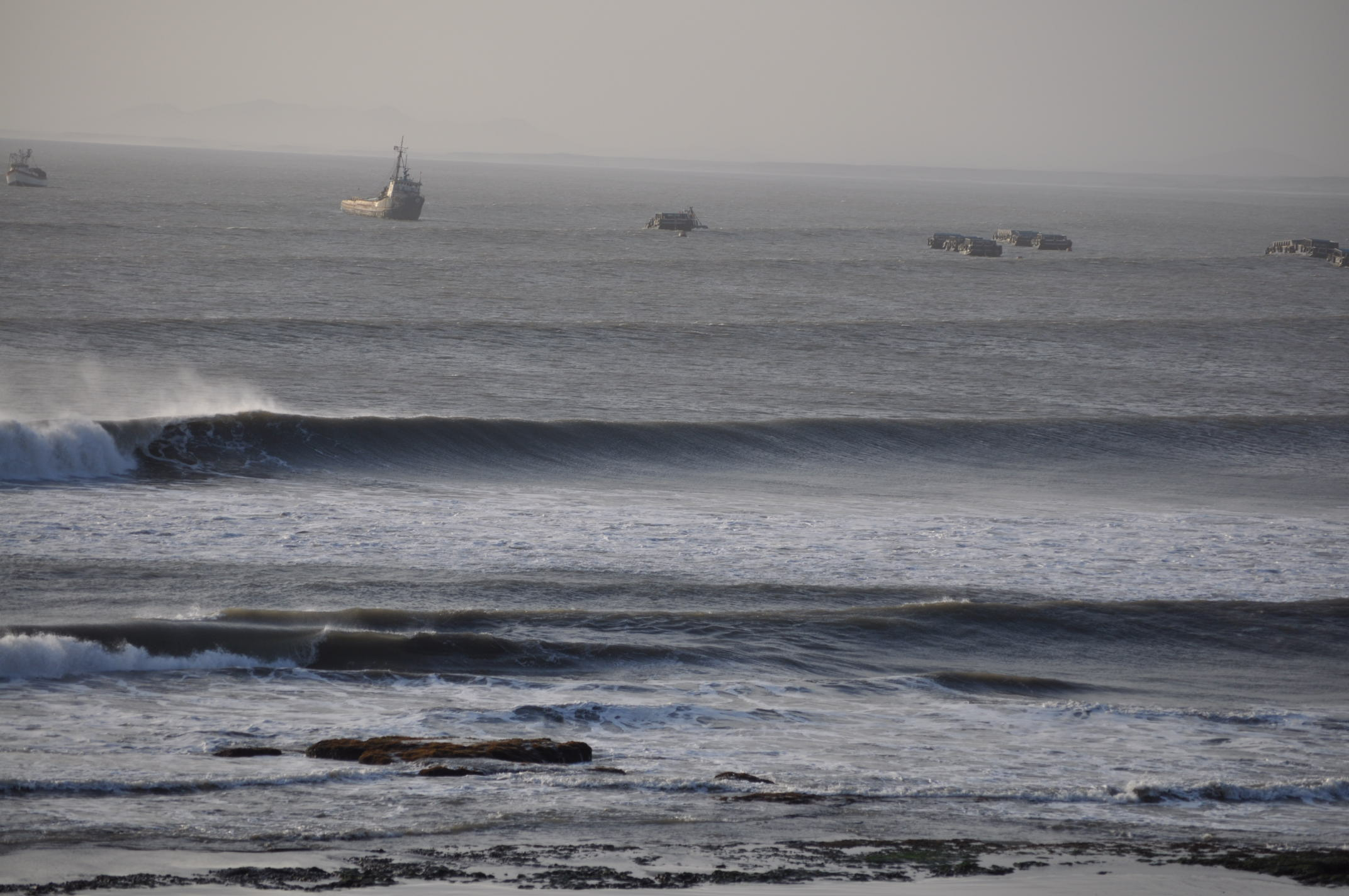
- Malabrigo Beach

- Location within Peru
- Coordinates: 7°42.0′S 79°26.0′W
- Country: Peru
- Region: La Libertad Region
- Province: Ascope
- District: Razuri

Government
  - Mayor: David Valderrama Paredes
- Elevation: 12 m (39 ft)

Population (2005)
  - Demonym: Malabrigueño (a)
- Time zone: UTC-5 (PET)

Malabrigo also called unofficially Puerto Chicama, is a port and small coastal city in northwestern Peru, located in La Libertad Region, some 70 km north of Trujillo city. The town is home to the Chicama wave, the first legally protected wave in the world, as well as the world's longest left-breaking wave—see External Links.

== Chicama waves ==
Locals have called the waves at Chicama, from the top of the Cape to the pier over a distance of about 4 km, "Malpaso", "Keys", "The Point", and "El Hombre". At other times other names have been given, but these are the names from locals as of 2005. "The Point" is considered the best part of the wave and is the most famous, which will break for around 1 km up to about 6 feet in size (Hawaiian scale), but to ride longer than this all the way to the pier (about 2.2 km) on a single wave needs a swell >6 feet, which is quite rare. The wave is well-shaped, fast and moderately hollow, breaking over soft sand, but not a genuine tube, nor very powerful, unless the swell is very big (e.g. >6 feet). The bigger the waves, generally the better the wave, and the main point will hold at least 10 feet Hawaiian scale (i.e. about 20 feet faces). The wave tends to speed up and slow down alternately, and it is rare to ride a single wave along the length of the point for this reason. There is also a middle section along the point which is rocky, generally hollower, but also fast and difficult to make after about 1000m, but locals claim to have achieved a single ride all the way to the pier, for a distance of about 2.2 km, in 10 foot swells. Even this distance is not as long as the length of the pointbreak at nearby Pacasmayo, which is at least 2.5 km long, and which has also been claimed by locals to have been ridden all the way along on a single wave, on very large swells.

== Surf in Malabrigo ==
Winds at Malabrigo are consistently offshore, but the swell is notoriously inconsistent. It needs a good swell to break properly, and days above head high are relatively rare. As a guide, wave sizes at the main point are around half the size of open ocean swell charts, and waves less than about 4 feet on the point (i.e. 8 feet on the swell charts) tend to be quite weak and slow. Best surfing is from around Easter Week (Semana Santa) and through the winter months in the Southern Hemisphere to about September when great storms in the Roaring Forties direct their wave energy toward Peru. The water is cool (17–22 °C), like much of Peru, due to cold currents from the south. Climate is warm and springlike (15–28 °C), however wind chill is a factor, created by the venturi effects from the headland. A 2–3 mm wetsuit is recommended as well as booties for walking up the beach.

Malabrigo is about 560 km north of Lima by air, or 94 km (an hour-and-a-half drive) northwest of the city of Trujillo. is reached by taking 15 km detour at Paiján, at Kilometer 614 of the North Pan-American Highway. Various tour operators, expedition outfitters, and guides are available to take you there. There are buses and collective taxis from Lima and Trujillo. Primitive lodging and food are available in Malabrigo. A high-end resort called Chicama Surf Resort has also opened for surfers right on the point. Many modern conveniences can be found in the City of Trujillo (Visit Huanchaco to see traditional fishermen riding the waves on reed fishing boats called "Caballitos de Totora", perhaps oldest form of surfing still practiced to this day).

== See also ==
- Ascope Province
- Ascope
- Chicama Valley
