= Virú province =

Coordinates: 8.424945°S 78.779773°W

Virú
- Province
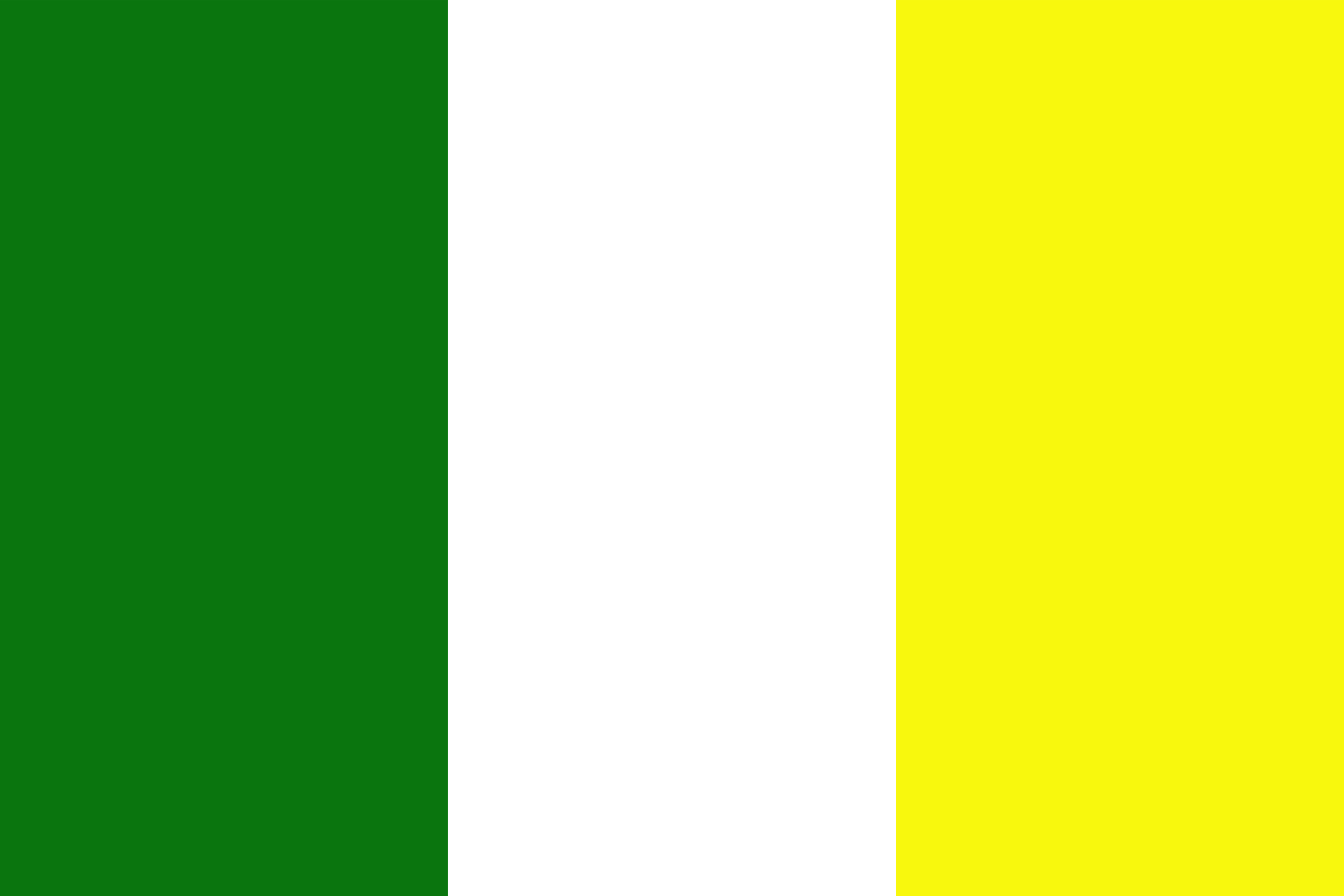
- Flag Coat of arms

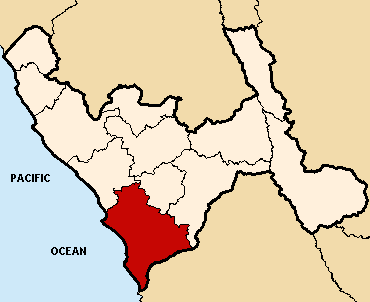
- Location of Virú in La Libertad Region
- Country: Peru
- Region: La Libertad
- Capital: Virú

Government
  - Mayor: Roger Cruz Alarcon (2007)

Area
  - Total: 3,218.74 km^{2} (1,242.76 sq mi)

Population
  - Total: 67,775
  - Density: 21.056/km^{2} (54.536/sq mi)
- UBIGEO: 1312
- Website: www.muniproviru.gob.pe

Virú is one of twelve provinces of the La Libertad Region in Peru. The capital of the province is Virú.

== Political division ==
The province is divided into three districts, which are:

- Chao
- Guadalupito
- Virú
