= Virú =

- Town
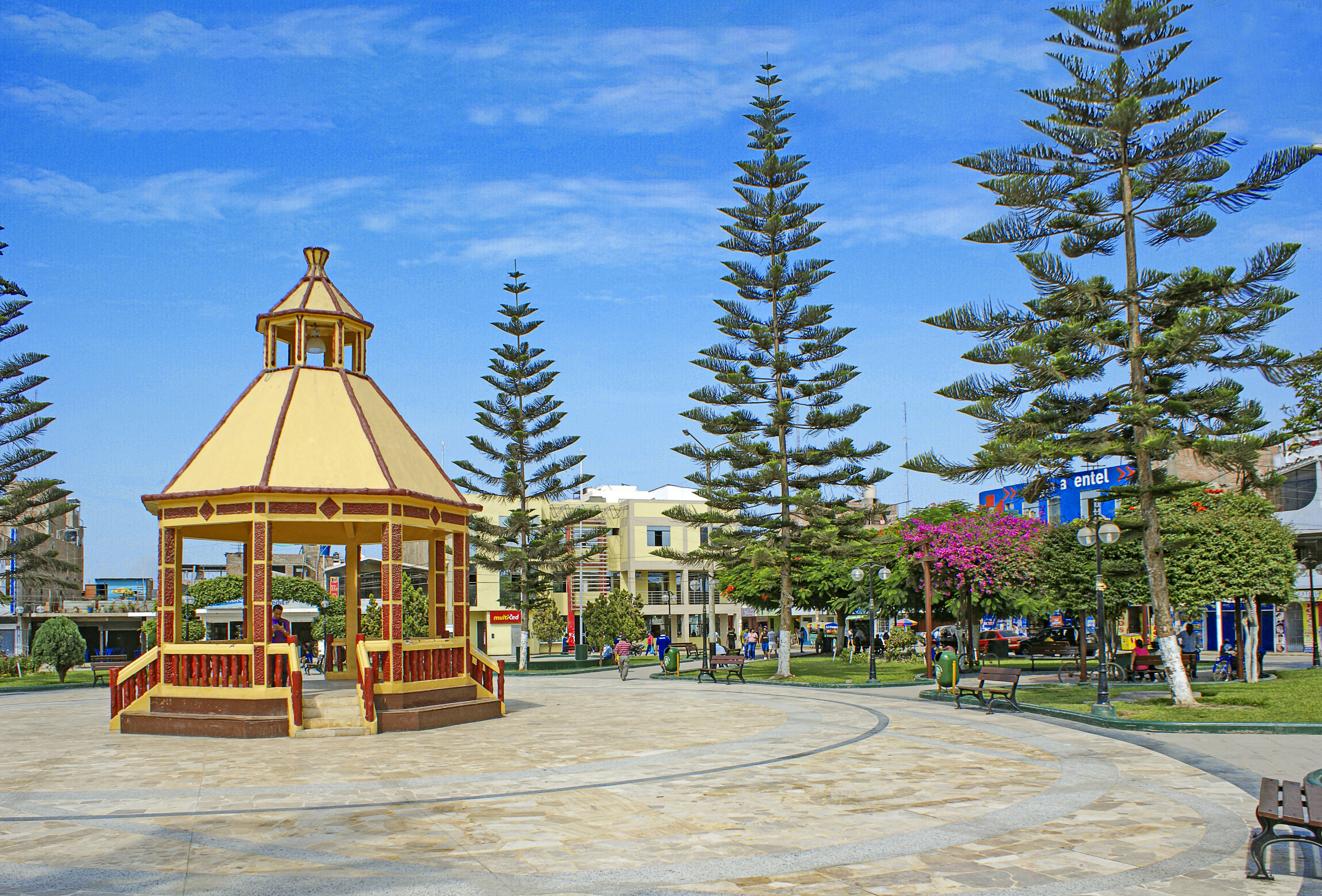
- Main plaza of Virú

- Location within Peru
- Coordinates: 8°24′51.59″S 78°45′8.50″W
- Country: Peru
- Region: La Libertad
- Province: Virú
- District: Virú

Government
  - Mayor: Ney Gámez
- Time zone: UTC-5 (PET)

Virú is a town in Northern Peru, capital of the province Virú in the region La Libertad. This town is located 48 km south of Trujillo city and is primarily an agricultural center in the Viru Valley.

In the 1960s, around 850 families lived in the town. Around 60% of the population worked in agriculture while the remaining 40% worked in shops and services. The town had a movie theater, a hospital and a secondary school.

== See also ==
- Virú Valley
- Chao
- Virú District
