= Chicama Valley =

Valley in Peru

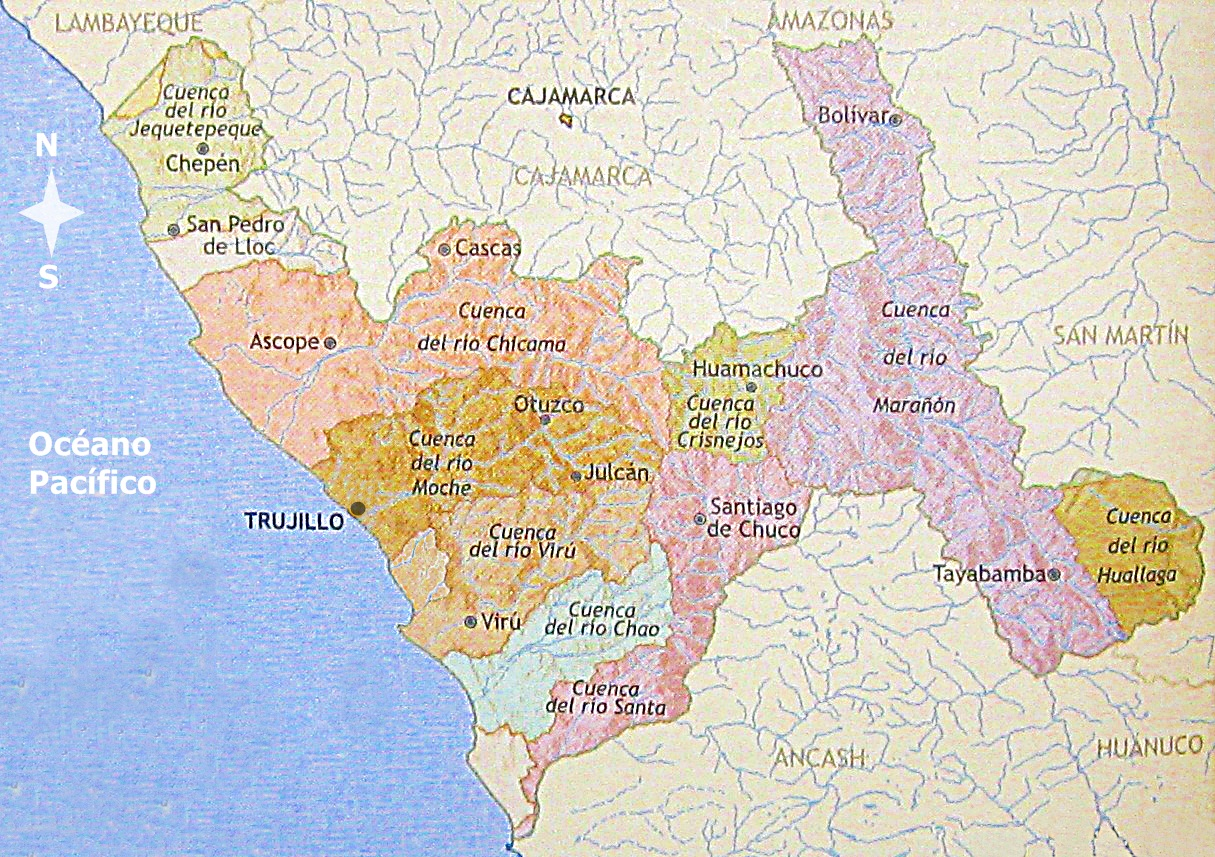
The Chicama valley is located north of the Valley of Moche

Chicama Valley is an area located north of the Valley of Moche in La Libertad Region, northern Peru; it has agricultural resources where one of the main products is sugar cane; this valley was formed on both sides of the Chicama River.

== Description ==
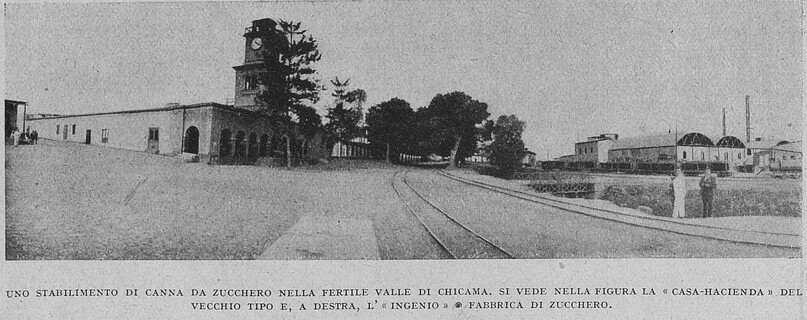
Decauville railway at a sugar mill in the fertile Chicama Valley with an old-style 'Casa-Hacienda' and the 'Ingenio' on the right

Mainly, it is an agricultural zone, part of the Chavimochic project in its third stage.

== Archaeological finds ==
In February 2026, the Chicama Archaeological Program announced several discoveries, including a massive two-kilometer-long geoglyph, a ceremonial temple, and a 100-hectare agricultural complex.

== Locations ==
Some places in the valley are:

- Ascope
- Puerto Chicama
- Casas Grandes
- Cascas
- El Brujo
- Huaca Prieta

== See also ==
- Trujillo
- Valley of Moche
- Viru Valley
- Chao Valley
