= Chavimochic =

Irrigation system in Peru

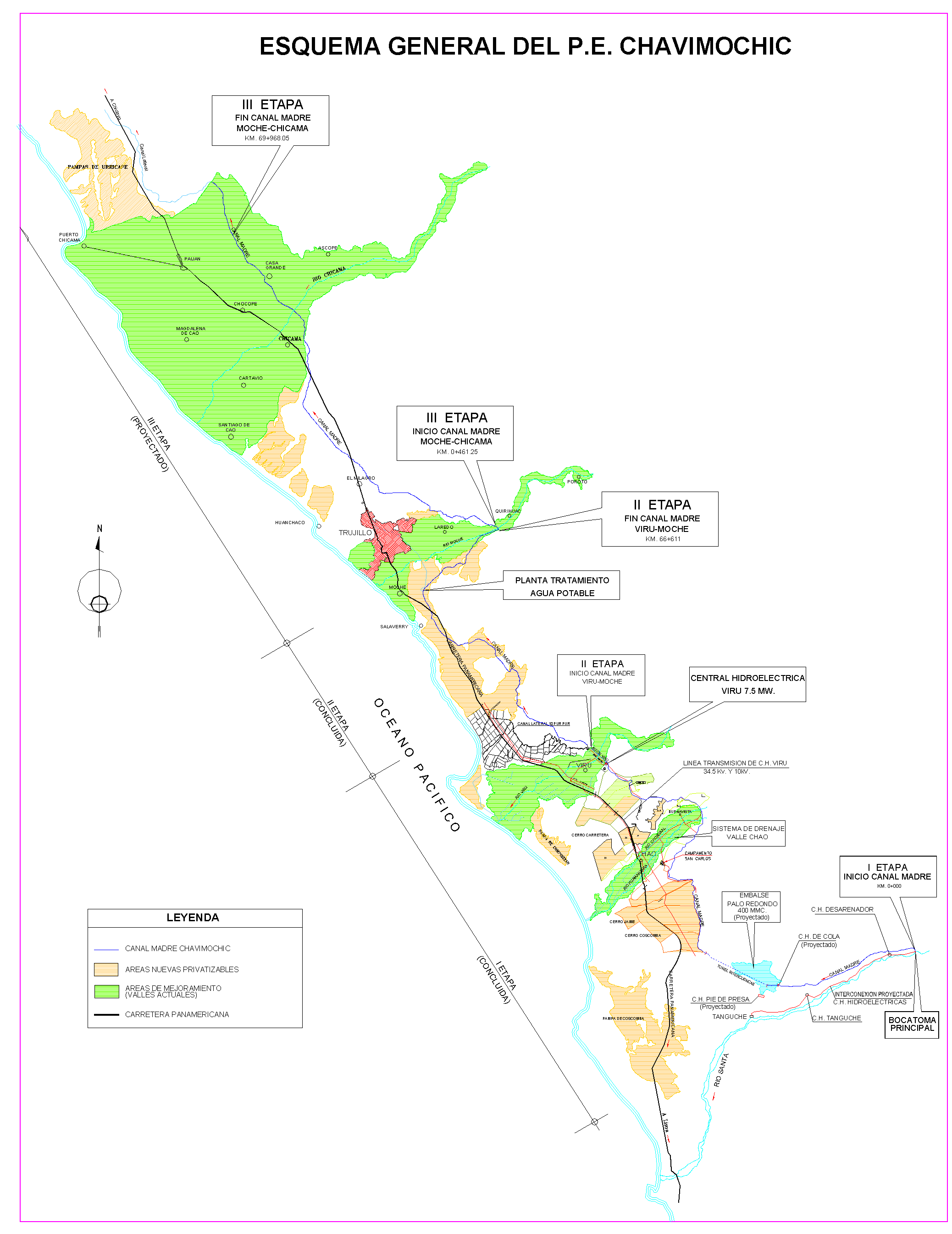
Scheme of Chavimochic Project

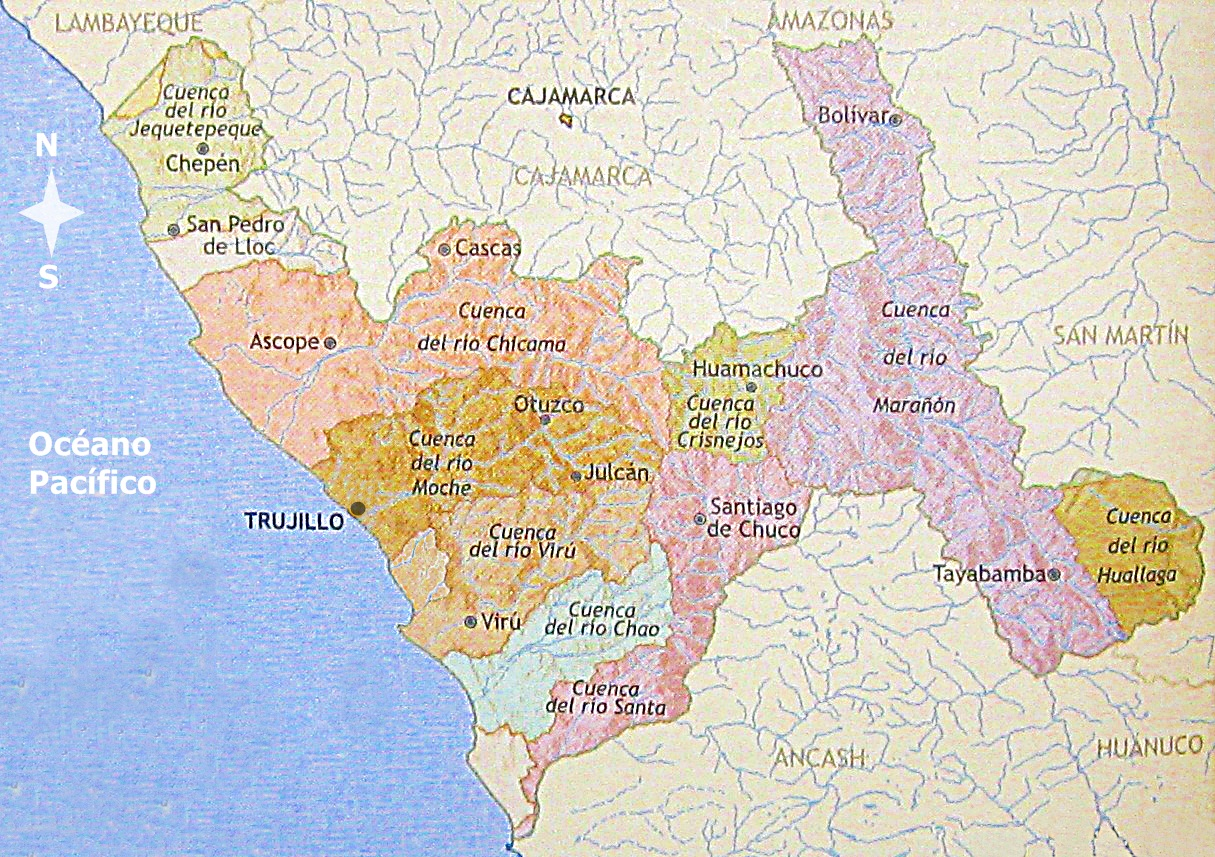
Chavimochic is designed to irrigate the valleys of Chao, Viru, Moche and Chicama.

Chavimochic Special Project is an irrigation system that extends throughout much of the coast of the La Libertad Region, on the north coast of Peru. It was started in the 1960s by the National Development Institute (INADE), a Peruvian central government agency. In 2003, its administration was transferred to Regional Government of La Libertad.

== Origin of the Name ==
Chavimochic is an acronym formed by the first syllables or graphemes of the names of the four valleys that cross the Madre Canal of the project, these are: Chao, Viru, Moche and Chicama.

== The third stage ==
In 2012, it has been managing the construction of the third and final stage of CHAVIMOCHIC to irrigate land in the Chicama Valley, north of Trujillo. This stage includes more extensive and fertile region of La Libertad and therefore demand an investment of approximately U.S. $ 825 million, to be financed by the Regional Government and the private sector. Its implementation has been a major step in the development of the La Libertad region, and also it will enhance the economic strength that has taken the region in the last decade.

== See also ==
- La Libertad Region
- Valley of Moche
- Viru Valley
- Chicama Valley
- Chao Valley
