= Viru Valley =

Valley in La Libertad, Peru

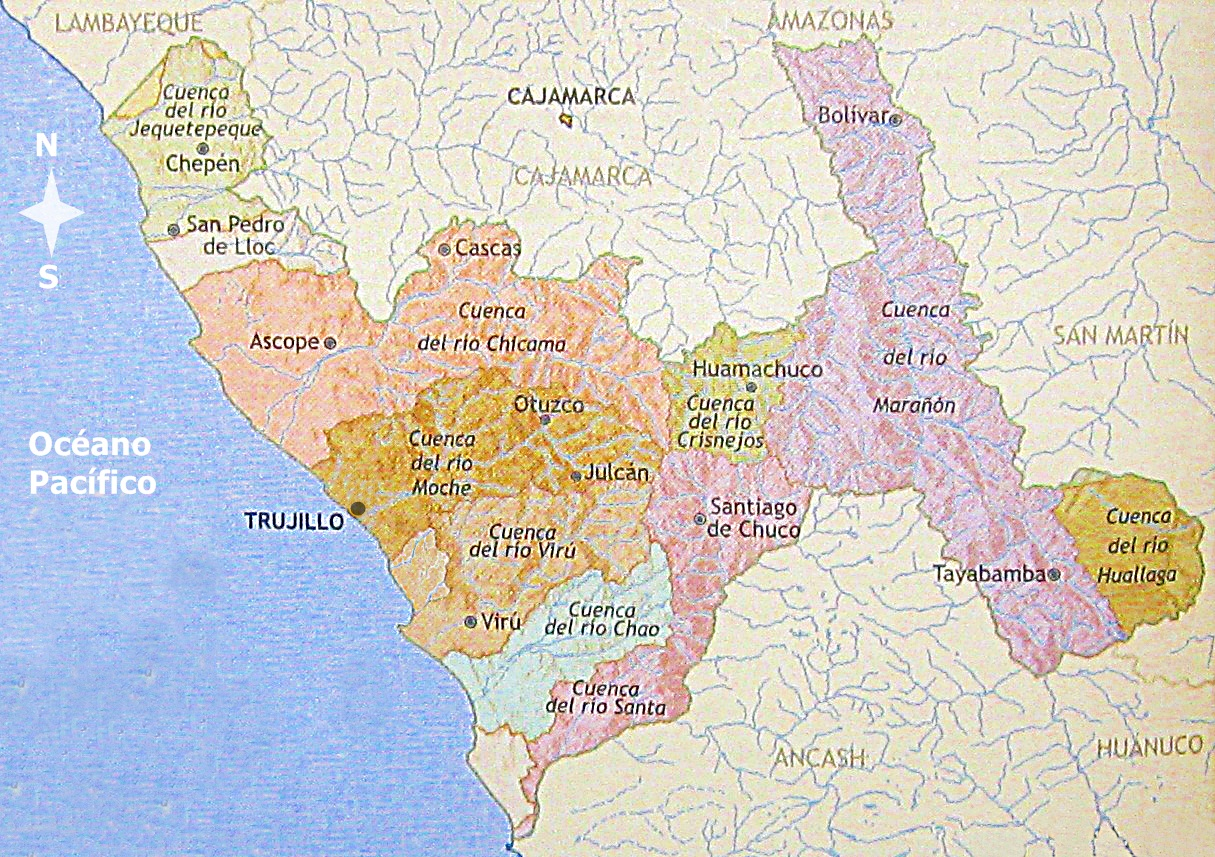
Viru valley is located at north of Chao Valley

The Viru Valley is located in La Libertad Region on the northwest coast of Peru.

== The Viru Valley Project ==
In 1946 the first attempt to study settlement patterns in the Americas took place in the Viru Valley, led by Gordon Willey. Rather than examine individual settlement sites, Willey wanted to look at the valley as a whole and the way that each village interacted with the others. The study showed that villages were located in places which reflected their relationship with the wider landscape and their neighbours. The project emphasised the importance for archaeologists of viewing sites holistically and to take into account the economic, environmental, social and political factors acting on past societies.

Willey's groundbreaking study stimulated the work of a number of subsequent archaeologists in the valley. From 1992 to 1998 Dr. Thomas A. Zoubek embarked on a study of the earliest mid and upper valley sites in Viru concentrating specifically at the sites of Huaca El Gallo/La Gallina of Virú culture, in the El Niño Quebrada. These excavations and later ones in the Susanga region completely redefined our knowledge of the earliest agricultural societies in the valley and resulted in the discovery of the earliest ceramics found in coastal Peru that have been dated to c. 2400 BCE.

== Notable people ==
- Julio Castillo Narváez (? –2011), producer and radio news program host, murdered in Viru.

== See also ==
- Virú culture
- Chavimochic
- Chao Valley
- Moche valley
- Chicama Valley
- Jequetepeque Valley
