= List of districts of La Libertad Region =

The following is a list of districts of La Libertad Region by population of census 2007 and estimated population for year 2014 according to INEI.

Nº	Image	District	Capital of district	Census 2007	Population 2014
Districts of Trujillo Province
1		Trujillo	Trujillo (also capital of province)	294.899	317.893
2		El Porvenir	El Porvenir	140.507	180.716
3		La Esperanza	La Esperanza	151.845	179.407
4		Huanchaco	Huanchaco	44.806	64.957
5		Víctor Larco	Buenos Aires	55.781	63.317
6		Florencia de Mora	Florencia de Mora	40.014	41.950
7		Laredo	Laredo	32.825	35.200
8		Moche	Moche	29.727	34.074
9		Salaverry	Salaverry	13.892	17.633
10		Simbal	Simbal	4.082	4.315
11		Poroto	Poroto	3.601	3.267
Districts of Ascope Province
12		Casa Grande	Casa Grande	29.884	31.204
13		Paiján	Paiján	23.194	25.424
14		Santiago de Cao	Santiago de Cao	19.731	19.797
15		Chicama	Chicama	15.056	15.535
16		Chocope	Chocope	10.138	9.568
17		Rázuri	Puerto Chicama	8.330	9.037
18		Ascope	Ascope (also capital of province)	7.012	6.763
19		Magdalena de Cao	Magdalena de Cao	2.884	3.206
Districts of Bolívar Province
20		Bolívar	Bolívar (also capital of province)	4.751	4.859
21		Bambamarca	Bambamarca	3.537	3.849
22		Uchumarca	Uchumarca	2.888	2.794
23		Longotea	Longotea	2.306	2.256
24		Condormarca	Condormarca	2.222	2.096
25		Ucuncha	Ucuncha	946	836
Districts of Chepén Province
26		Chepén	Chepén (also capital of province)	45.639	48.503
27		Pacanga	Pacanga	17.976	22.972
28		Pueblo Nuevo	Pueblo Nuevo	12.365	14.556
Districts of Julcán Province
29		Julcán	Julcán (also capital of province)	13.012	11.909
30		Carabamba	Carabamba	7.104	6.636
31		Calamarca	Calamarca	6.446	5.792
32		Huaso	Huaso	6.423	7.192
Districts of Otuzco Province
33		Usquil	Usquil	26.268	27.409
34		Otuzco	Otuzco (also capital of province)	25.265	27.164
35		Agallpampa	Agallpampa	9.802	9.916
36		Sinsicap	Sinsicap	8.271	8.631
37		Salpo	Salpo	6.437	6.219
38		Huaranchal	Huaranchal	5.087	5.112
39		Mache	Mache	3.195	3.143
40		Charat	Charat	3.095	2.896
41		La Cuesta	La Cuesta	708	694
42		Paranday	Paranday	689	729
Districts of Pacasmayo Province
43		Guadalupe	Guadalupe	37.239	43.310
44		Pacasmayo	Pacasmayo	26.118	27.431
45		San Pedro de Lloc	San Pedro de Lloc (also capital of province)	16.149	16.581
46		San José	San José	11.414	12.225
47		Jequetepeque	Jequetepeque	3.457	3.784
Districts of Pataz Province
48		Parcoy	Parcoy	16.437	21.164
49		Tayabamba	Tayabamba (also capital of province)	13.785	14.584
50		Chillia	Chillia	12.043	13.310
51		Pataz	Pataz	7.410	8.671
52		Huancaspata	Huancaspata	6.352	6.430
53		Huayo	Huayo	4.145	4.371
54		Buldibuyo	Buldibuyo	3.836	3.800
55		Urpay	Urpay	3.019	2.849
56		Taurija	Taurija	3.002	3.026
57		Santiago de Challas	Santiago de Challas	2.797	2.585
58		Huaylillas	Huaylillas	2.338	3.360
59		Ongón	Ongón	1.694	1.767
60		Pías	Pías	1.525	1.351
Districts of Sánchez Carrión Province
61		Huamachuco	Huamachuco (also capital of province)	52.459	61.423
62		Chugay	Chugay	17.236	18.667
63		Marcabal	Marcabal	14.807	16.544
64		Sanagorán	Sanagorán	12.983	14.693
65		Sartimbamba	Sartimbamba	12.648	13.637
66		Sarín	Sarín	9.156	9.901
67		Cochorco	Aricapampa	8.751	9.321
68		Curgos	Curgos	8.181	8.534
Districts of Santiago de Chuco Province
69		Santiago de Chuco	Santiago de Chuco (also capital of province)	19.860	20.441
70		Quiruvilca	Quiruvilca	14.060	14.359
71		Cachicadán	Cachicadán	6.663	7.835
72		Angasmarca	Angasmarca	6.052	7.144
73		Sitabamba	Sitabamba	3.754	3.478
74		Santa Cruz de Chuca	Santa Cruz de Chuca	3.228	3.213
75		Mollepata	Mollepata	2.748	2.694
76		Mollebamba	Mollebamba	1.955	2.277
Districts of Gran Chimú Province
77		Cascas	Cascas (also capital of province)	14.191	14.284
78		Marmot	Marmot	7.993	2.172
79		Sayapullo	Sayapullo	5.774	7.972
80		Lucma	Lucma	2.441	6.787
Districts of Virú Province
81		Virú	Virú (also capital of province)	47.652	64.752
82		Chao	Chao	22.826	37.681
83		Guadalupito	Guadalupito	6.232	9.126
Total Region				1.617.050	1.836.960

== See also ==
- List of metropolitan areas of Peru
- Demographics of Peru
- La Libertad Region
