= La Cuesta District =

La Cuesta District may refer to:

- La Cuesta District, Otuzco, in Otuzco province, La Libertad region, Peru
- La Cuesta District, Corredores, in Corredores Canton, Puntarenas province, Costa Rica
