= Bambamarca District, Bolívar =

Bambamarca Pampamarka
- District
- Interactive map of Bambamarca
- Country: Peru
- Region: La Libertad
- Province: Bolívar
- Capital: Bambamarca

Government
  - Mayor: Carlos Alberto Peche Quiñones

Area
  - Total: 165.2 km^{2} (63.8 sq mi)
- Elevation: 3,525 m (11,565 ft)

Population (2017)
  - Total: 2,908
  - Density: 17.60/km^{2} (45.59/sq mi)
- Time zone: UTC-5 (PET)
- UBIGEO: 130302

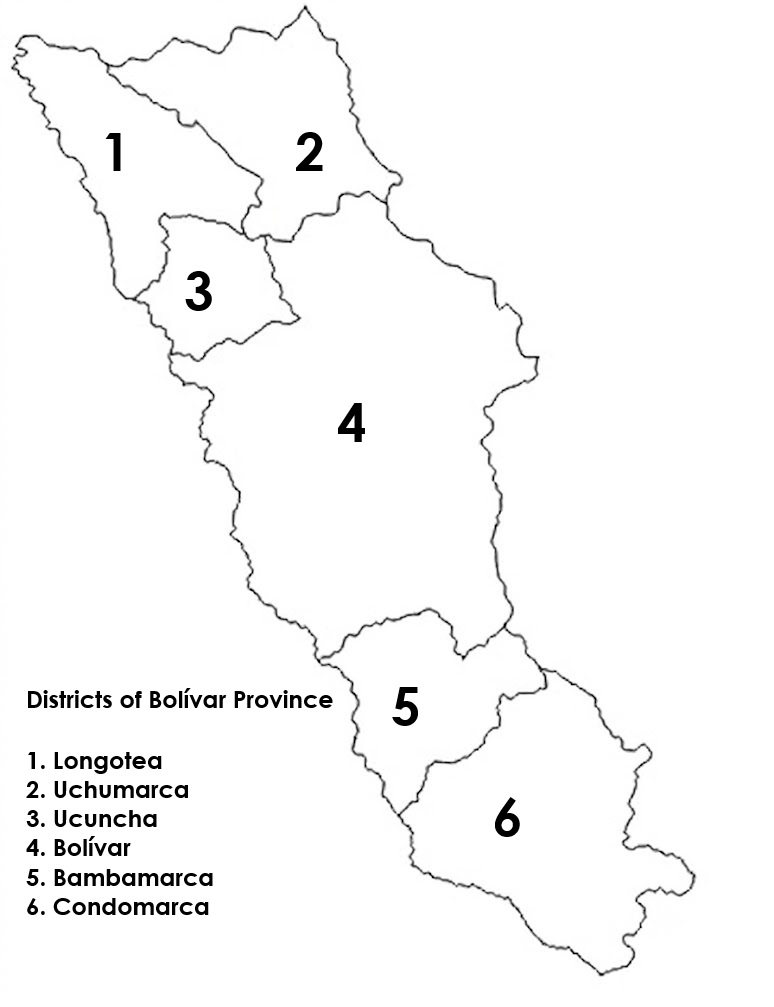
Districts of Bolívar Province

Bambamarca or Pampamarka (Quechua pampa a large plain, marka village) is one of six districts of Bolívar Province, Peru. It lays between Bolívar District to its north, and Condormarca District to its south.

The district had a population of 2,908 in the 2017 Peruvian census. The most populated village was the district capital of Bambamarca, with 650 people.
