= Bolívar province, Peru =

Coordinates: 7°21′47″S 77°50′24″W

Bolívar
- Province
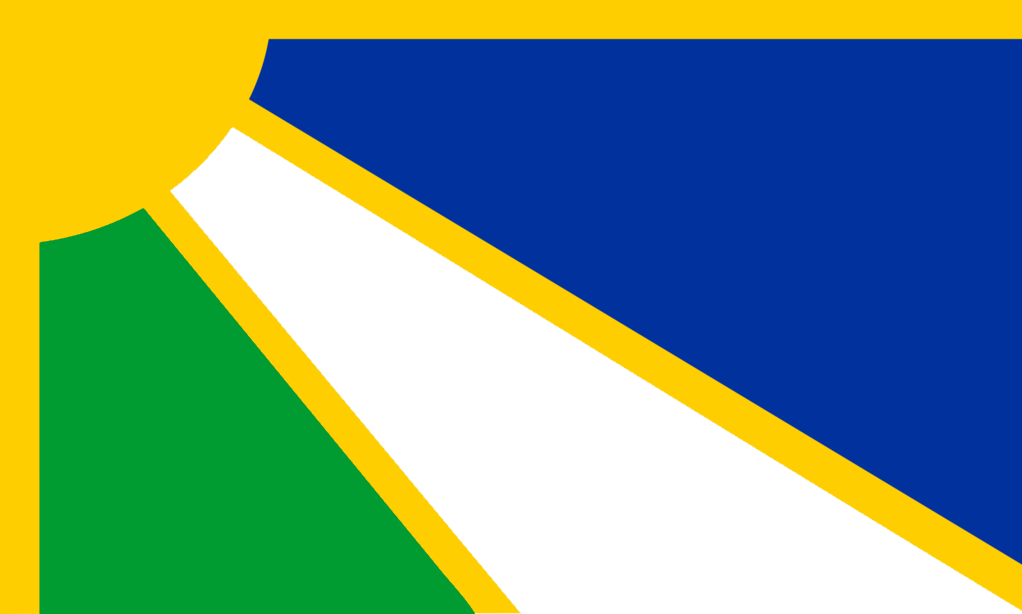
- Flag

- Location of Bolívar in La Libertad Region
- Country: Peru
- Region: La Libertad
- Capital: Bolívar

Government
  - Mayor: Carlos Alberto Peche Quiñones

Area
  - Total: 1,718.86 km^{2} (663.66 sq mi)
- Elevation: 3,525 m (11,565 ft)

Population
  - Total: 14,457 (2,017)
  - Density: 8.4108/km^{2} (21.784/sq mi)
- UBIGEO: 1303

Bolívar is a province located in the La Libertad Region of Peru. It is one of the twelve provinces that make up that region.

== History ==
The province was created in November 1916 under the name Caxamarquilla (Cajamarquilla), and was formed by splitting off a part of Pataz province, and creating new districts, to make a total of six districts. The province was renamed Bolívar in 1925, and the capital city was renamed from Cajamarquilla to Bolívar in 1940.

The province population reported in the 2017 Peruvian census was 14,457, making it the least populated province in the Department of La Libertad. The reported population in the 2007 census was 16,650.

== Boundaries ==
- North: Amazonas Region
- East: San Martín Region
- South: the province of Pataz
- West: the province of Sánchez Carrión and Cajamarca Region

== Political division ==
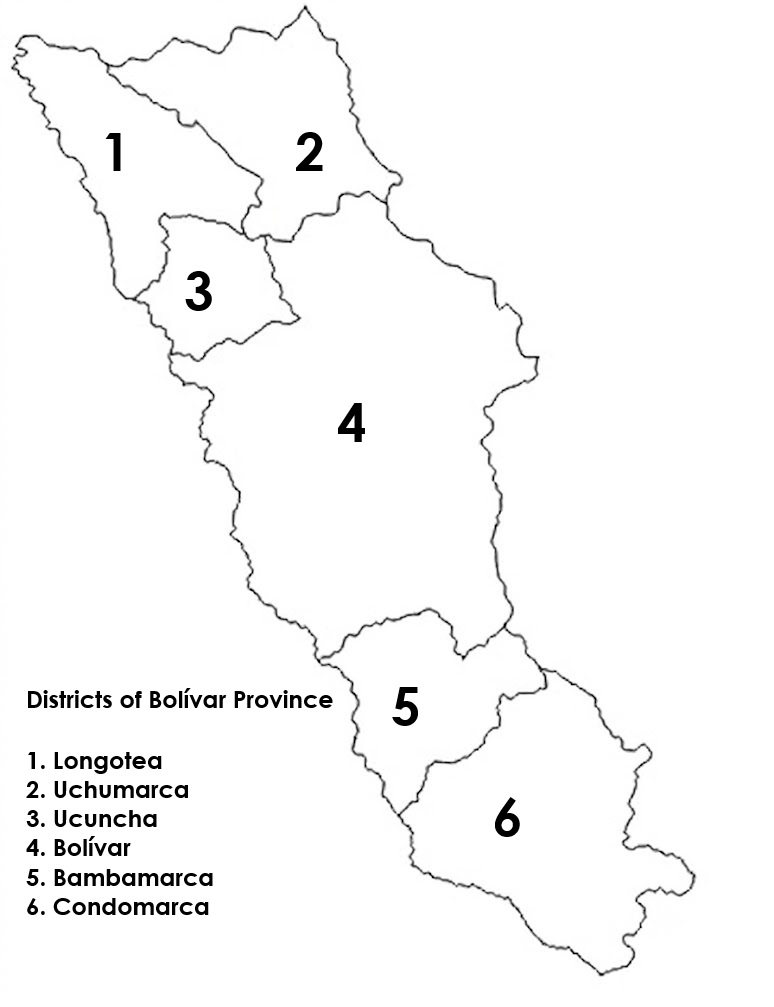

The province has an area of 1,718.86 square kilometers (663.66 sq mi) and is divided into six districts:

- Bolívar
- Bambamarca
- Condormarca
- Longotea
- Uchumarca
- Ucuncha

== Capital ==
The capital of this province is the city of Bolívar.

== See also ==
- Pirqa Pirqa
