= Otuzco =

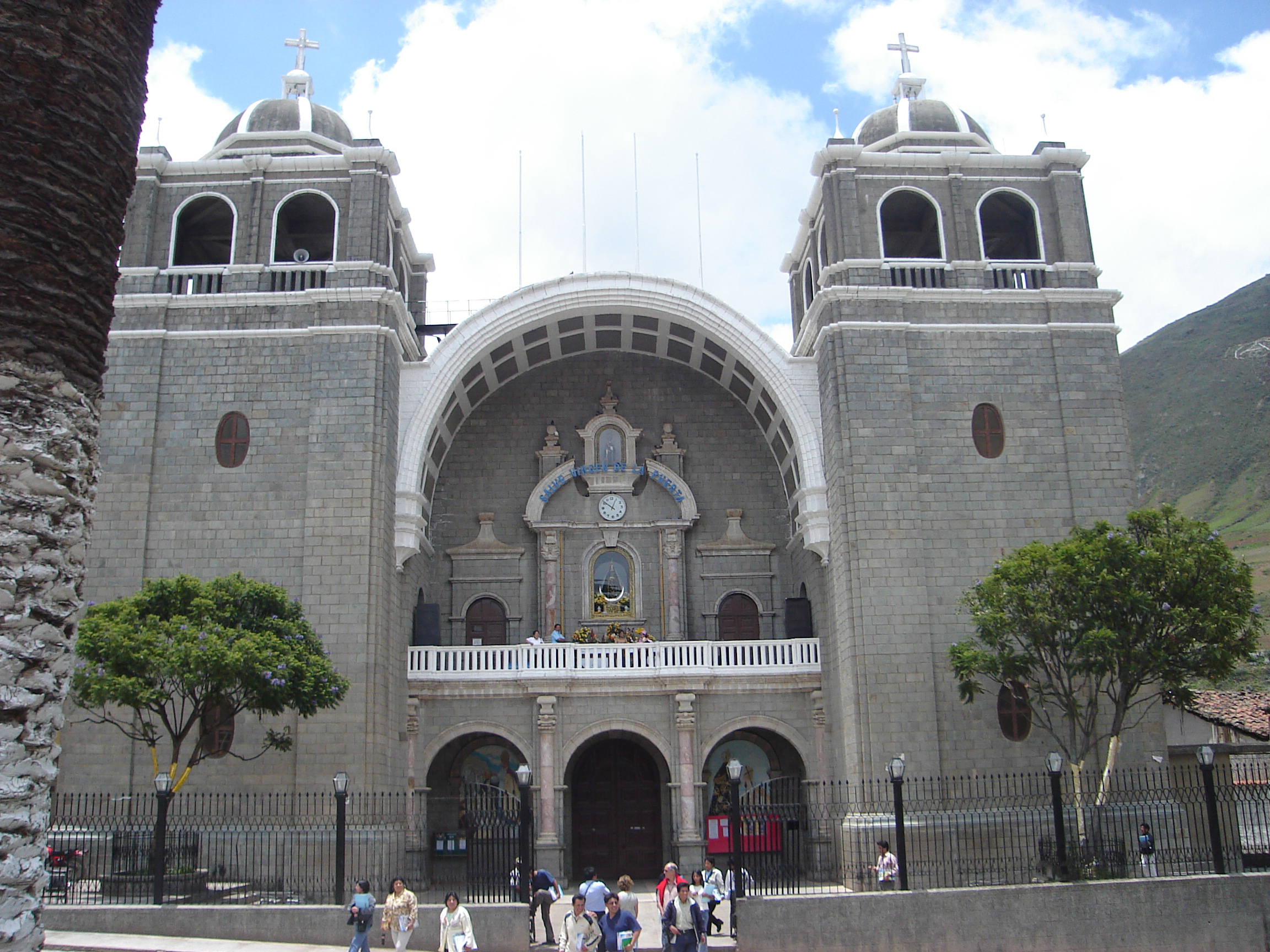
- The Cathedral of Otuzco
- Nickname: capital of faith
- Location within Peru
- Coordinates: 7°54.0′S 78°35.0′W
- Country: Peru
- Region: La Libertad Region
- Province: Otuzco Province
- Incorporated (city): November 15, 1890

Government
  - Mayor: Diómedes Veneros Orecho
- Elevation: 2,641 m (8,665 ft)

Population (2005)
  - Total: 25,134
  - Density: 56.6/km^{2} (147/sq mi)
  - Demonym: Otuzcan
- Time zone: UTC-5 (PET)

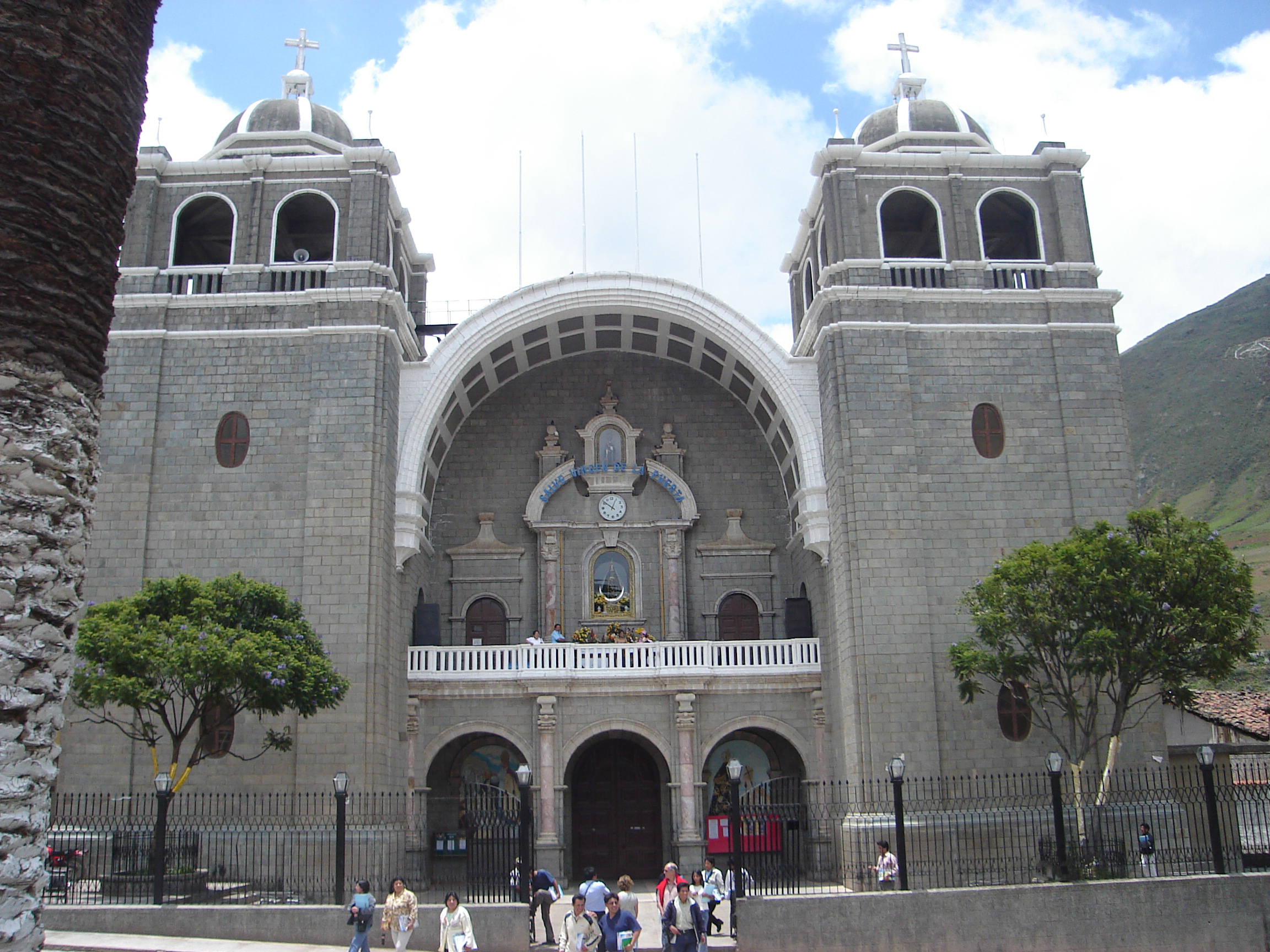
The cathedral

Otuzco is a city located in the highlands of La Libertad, Peru. It is the capital of the Otuzco Province, and it is well known because there is the sanctuary of the Virgen de la Puerta. It is located at around 7°54′00″S 78°35′0″W.

== Founding ==
The Otuzcans, led by Don José Corcuera (deputy for the Province of Huamachuco) and Don Enemecio Orbegozo (son of the former President Luis José de Orbegoso), who in 1856 proposed a Law Project, that was not accepted, later proposed a second Law Project, that was accepted by the National Congress on April 17, 1861, and called the "Law of Creation of the Otuzco Province", in the Department of La Libertad. This law was signed by the President of the Republic, Ramón Castilla, on April 25, 1861.

The same Law divided the Province of Huamachuco in two, and created the Province of Otuzco. This law made the town of Otuzco the capital of the Province of Otuzco; it was later reincorporated as a city.

== Otuzco and its surroundings ==
The Otuzcan area has been inhabited since the upcoming of the first human groups in the Region of La Libertad. It is an Andean city inhabited by descendants of the aboriginal people of Peru, who have mixed with the people who came from Spain ever since the first years of Spanish domination. The majority are mestizo. It was inhabited by the Yungas and the Quechuas.

Otuzco is a city in the La Libertad highlands with narrow streets and elevated houses of wide doors and tiled roofs. It is surrounded by the Andean landscape, which features the Tupullo Gorge, the Pollo River, and La Ermita mountain. Otuzco is much visited by religious pilgrims who come to pray to the Virgin de la Puerta (Virgin of the Gate), patron saint of the city.

Throughout its history, Otuzco has been reclassified many times, first it was just a name, later it became a parish, then a "curato", later a town until the declaration of the Republic. When the Province of Otuzco was created, the town of Otuzco was raised to the legal category of "Villa" (town). Now, it has the category of city, by a Law published on November 15, 1890.

== Geographical features ==
Most of the land in and around Otuzco is steep, mountainous terrain presenting diverse geographical features such as rugged valleys, numerous steep hills, deep gorges and many narrow fast flowing river canyons. Throughout the mountains of Otuzco there are hundreds of dirt tracks, which are the primary transportation routes for the people who live in the small communities dotted throughout these mountains. Due to the mountainous terrain the main means of transportation for the people of these communities are donkeys; people and donkeys traverse these narrow, high mountain tracks every day as they go about their daily lives. Within a few kilometers of Otuzco the land changes from hard, rocky terrain to the warm, almost tropical fertile lower valleys that are famous for their year-round cultivation of pineapples and sugar cane.

== The festival of the Virgin De La Puerta ==
The Virgin de la Puerta is the religious patron saint of Otuzco. The festival of the Virgin of La Puerta, celebrated in Otuzco during the second week of December, is one of the most important religious holidays in South America, and attracts thousands of devotees accompanying the statue of the Virgin during its journey through the streets. For a whole week, religious pilgrims of all ages walk the 73 kilometers from the city of Trujillo up through the mountains till they reach the city of Otuzco. The purpose of the pilgrimage is for believers to test their faith through the undertaking of this difficult journey. The festival consists of three nights of celebrations accompanied by fireworks, traditional hot air balloons, and more than twenty bands which play haunting traditional music. Highlights of the festival are the groups of dancers who dress as gypsies, African Slaves, pallas, coyas and devils. Another popular tradition is the race of the donkeys called "BurroCross" where the men show their dexterity and control with their donkeys by racing through the streets and the mountain tracks in and around Otuzco.The week of festivities ends on 15 December when three-story-high bamboo castles of fireworks are lit.

== Economy ==
The economy of Otuzco is based around wheat, potatoes, livestock and its traditional baked products. While a certain percentage of these products are sold within Otuzco, the remainder are transported to Trujillo where they are sold in the markets. Traditionally, once these products are sold, the proceeds are used to buy new products such as clothing, shoes, electrical goods, vegetables etc. which are then sold in the markets of Otuzco. As Otuzco is a small mountain community with a basic, self-sufficient economy, cash is the usual method of payment, there are no large banks or automated teller machines.

== Communication ==
In recent years, Electricity, mobile phone towers and the internet have slowly spread throughout the mountain areas surrounding Otuzco. While there may be some areas without signal due to the mountains, mobile phone coverage is relatively widespread in and around the town and several internet cafes operate within Otuzco.

== Transportation to Otuzco ==
The 1 1/2 to 2 hour journey to Otuzco starts from the city of Trujillo, the capital of La Libertad. Transportation to Otuzco includes regular buses, Micros (Small buses) and colectivos (Cars with individual paying passengers). The transportation ranges from low cost, basic buses to reasonably priced modern buses. The quickest method of transportation is colectivos but these can sometimes be the most dangerous as they generally travel at a higher speed through the winding mountain roads. All companies operating services to Otuzco leave from Avenida Union, a main road approximately 5 kilometers from downtown Trujillo. Once travellers arrive at Avenida Union, they just need to choose the company that they wish to travel with. The road to Otuzco is a modern, asphalt road that is generally well maintained.

== Tourism ==
Otuzco is a traditional mountain community. Unlike Cuzco, which has been transformed into a commercial tourist destination, Otuzco has remained relatively traditional with people still going about their daily lives as they have for generations. It is 73 kilometers from the city of Trujillo, accessible by bus for a day trip. There are also several hotels. Otuzco is surrounded by mountains and gorges.

== Education ==
Education in Otuzco is mostly supplied by the state, although a few private schools and colleges have started to open up in recent years. Government education in Peru has not been good, once being called the worst in Latin America. In recent years the Peruvian economy has grown and been successful, and the government has increased its investment in education; this can be seen in small towns such as Otuzco where computers, books and materials are now being made available to children. The government has also invested heavily in the expansion, renovation and modernization of government schools in isolated communities such as those in and around Otuzco. There is little doubt that continued investment, both Government and private in Education will have a continued positive impact on the mountain populations.

(mestizo).

== Climate ==
Climate data for Otuzco (Virgen de la Puerta), elevation 2,620 m (8,600 ft), (1990–2009)
| Month | Jan | Feb | Mar | Apr | May | Jun | Jul | Aug | Sep | Oct | Nov | Dec | Year |
|---|---|---|---|---|---|---|---|---|---|---|---|---|---|
| Mean daily maximum °C (°F) | 19.5 (67.1) | 18.9 (66.0) | 18.5 (65.3) | 19.2 (66.6) | 19.3 (66.7) | 19.6 (67.3) | 20.5 (68.9) | 20.9 (69.6) | 20.7 (69.3) | 20.4 (68.7) | 20.0 (68.0) | 19.4 (66.9) | 19.7 (67.5) |
| Mean daily minimum °C (°F) | 8.4 (47.1) | 8.1 (46.6) | 8.1 (46.6) | 8.0 (46.4) | 7.2 (45.0) | 5.9 (42.6) | 5.2 (41.4) | 5.3 (41.5) | 6.4 (43.5) | 7.7 (45.9) | 7.6 (45.7) | 7.7 (45.9) | 7.1 (44.8) |
| Average precipitation mm (inches) | 59.4 (2.34) | 90.7 (3.57) | 126.0 (4.96) | 95.1 (3.74) | 24.4 (0.96) | 11.6 (0.46) | 1.8 (0.07) | 4.6 (0.18) | 17.7 (0.70) | 32.6 (1.28) | 41.8 (1.65) | 36.5 (1.44) | 542.2 (21.35) |
| Average relative humidity (%) | 73.4 | 78.3 | 78.9 | 77.7 | 71.7 | 67.1 | 61.4 | 60.6 | 63.4 | 66.2 | 66.2 | 69.7 | 69.6 |
Source: Sistema Nacional de Información Ambiental (precipitation and humidity 1994–2009)
