= Tayabamba District =

Coordinates: 8°16′36″S 77°17′47″W

Tayabamba Tayapampa
- District
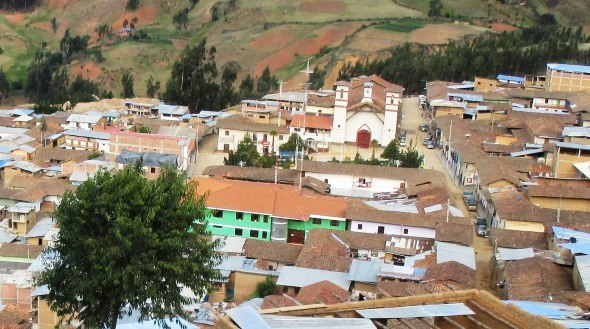
- Interactive map of Tayabamba
- Country: Peru
- Region: La Libertad
- Province: Pataz
- Capital: Tayabamba

Government
  - Mayor: Orleer Medina Barrios

Area
  - Total: 339.13 km^{2} (130.94 sq mi)
- Elevation: 3,203 m (10,509 ft)

Population (2005 census)
  - Total: 12,645
  - Density: 37.287/km^{2} (96.572/sq mi)
- Time zone: UTC-5 (PET)
- UBIGEO: 130801

Tayabamba or Tayapampa (Quechua taya a kind of plant, pampa a large plain) is one of thirteen districts of the province Pataz in Peru.
