= Charat District =

Charat
- District
- Interactive map of Charat
- Country: Peru
- Region: La Libertad
- Province: Otuzco
- Founded: May 14, 1876
- Capital: Charat

Government
  - Mayor: Edmundo Salvador Medina Rodriguez

Area
  - Total: 68.89 km^{2} (26.60 sq mi)
- Elevation: 2,268 m (7,441 ft)

Population (2005 census)
  - Total: 3,223
  - Density: 46.78/km^{2} (121.2/sq mi)
- Time zone: UTC-5 (PET)
- UBIGEO: 130604

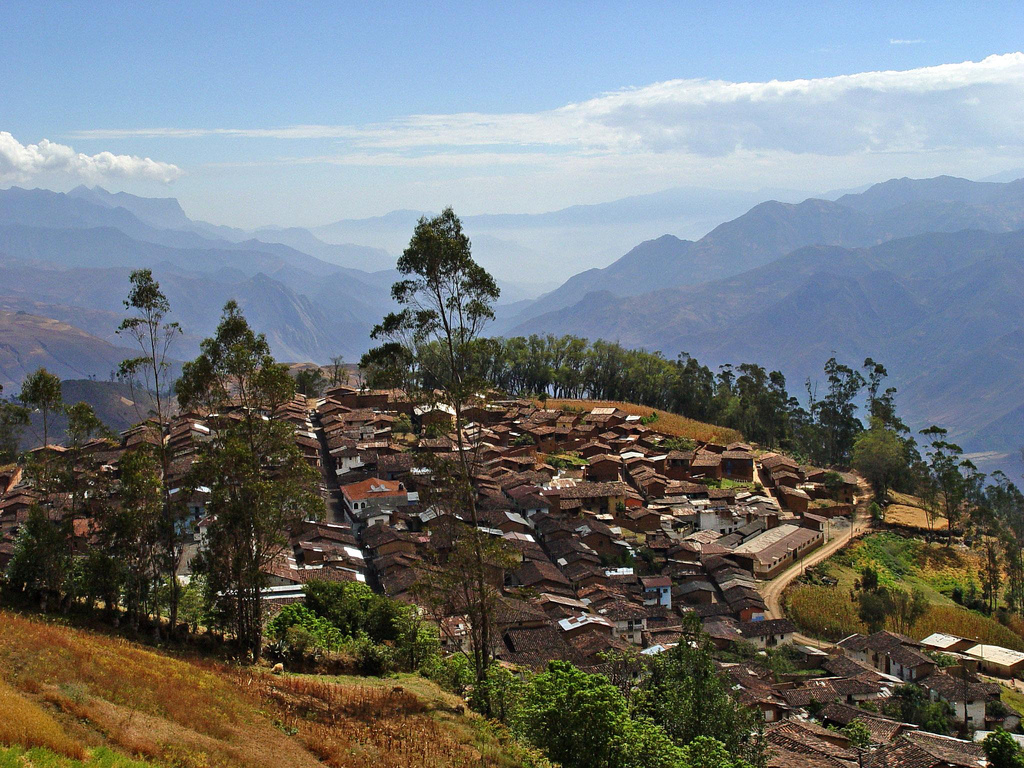

Charat District is one of ten districts of the province Otuzco in Peru.

== Climate ==
Climate data for Callancas, Charat, elevation 1,501 m (4,925 ft), (1991–2020)
Month	Jan	Feb	Mar	Apr	May	Jun	Jul	Aug	Sep	Oct	Nov	Dec	Year
Mean daily maximum °C (°F)	26.4 (79.5)	26.1 (79.0)	25.9 (78.6)	26.2 (79.2)	27.0 (80.6)	27.5 (81.5)	27.7 (81.9)	27.9 (82.2)	27.9 (82.2)	27.4 (81.3)	27.1 (80.8)	26.8 (80.2)	27.0 (80.6)
Mean daily minimum °C (°F)	16.6 (61.9)	16.8 (62.2)	16.8 (62.2)	16.5 (61.7)	15.9 (60.6)	15.1 (59.2)	15.0 (59.0)	15.3 (59.5)	15.6 (60.1)	15.9 (60.6)	15.6 (60.1)	16.2 (61.2)	15.9 (60.7)
Average precipitation mm (inches)	62.0 (2.44)	102.1 (4.02)	130.6 (5.14)	64.1 (2.52)	23.5 (0.93)	2.9 (0.11)	1.1 (0.04)	0.6 (0.02)	9.1 (0.36)	26.4 (1.04)	24.5 (0.96)	50.3 (1.98)	497.2 (19.56)
Source: National Meteorology and Hydrology Service of Peru
