= Virgin of La Puerta =

Peruvian Marian devotion of the Catholic church

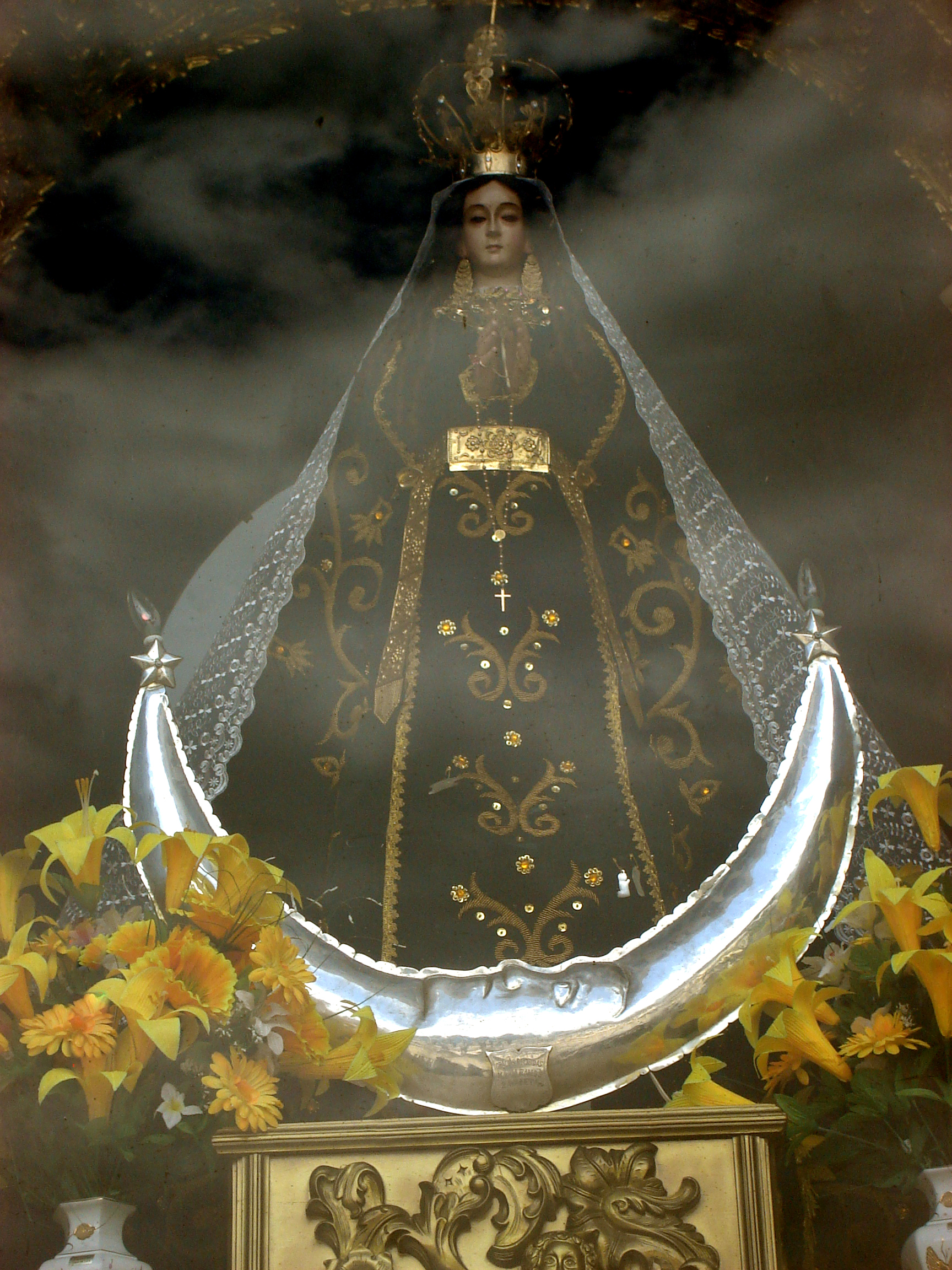
Virgin of La Puerta, Otuzco

Virgin of La Puerta is a Marian devotion of the Catholic Church in Peru whose image has its principal place of worship in a sanctuary built on the site where once stood the gateway to Otuzco, in a high andean area located about 75 km northeast of Trujillo city, in La Libertad region.

== History ==
According to chronicles, worship and faith of the people of Otuzco to "Virgin of La Puerta" began in the seventeenth century when it was feared a piracy attack to the city of Trujillo, so the nearby villages could be also attacked by pirates in a possible incursion of these to the coastal city. In Otuzco existed a chapel dedicated to Immaculate Conception, Patroness of Otuzco in that time. When the news became known that the northern cities Guayaquil and Zaña had been attacked by pirates and believing that Trujillo would be the next city to be attacked, from Trujillo were sent messages to the nearby villages so they could take their preventive measures. Residents of Otuzco placed an image of the Virgin of the Conception in the entrance of the village as a symbol of prayer and protection of piracy attacks. Miraculously Trujillo was not attacked by pirates dangerous, and since then born worship and faith to Virgin of La Puerta which spans the north of Peru.

== Patronal feast ==
The celebration originated in 1664 when it placed the image of the Virgin at the entrance of Otuzco as precaution of the risk of a pirate raid. The main day is celebrated on December 15 every year and in 2012 the feast of Our Lady of the Gate was declared a National Cultural Heritage by the Peruvian government. From days before the central date hundreds of devout pilgrims make a journey of about 73 km from Trujillo to the sanctuary of the Virgen de la Puerta, located in Otuzco.

Pope Francis celebrated Our Lady of the Gate during his apostolic visit to Peru in January 2018.

== See also ==
- Otuzco
- Trujillo
