= Pías District =

Pías
- District
- Interactive map of Pías
- Country: Peru
- Region: La Libertad
- Province: Pataz
- Founded: October 31, 1955
- Capital: Pías

Government
  - Mayor: Sixto Manuel Cueva Lezama

Area
  - Total: 371.67 km^{2} (143.50 sq mi)
- Elevation: 2,630 m (8,630 ft)

Population (2005 census)
  - Total: 1,725
  - Density: 4.641/km^{2} (12.02/sq mi)
- Time zone: UTC-5 (PET)
- UBIGEO: 130810

Pías District is one of thirteen districts of the province Pataz in Peru.
