= Bolívar, Peru =

Coordinates: 7°09′14.2″S 77°42′09.5″W

Bolívar
- Village
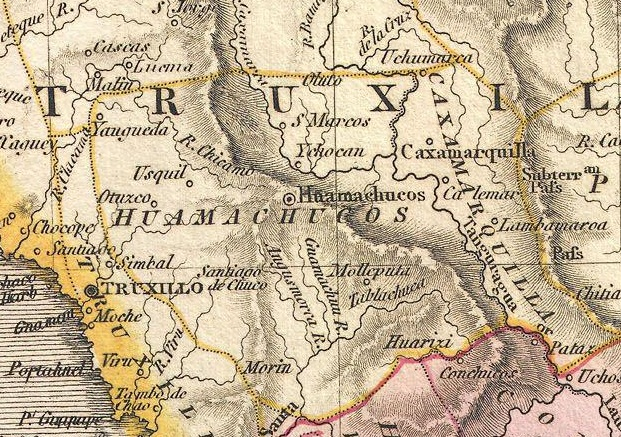
- 1818 Peru map excerpt shows "Caxamarquilla", today Bolívar, in upper right
- Interactive map of Bolívar
- Country: Peru
- Region: La Libertad
- Province: Bolívar
- District: Bolívar

Government
  - Mayor: Aledo Alejandro Echeverria Valle
- Elevation: 3,129 m (10,266 ft)

Bolívar (formerly Cajamarquilla) is a town in the northern Pacific coastal region of Peru. It is the capital city of the Bolívar District and Bolívar Province, which lays within the Department of La Libertad.

The village was originally named Caxamarquilla or Cajamarquilla (not the same location as the archaeological site near Lima of the same name), and was renamed Bolívar in 1940. In pre-independence times, it was the capital of the corregimiento of Cajamarquilla, also called Pataz. It came under the Intendancy of Trujillo when that was created in 1784. Upon independence, it was first included in Pataz province, and it was the capital of the Cajamarquilla district within the province. When Bolívar province (as Cajamarquilla province) was created in 1916, it became part of that province and was named the capital of the new province.

In the 2017 Peruvian census, it had a population of 1,620, the only settlement of any substantial size in the district, which had a population of 4,455, and also the largest town in the province, which had a population of 14,457.

The town's population in 1877 was 1,276.
