= Pirca Pirca, La Libertad =

Archaeological site in Peru

Coordinates: 7.0445°S 77.7600°W

Pirca Pirca
- Location within Peru
- Location: Peru; Bolívar Province, La Libertad
- Region: Andes

Pirca Pirca (possibly from Quechua pirqa wall) is an archaeological site in Peru. It is located in the La Libertad Region, Bolívar Province, Uchumarca District. Pirca Pirca was declared a National Cultural Heritage of Peru by the National Institute of Culture by Resolución Directoral Nacional No. 075-INC on December 30, 1998. The site lies on top of the mountain named Pirca Pirca.
