= Huancaspata District =

Huancaspata Wankapata
- District
- Interactive map of Huancaspata
- Country: Peru
- Region: La Libertad
- Province: Pataz
- Capital: Huancaspata

Government
  - Mayor: Gualberto Carrera Flores

Area
  - Total: 247.48 km^{2} (95.55 sq mi)
- Elevation: 2,900 m (9,500 ft)

Population (2005 census)
  - Total: 6,527
  - Density: 26.37/km^{2} (68.31/sq mi)
- Time zone: UTC-5 (PET)
- UBIGEO: 130804

Huancaspata or Wankapata (Quechua wanka stone pata elevated place / edge, bank (of a river), shore) is one of thirteen districts of the province Pataz in Peru.
