= Agallpampa District =

Agallpampa
- District
- Location within Peru
- Country: Peru
- Region: La Libertad
- Province: Otuzco
- Founded: September 10, 1941
- Capital: Agallpampa

Government
  - Mayor: Victor Aquiles Ponce Zavaleta

Area
  - Total: 258.56 km^{2} (99.83 sq mi)
- Elevation: 3,117 m (10,226 ft)

Population (2005 census)
  - Total: 9,631
  - Density: 37.25/km^{2} (96.47/sq mi)
- Time zone: UTC-5 (PET)
- UBIGEO: 130602

Agallpampa District is one of ten districts of the province Otuzco in Peru.
