= Sayapullo District =

Sayapullo
- District
- Interactive map of Sayapullo
- Country: Peru
- Region: La Libertad
- Province: Gran Chimú
- Founded: February 11, 1855
- Capital: Sayapullo

Government
  - Mayor: Amancio Federico Rodriguez Vigo

Area
  - Total: 238.47 km^{2} (92.07 sq mi)
- Elevation: 2,357 m (7,733 ft)

Population (2005 census)
  - Total: 7,593
  - Density: 31.84/km^{2} (82.47/sq mi)
- Time zone: UTC-5 (PET)
- UBIGEO: 131104

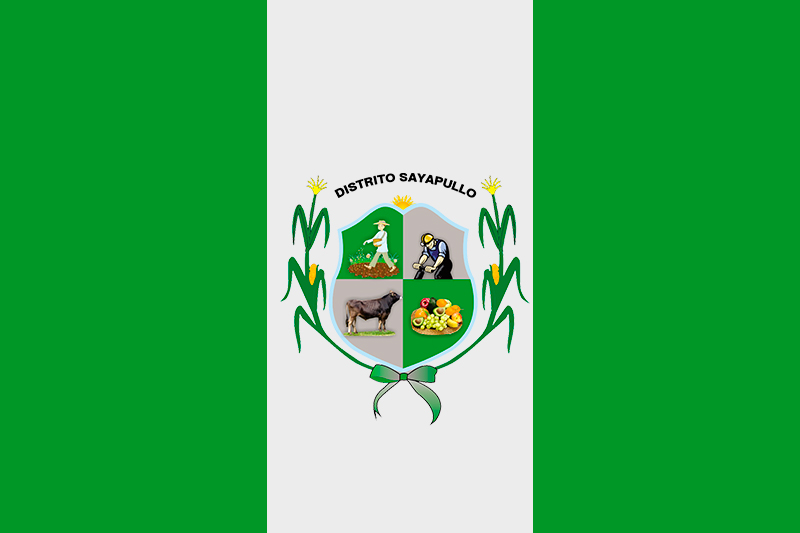
Flag of Sayapullo district

Sayapullo District is one of four districts of the province Gran Chimú located in the Department of La Libertad, part of the region La Libertad, Peru .
