= Charat =

Charat چارات
- Village
- Location within Iran
- Coordinates: 31°02′46″N 49°22′57″E
- Country: Iran
- Province: Khuzestan
- County: Ramshir
- Bakhsh: Moshrageh
- Rural District: Moshrageh

Population (2006)
  - Total: 171
- Time zone: UTC+3:30 (IRST)
  - Summer (DST): UTC+4:30 (IRDT)

Charat (Persian: چارات, also Romanized as Chārāt; also known as Chārāt-e 'Olyā) is a village in Moshrageh Rural District, Moshrageh District, Ramshir County, Khuzestan province, Iran. At the 2006 census, its population was 171, in 33 families.
