= Taurija District =

Taurija
- District
- Interactive map of Taurija
- Country: Peru
- Region: La Libertad
- Province: Pataz
- Founded: October 18, 1941
- Capital: Taurija

Government
  - Mayor: Pedro Ramos Torres

Area
  - Total: 130.09 km^{2} (50.23 sq mi)
- Elevation: 3,111 m (10,207 ft)

Population (2005 census)
  - Total: 2,989
  - Density: 22.98/km^{2} (59.51/sq mi)
- Time zone: UTC-5 (PET)
- UBIGEO: 130812

Taurija District is one of thirteen districts of the province Pataz in Peru.
