= Huaranchal District =

Huaranchal
- District
- Location within Peru
- Country: Peru
- Region: La Libertad
- Province: Otuzco
- Founded: December 17, 1866
- Capital: Huaranchal

Government
  - Mayor: Felix A Segura Garcia

Area
  - Total: 149.65 km^{2} (57.78 sq mi)
- Elevation: 2,180 m (7,150 ft)

Population (2005 census)
  - Total: 5,171
  - Density: 34.55/km^{2} (89.49/sq mi)
- Time zone: UTC-5 (PET)
- UBIGEO: 130605

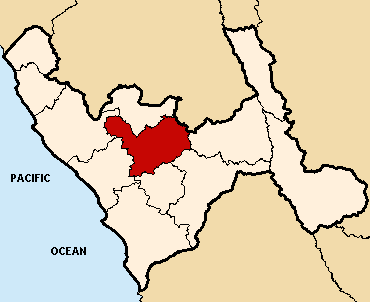
Location of the province Otuzco in the La Libertad region in Peru.

Huaranchal District is one of ten districts of the province Otuzco in Peru.
