= Pacanga District =

Pacanga
- District
- Interactive map of Pacanga
- Country: Peru
- Region: La Libertad
- Province: Chepén
- Founded: December 5, 1940
- Capital: Pacanga

Government
  - Mayor: Santos Apolinar Cerna Quispe

Area
  - Total: 583.93 km^{2} (225.46 sq mi)
- Elevation: 82 m (269 ft)

Population (2005 census)
  - Total: 16,477
  - Density: 28.217/km^{2} (73.083/sq mi)
- Time zone: UTC-5 (PET)
- UBIGEO: 130402

Pacanga District is one of three districts of the province Chepén in Peru.

== Climate ==
Climate data for Cherrepe, Pacanga, elevation 51 m (167 ft), (1991–2020)
| Month | Jan | Feb | Mar | Apr | May | Jun | Jul | Aug | Sep | Oct | Nov | Dec | Year |
|---|---|---|---|---|---|---|---|---|---|---|---|---|---|
| Mean daily maximum °C (°F) | 30.4 (86.7) | 31.4 (88.5) | 31.4 (88.5) | 30.3 (86.5) | 28.2 (82.8) | 26.0 (78.8) | 25.2 (77.4) | 24.8 (76.6) | 25.2 (77.4) | 25.9 (78.6) | 26.6 (79.9) | 28.5 (83.3) | 27.8 (82.1) |
| Mean daily minimum °C (°F) | 19.9 (67.8) | 21.1 (70.0) | 20.7 (69.3) | 19.0 (66.2) | 17.6 (63.7) | 15.9 (60.6) | 14.7 (58.5) | 14.1 (57.4) | 14.8 (58.6) | 15.5 (59.9) | 16.1 (61.0) | 17.9 (64.2) | 17.3 (63.1) |
| Average precipitation mm (inches) | 12.7 (0.50) | 19.6 (0.77) | 18.8 (0.74) | 5.0 (0.20) | 1.6 (0.06) | 0.4 (0.02) | 0.4 (0.02) | 0.0 (0.0) | 0.6 (0.02) | 1.4 (0.06) | 1.1 (0.04) | 2.3 (0.09) | 63.9 (2.52) |
Source: National Meteorology and Hydrology Service of Peru
