= Julcán District, Julcán =

Coordinates: 8°03′S 78°30′W

Julcán
- District
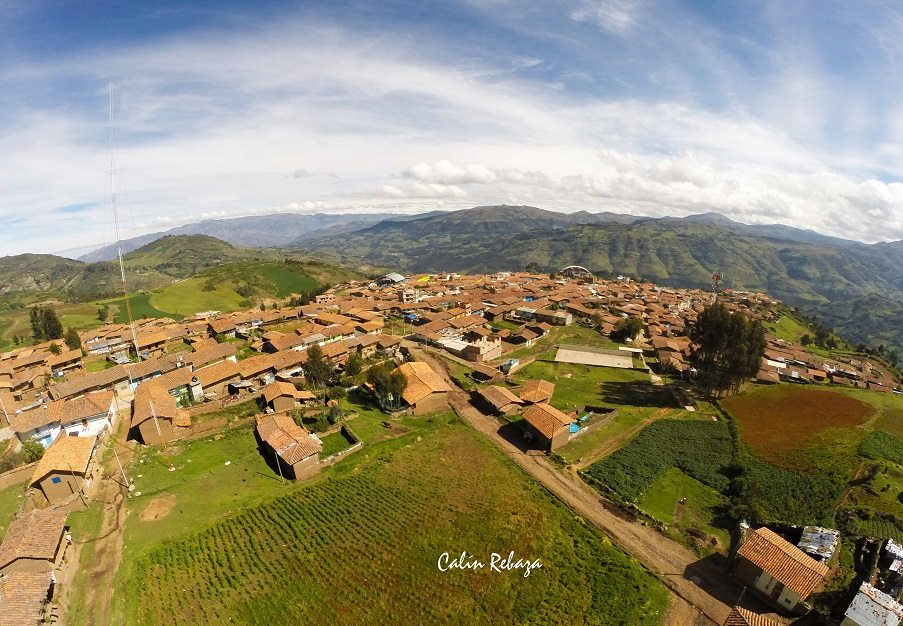
- Julcan, La Libertad, Peru
- Interactive map of Julcán
- Country: Peru
- Region: La Libertad
- Province: Julcán
- Founded: June 12, 1961
- Capital: Julcán

Government
  - Mayor: Diner Wilfredo Valdivieso Velarde

Area
  - Total: 208.49 km^{2} (80.50 sq mi)
- Elevation: 3,404 m (11,168 ft)

Population (2005 census)
  - Total: 15,001
  - Density: 71.951/km^{2} (186.35/sq mi)
- Time zone: UTC-5 (PET)
- UBIGEO: 130501

Julcán District is one of four districts in Julcán Province in Peru.
