= Chillia District =

Chillia
- District
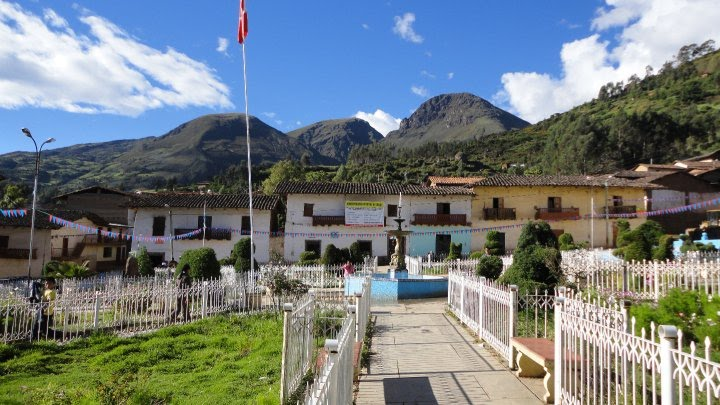
- Interactive map of Chillia
- Country: Peru
- Region: La Libertad
- Province: Pataz
- Capital: Chillia

Government
  - Mayor: Pio Villanueva Gadea

Area
  - Total: 300.04 km^{2} (115.85 sq mi)
- Elevation: 3,118 m (10,230 ft)

Population (2005 census)
  - Total: 10,341
  - Density: 34.465/km^{2} (89.265/sq mi)
- Time zone: UTC-5 (PET)
- UBIGEO: 130803

Chillia District is one of thirteen districts of the province Pataz in Peru.
