= Salpo District =

Salpo.net
- District
- Interactive map of Salpo.net
- Country: Peru
- Region: La Libertad
- Province: Otuzco
- Founded: December 24, 1847
- Capital: Salpo

Government
  - Mayor: Sigifredo Helmer Rojas Guevara

Area
  - Total: 192.74 km^{2} (74.42 sq mi)
- Elevation: 3,439 m (11,283 ft)

Population (2005 census)
  - Total: 6,710
  - Density: 34.8/km^{2} (90.2/sq mi)
- Time zone: UTC-5 (PET)
- UBIGEO: 130611

Salpo District is one of ten districts of the province Otuzco in Peru.

== Climate ==
Climate data for Salpo, elevation 3,418 m (11,214 ft), (1991–2020)
Month	Jan	Feb	Mar	Apr	May	Jun	Jul	Aug	Sep	Oct	Nov	Dec	Year
Mean daily maximum °C (°F)	15.1 (59.2)	14.7 (58.5)	14.7 (58.5)	14.9 (58.8)	15.4 (59.7)	15.8 (60.4)	15.8 (60.4)	16.5 (61.7)	16.1 (61.0)	15.8 (60.4)	15.7 (60.3)	15.4 (59.7)	15.5 (59.9)
Mean daily minimum °C (°F)	5.9 (42.6)	5.8 (42.4)	5.8 (42.4)	5.8 (42.4)	5.7 (42.3)	5.5 (41.9)	5.4 (41.7)	5.7 (42.3)	5.9 (42.6)	6.0 (42.8)	5.9 (42.6)	6.0 (42.8)	5.8 (42.4)
Average precipitation mm (inches)	81.9 (3.22)	118.7 (4.67)	155.9 (6.14)	103.6 (4.08)	29.4 (1.16)	10.3 (0.41)	7.5 (0.30)	6.3 (0.25)	23.6 (0.93)	48.5 (1.91)	42.3 (1.67)	61.2 (2.41)	689.2 (27.15)
Source: National Meteorology and Hydrology Service of Peru
