= Longotea District =

Longotea
- District
- Interactive map of Longotea
- Country: Peru
- Region: La Libertad
- Province: Bolívar
- Founded: November 20, 1916
- Capital: Longotea

Government
  - Mayor: Wilso Araujo Sanchez

Area
  - Total: 192.88 km^{2} (74.47 sq mi)
- Elevation: 2,650 m (8,690 ft)

Population (2017 census)
  - Total: 2,098
  - Density: 10.88/km^{2} (28.17/sq mi)
- Time zone: UTC-5 (PET)
- UBIGEO: 130304

Longotea District is one of six districts of the province of Bolívar in Peru.

It is located in the northwestern corner of the province. The 2017 Peruvian Census reported a population of 2,098 for the district. The capital of the district, Longotea, had a population of 266. The most populated village was San Vicente de Paul with 954 people.

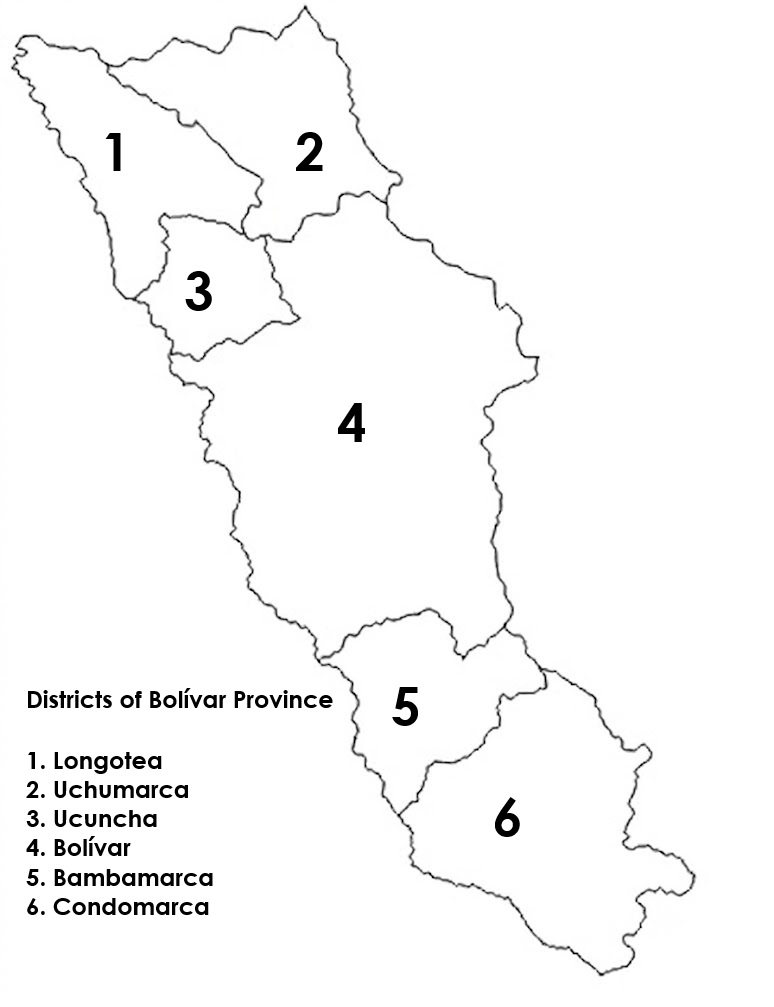
px270
