= Calamarca District =

Calamarca
- District
- Interactive map of Calamarca
- Country: Peru
- Region: La Libertad
- Province: Julcán
- Founded: June 19, 1990
- Capital: Calamarca

Government
  - Mayor: Marco Antonio Rodriguez Espejo

Area
  - Total: 207.57 km^{2} (80.14 sq mi)
- Elevation: 3,200 m (10,500 ft)

Population (2005 census)
  - Total: 6,817
  - Density: 32.84/km^{2} (85.06/sq mi)
- Time zone: UTC-5 (PET)
- UBIGEO: 130502

Calamarca District is one of four districts of the province Julcán in Peru.
