= Lucma District, Gran Chimú =

Lucma
- District
- Interactive map of Lucma
- Country: Peru
- Region: La Libertad
- Province: Gran Chimú
- Capital: Lucma

Government
  - Mayor: Diber Perez Rodriguez

Area
  - Total: 280.38 km^{2} (108.26 sq mi)
- Elevation: 2,182 m (7,159 ft)

Population (2005 census)
  - Total: 5,407
  - Density: 19.28/km^{2} (49.95/sq mi)
- Time zone: UTC-5 (PET)
- UBIGEO: 131102

Lucma District is one of four districts of the province Gran Chimú in Peru.
