= Carabamba District =

Carabamba
- District
- Interactive map of Carabamba
- Country: Peru
- Region: La Libertad
- Province: Julcán
- Founded: June 19, 1990
- Capital: Carabamba

Government
  - Mayor: Luis Ever Trujillo Guevara

Area
  - Total: 254.28 km^{2} (98.18 sq mi)
- Elevation: 3,325 m (10,909 ft)

Population (2005 census)
  - Total: 7,273
  - Density: 28.60/km^{2} (74.08/sq mi)
- Time zone: UTC-5 (PET)
- UBIGEO: 130503

Carabamba District is one of four districts of the province Julcán in Peru.
