= Uchumarca District =

Uchumarca Uchumarka
- District
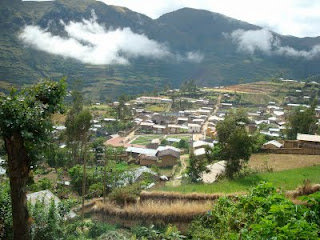
- Interactive map of Uchumarca
- Country: Peru
- Region: La Libertad
- Province: Bolívar
- Founded: January 2, 1857
- Capital: Uchumarca

Government
  - Mayor: Julio Nestor Davila Rojas

Area
  - Total: 190.53 km^{2} (73.56 sq mi)
- Elevation: 3,035 m (9,957 ft)

Population (2005 census)
  - Total: 3,132
  - Density: 16.44/km^{2} (42.58/sq mi)
- Time zone: UTC-5 (PET)
- UBIGEO: 130305

Uchumarca or Uchumarka (Quechua uchu capsicum, marka village) is one of six districts of the province of Bolívar in Peru.

== See also ==
- Pirqa Pirqa
