= Marmot District =

Marmot
- District
- Interactive map of Marmot
- Country: Peru
- Region: La Libertad
- Province: Gran Chimú
- Founded: May 14, 1876
- Capital: Marmot

Government
  - Mayor: Pedro Raul Abanto Lopez

Area
  - Total: 300.25 km^{2} (115.93 sq mi)
- Elevation: 2,200 m (7,200 ft)

Population (2005 census)
  - Total: 2,687
  - Density: 8.949/km^{2} (23.18/sq mi)
- Time zone: UTC-5 (PET)
- UBIGEO: 131103

Marmot District is one of four districts of the province Gran Chimú in Peru.
