= Sanagorán District =

Sanagorán
- District
- Interactive map of Sanagorán
- Country: Peru
- Region: La Libertad
- Province: Sánchez Carrión
- Founded: November 3, 1900
- Capital: Sanagorán

Government
  - Mayor: Santos Melquiadez Ruiz Guerra

Area
  - Total: 324.38 km^{2} (125.24 sq mi)
- Elevation: 2,670 m (8,760 ft)

Population (2005 census)
  - Total: 12,559
  - Density: 38.717/km^{2} (100.28/sq mi)
- Time zone: UTC-5 (PET)
- UBIGEO: 130906

Sanagorán District is one of eight districts of the province Sánchez Carrión in Peru.
