= Bolívar District, Bolívar =

Coordinates: 7°09′14.2″S 77°42′09.5″W

Bolívar District Distrito Bolívar
- District
- Interactive map of Bolívar District
- Country: Peru
- Region: La Libertad
- Province: Bolívar
- Capital: Bolívar

Government
  - Mayor: Aledo Alejandro Echeverria Valle (2007)

Area
  - Total: 740.58 km^{2} (285.94 sq mi)
- Elevation: 3,129 m (10,266 ft)

Population (2017 census)
  - Total: 4,455
  - Density: 6.016/km^{2} (15.58/sq mi)
- Time zone: UTC-5 (PET)
- UBIGEO: 130301

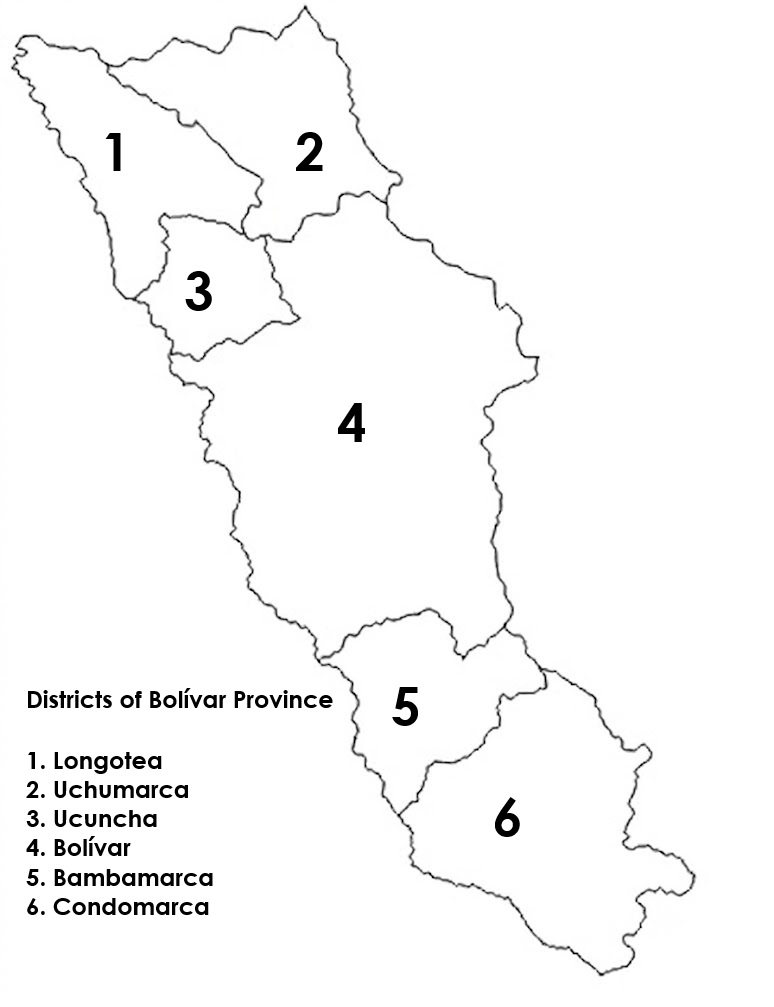
Districts of Bolívar Province

Bolívar District is one of six districts in Bolívar Province in Peru. Its capital is the village of Bolívar.

The district, and its capital city, were renamed from Cajamarquilla to Bolívar in 1940. The district was part of Pataz province until 1916, when it was moved into the new province of Caxamarquilla (Cajamarquilla), which province was renamed Bolívar in 1925 (15 years before the district and city were renamed).

The district had a population of 4,455 in the 2017 Peruvian census.
