= Sartimbamba District =

Sartimbamba
- District
- Interactive map of Sartimbamba
- Coordinates: 7°41′40″S 77°44′34″W
- Country: Peru
- Region: La Libertad
- Province: Sánchez Carrión
- Capital: Sartimbamba

Government
  - Mayor: Hugo Gilberto Juarez Carbajal

Area
  - Total: 394.37 km^{2} (152.27 sq mi)
- Elevation: 2,697 m (8,848 ft)

Population (2005 census)
  - Total: 13,167
  - Density: 33.387/km^{2} (86.473/sq mi)
- Time zone: UTC-5 (PET)
- UBIGEO: 130908

Sartimbamba District is one of eight districts of the province Sánchez Carrión in Peru.
