= Cochorco District =

Cochorco
- District
- Interactive map of Cochorco
- Country: Peru
- Region: La Libertad
- Province: Sánchez Carrión
- Founded: December 13, 1943
- Capital: Aricapampa

Government
  - Mayor: Palermo Contreras Tamayo

Area
  - Total: 258.04 km^{2} (99.63 sq mi)
- Elevation: 2,604 m (8,543 ft)

Population (2005 census)
  - Total: 9,058
  - Density: 35.10/km^{2} (90.92/sq mi)
- Time zone: UTC-5 (PET)
- UBIGEO: 130903

Cochorco District is one of eight districts of the province Sánchez Carrión in Peru.
