= Buldibuyo District =

Buldibuyo
- District
- Interactive map of Buldibuyo
- Country: Peru
- Region: La Libertad
- Province: Pataz
- Capital: Buldibuyo

Government
  - Mayor: Benicio Zevallos Rodriguez

Area
  - Total: 227.39 km^{2} (87.80 sq mi)
- Elevation: 3,162 m (10,374 ft)

Population (2005 census)
  - Total: 4,094
  - Density: 18.00/km^{2} (46.63/sq mi)
- Time zone: UTC-5 (PET)
- UBIGEO: 130802

Buldibuyo District is one of thirteen districts of Pataz Province in Peru.
