= BurroCross =

Backcountry foot travel with a burro

BurroCross is a non-competitive recreational activity wherein one travels on foot (hiking or backpacking) in the company of a burro (Equus africanus asinus). BurroCross proceeds at a walking pace and is centered on utilizing the overland capabilities of burros for companionship and sharing the burden of carrying the gear necessary to sustain the journey.

== Burros ==
BurroCross must be carried out with a burro (donkey). If any other animal is used (including a horse or mule), it is not BurroCross. The burro may be of any size (mini, standard, or mammoth) but generally the standard size is preferred due to its ability to carry the necessary weight as well as its comparatively low maintenance needs on the trail. Burros can be of domestic or formerly wild origin (referred to as BLM burros in the United States).

== Gear ==
The person will normally carry their own personal items in a backpack (clothing, electronics, etc.) and the burro will normally carry the general camp items (tent, sleeping bag, food, etc.), extra water, and its own provisions and gear. A key component of BurroCross is the burro as a companion rather than as a worker, therefore the gear selection and how it is shared between the person and the burro is a key consideration.

== Key Figures ==
Several key figures influenced the development of BurroCross as a sport and recreational activity:

1. Graham Mackintosh. In the winter of 1997-98 Mackintosh made his way 1,000 miles along The Trail of the Padres from Tecate to Loreto, Mexico with his endearing burro Misión. The journey is chronicled in his book, Journey with a Baja Burro.
2. Dave Daney. Daney has hiked and backpacked with burros for over 25 years throughout Colorado and surrounding states. Daney wrote his book, Packing with Burros for the express purpose of promoting the use of burros to make wild places more accessible.
3. Michael Younghusband. In 2010, Younghusband walked for six months over 1,500 miles with his burro, Don-Kay and a tag-along dog, Solo from Tecate to Cabo San Lucas, Mexico.
4. Wylde Williams. Williams coined the term BurroCross and continues working to develop and to promote the sport (BurroCross described on Horses in the Morning).
