= Pataz District =

Coordinates: 7.7861°S 77.5939°W

Pataz
- District
- Interactive map of Pataz
- Country: Peru
- Region: La Libertad
- Province: Pataz
- Capital: Pataz

Government
  - Mayor: Juan Carlos La Rosa Toro Gomez

Area
  - Total: 467.44 km^{2} (180.48 sq mi)
- Elevation: 2,780 m (9,120 ft)

Population (2005 census)
  - Total: 4,364
  - Density: 9.336/km^{2} (24.18/sq mi)
- Time zone: UTC-5 (PET)
- UBIGEO: 130809

Pataz District is one of thirteen districts of the province Pataz in Peru.
