= Santiago de Challas District =

Santiago de Challas
- District
- Interactive map of Santiago de Challas
- Country: Peru
- Region: La Libertad
- Province: Pataz
- Founded: June 18, 1987
- Capital: Challas

Government
  - Mayor: Fabian Cruzado Luna

Area
  - Total: 129.44 km^{2} (49.98 sq mi)
- Elevation: 3,300 m (10,800 ft)

Population (2005 census)
  - Total: 2,925
  - Density: 22.60/km^{2} (58.53/sq mi)
- Time zone: UTC-5 (PET)
- UBIGEO: 130811

Santiago de Challas District is one of thirteen districts of the province Pataz in Peru.
