= Ucuncha District =

Ucuncha
- District
- Interactive map of Ucuncha
- Country: Peru
- Region: La Libertad
- Province: Bolívar
- Founded: November 20, 1916
- Capital: Ucuncha

Government
  - Mayor: Selso Leodan Machuca Santillan

Area
  - Total: 98.41 km^{2} (38.00 sq mi)
- Elevation: 2,625 m (8,612 ft)

Population (2005 census)
  - Total: 1,059
  - Density: 10.76/km^{2} (27.87/sq mi)
- Time zone: UTC-5 (PET)
- UBIGEO: 130306

Ucuncha District is one of six districts of Bolívar Province, Peru.
