= Ongón District =

Ongón
- District
- Interactive map of Ongón
- Coordinates: 8°13′S 77°06′W
- Country: Peru
- Region: La Libertad
- Province: Pataz
- Founded: November 25, 1876
- Capital: Ongón

Government
  - Mayor: Santos Lopez Miranda

Area
  - Total: 1,394.89 km^{2} (538.57 sq mi)
- Elevation: 1,100 m (3,600 ft)

Population (2005 census)
  - Total: 1,574
  - Density: 1.128/km^{2} (2.923/sq mi)
- Time zone: UTC-5 (PET)
- UBIGEO: 130807

Ongón District is one of thirteen districts of the province Pataz in Peru.
