= Huaylillas District =

Huaylillas
- District
- Interactive map of Huaylillas
- Country: Peru
- Region: La Libertad
- Province: Pataz
- Capital: Huaylillas

Government
  - Mayor: Edwar Dante Robles Acuña

Area
  - Total: 89.73 km^{2} (34.64 sq mi)
- Elevation: 2,500 m (8,200 ft)

Population (2005 census)
  - Total: 1,303
  - Density: 14.52/km^{2} (37.61/sq mi)
- Time zone: UTC-5 (PET)
- UBIGEO: 130805

Huaylillas District is one of thirteen districts of the province Pataz in Peru.
