= Sinsicap District =

Sinsicap
- District
- Interactive map of Sinsicap
- Country: Peru
- Region: La Libertad
- Province: Otuzco
- Capital: Sinsicap

Government
  - Mayor: Santos Abercio Reyes Pascual

Area
  - Total: 452.95 km^{2} (174.88 sq mi)
- Elevation: 2,284 m (7,493 ft)

Population (2005 census)
  - Total: 8,308
  - Density: 18.34/km^{2} (47.51/sq mi)
- Time zone: UTC-5 (PET)
- UBIGEO: 130613

Sinsicap District is one of ten districts of the province Otuzco in Peru.
