= Paranday District =

Paranday
- District
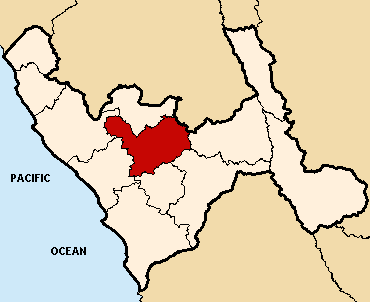
- Interactive map of Paranday
- Country: Peru
- Region: La Libertad
- Province: Otuzco
- Founded: April 28, 1959
- Capital: Paranday

Government
  - Mayor: Juan Carlos Vilca Taboada

Area
  - Total: 21.46 km^{2} (8.29 sq mi)
- Elevation: 3,141 m (10,305 ft)

Population (2005 census)
  - Total: 635
  - Density: 29.6/km^{2} (76.6/sq mi)
- Time zone: UTC-5 (PET)
- UBIGEO: 130610

Paranday District is one of ten districts of the province Otuzco in Peru.
