= Huaso District =

Huaso Wasu
- District
- Interactive map of Huaso
- Country: Peru
- Region: La Libertad
- Province: Julcán
- Founded: June 19, 1990
- Capital: Huaso

Government
  - Mayor: Mercedes Ladimir Castro Arteaga

Area
  - Total: 431.05 km^{2} (166.43 sq mi)
- Elevation: 3,050 m (10,010 ft)

Population (2005 census)
  - Total: 6,347
  - Density: 14.72/km^{2} (38.14/sq mi)
- Time zone: UTC-5 (PET)
- UBIGEO: 130504

Huaso or Wasu (Quechua) is one of four districts of the province Julcán in Peru.
