= Julcán province =

Coordinates: 8°03′S 78°30′W

Julcán
- Province
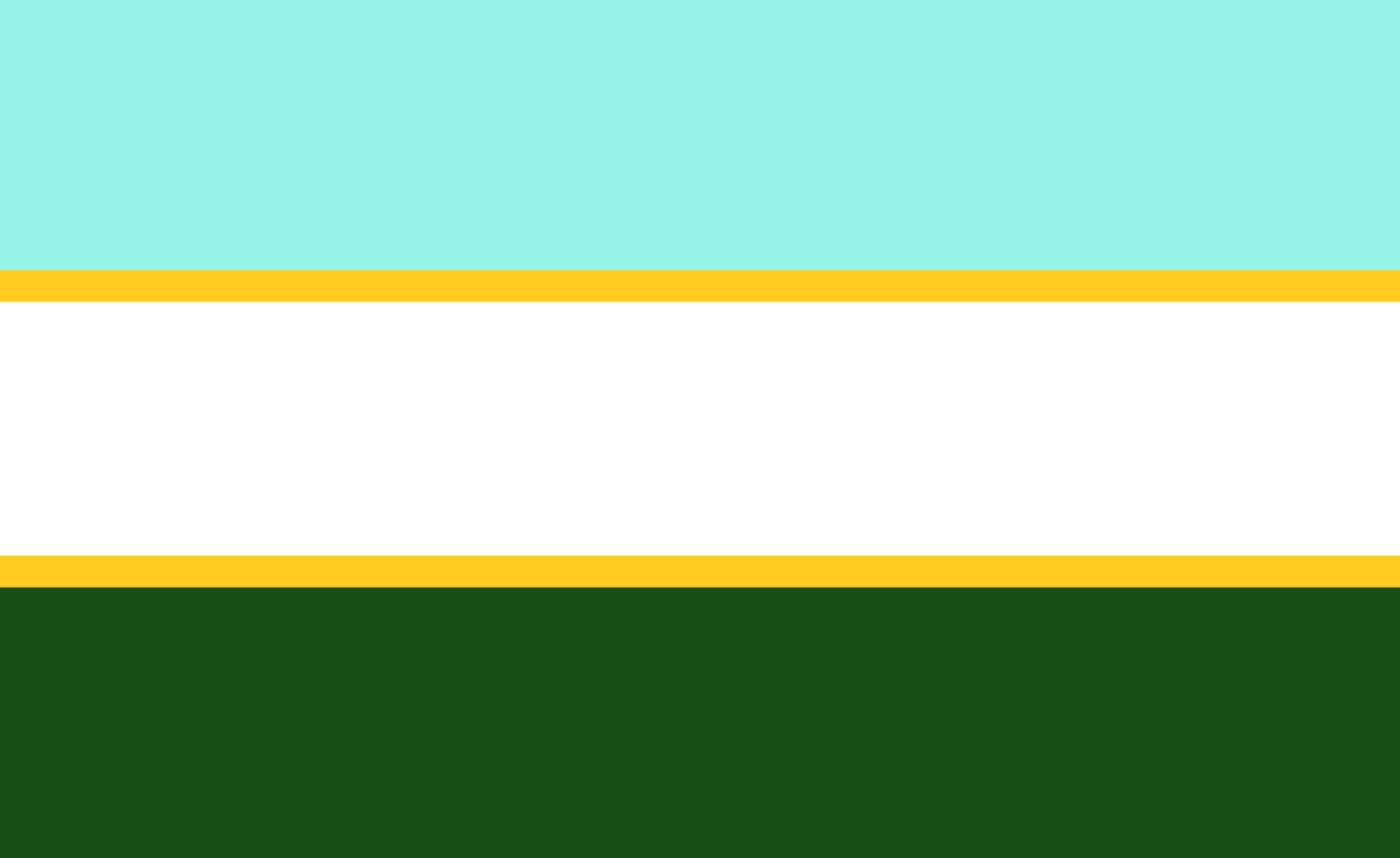
- Flag Coat of arms

- Location of Julcán in La Libertad Region
- Country: Peru
- Region: La Libertad
- Capital: Julcán

Government
  - Mayor: Diner Wilfredo Valdivieso Velarde (2007)

Area
  - Total: 1,101.39 km^{2} (425.25 sq mi)
- Elevation: 3,404 m (11,168 ft)

Population
  - Total: 35,438
  - Density: 32.176/km^{2} (83.335/sq mi)
- UBIGEO: 1305

Julcán is one of twelve provinces of the La Libertad Region in Peru. The capital of this province is the city of Julcán.

== Political division ==
The province is divided into four districts, which are:

- Julcán
- Calamarca
- Carabamba
- Huaso

== See also ==
- La Libertad Region
- Peru
