= Gran Chimú province =

Coordinates: 7°28′48″S 78°49′12″W

Gran Chímu
- Province
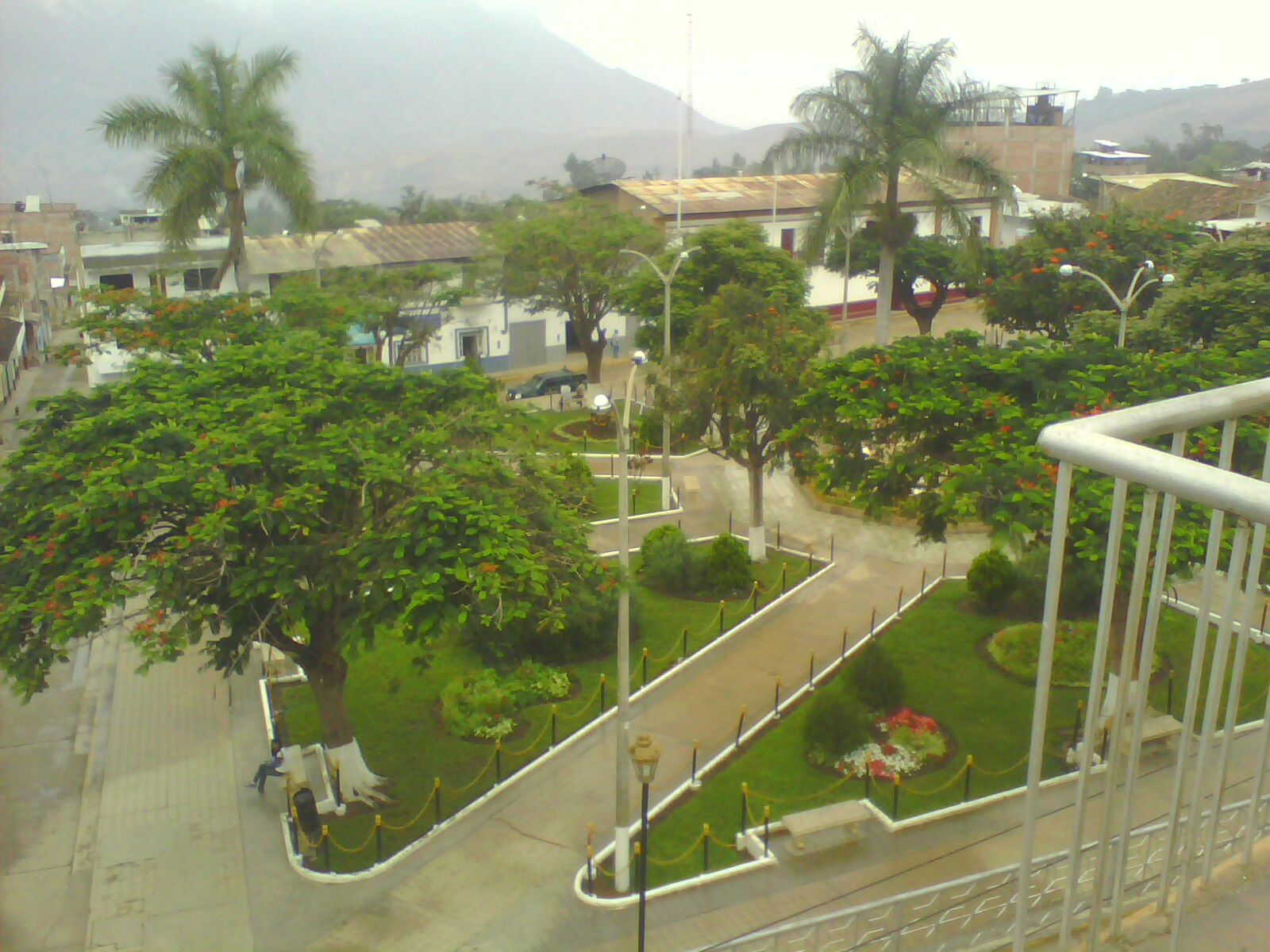

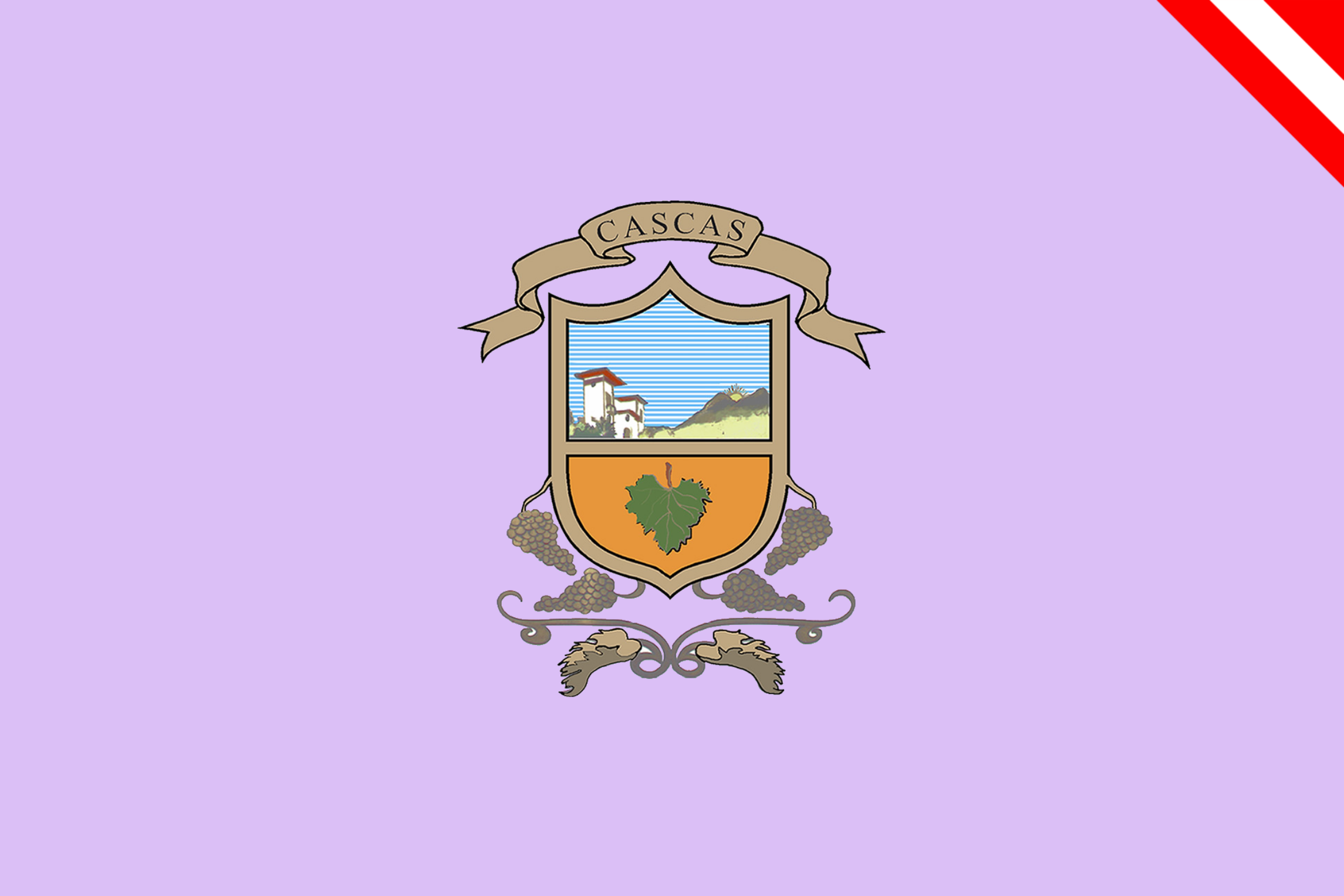
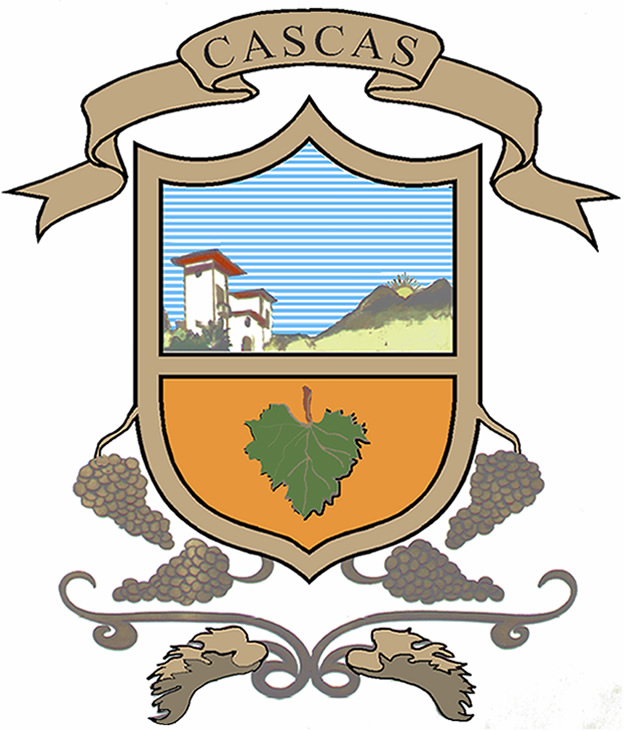
- Flag Coat of arms

- Location of Gran Chímu in La Libertad Region
- Country: Peru
- Region: La Libertad
- Capital: Cascas

Government
  - Mayor: Joel David Diaz Velasquez (2007)

Area
  - Total: 1,284.77 km^{2} (496.05 sq mi)

Population (2005 census)
  - Total: 30,526
  - Density: 23.760/km^{2} (61.538/sq mi)
- UBIGEO: 1311

The Gran Chímu Province is one of twelve provinces of the Department of La Libertad in Peru. The capital of this province is the city of Cascas. It was created on 6 December 1994; previously, it belonged to the Department of Cajamarca.

== Political division ==
The province is divided into four districts, which are:

- Cascas
- Marmot
- Lucma
- Sayapullo
