= Pías =

Coordinates: 42°05′00″N 7°00′00″W

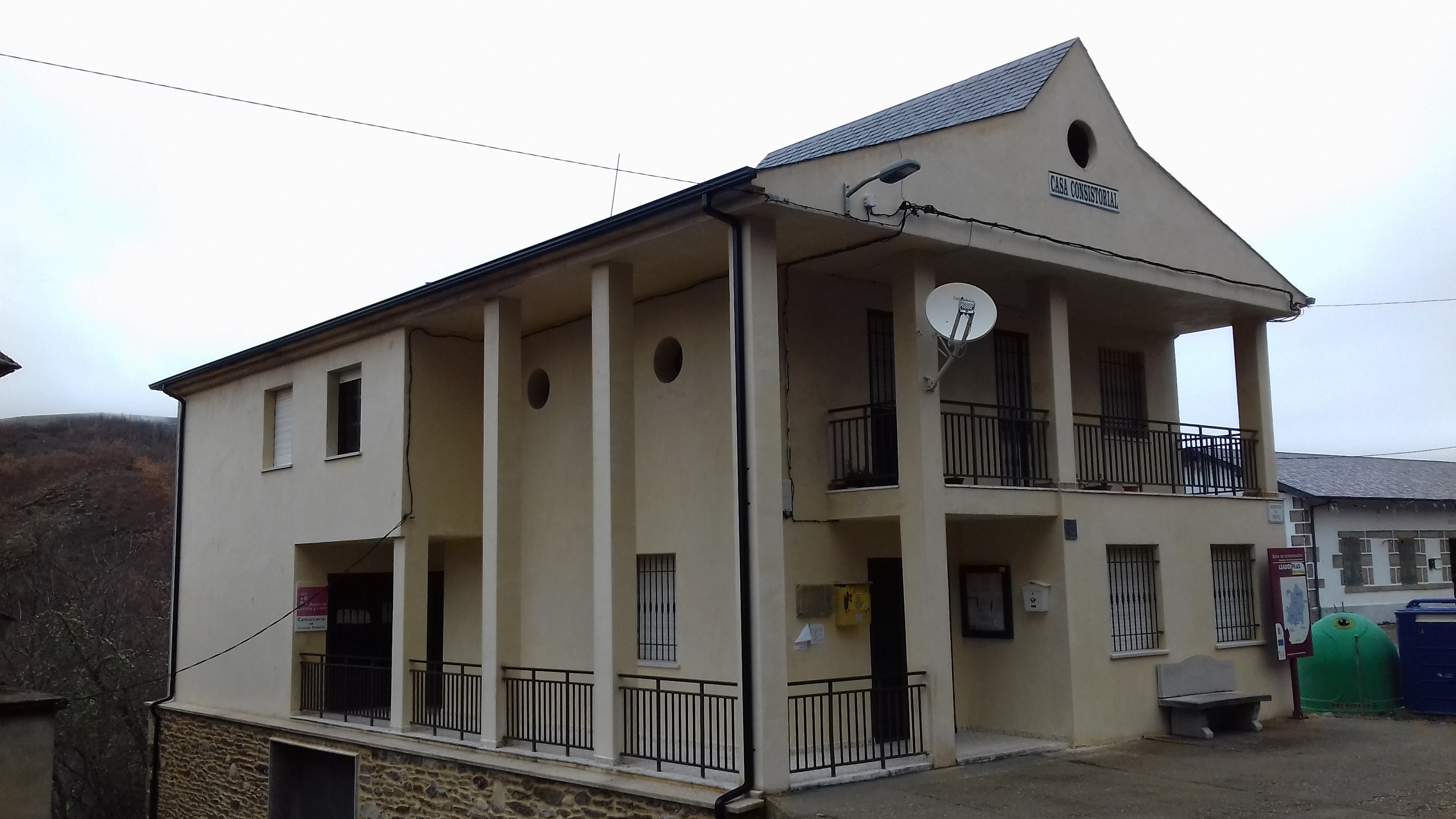
- Interactive map of Pías
- Country: Spain
- Autonomous community: Castile and León
- Province: Zamora
- Municipality: Pías

Area
  - Total: 43 km^{2} (17 sq mi)

Population (2025-01-01)
  - Total: 91
  - Density: 2.1/km^{2} (5.5/sq mi)
- Time zone: UTC+1 (CET)
  - Summer (DST): UTC+2 (CEST)

Pías is a municipality located in the province of Zamora, Castile and León, Spain. According to the 2004 census (INE), the municipality has a population of 201 inhabitants.
