= Parcoy District =

Coordinates: 8°2′14″S 77°28′40″W

Parcoy Parquy
- District
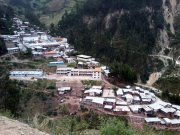
- Parcoy
- Interactive map of Parcoy
- Country: Peru
- Region: La Libertad
- Province: Pataz
- Capital: Parcoy

Government
  - Mayor: Santos Panfilo Quispe Alvarado

Area
  - Total: 304.99 km^{2} (117.76 sq mi)
- Elevation: 3,126 m (10,256 ft)

Population (2005 census)
  - Total: 11,920
  - Density: 39.08/km^{2} (101.2/sq mi)
- Time zone: UTC-5 (PET)
- UBIGEO: 130808

Parcoy or Parquy (Quechua) is one of thirteen districts of the province Pataz in Peru.
