= Mache District =

Coordinates: 8°01′50″S 78°32′05″W

Mache
- District
- Interactive map of Mache
- Country: Peru
- Region: La Libertad
- Province: Otuzco
- Founded: March 7, 1964
- Capital: Mache

Government
  - Mayor: Glomer Pascual Rubio Valderrama

Area
  - Total: 37.32 km^{2} (14.41 sq mi)
- Elevation: 3,300 m (10,800 ft)

Population (2005 census)
  - Total: 3,465
  - Density: 92.85/km^{2} (240.5/sq mi)
- Time zone: UTC-5 (PET)
- UBIGEO: 130608

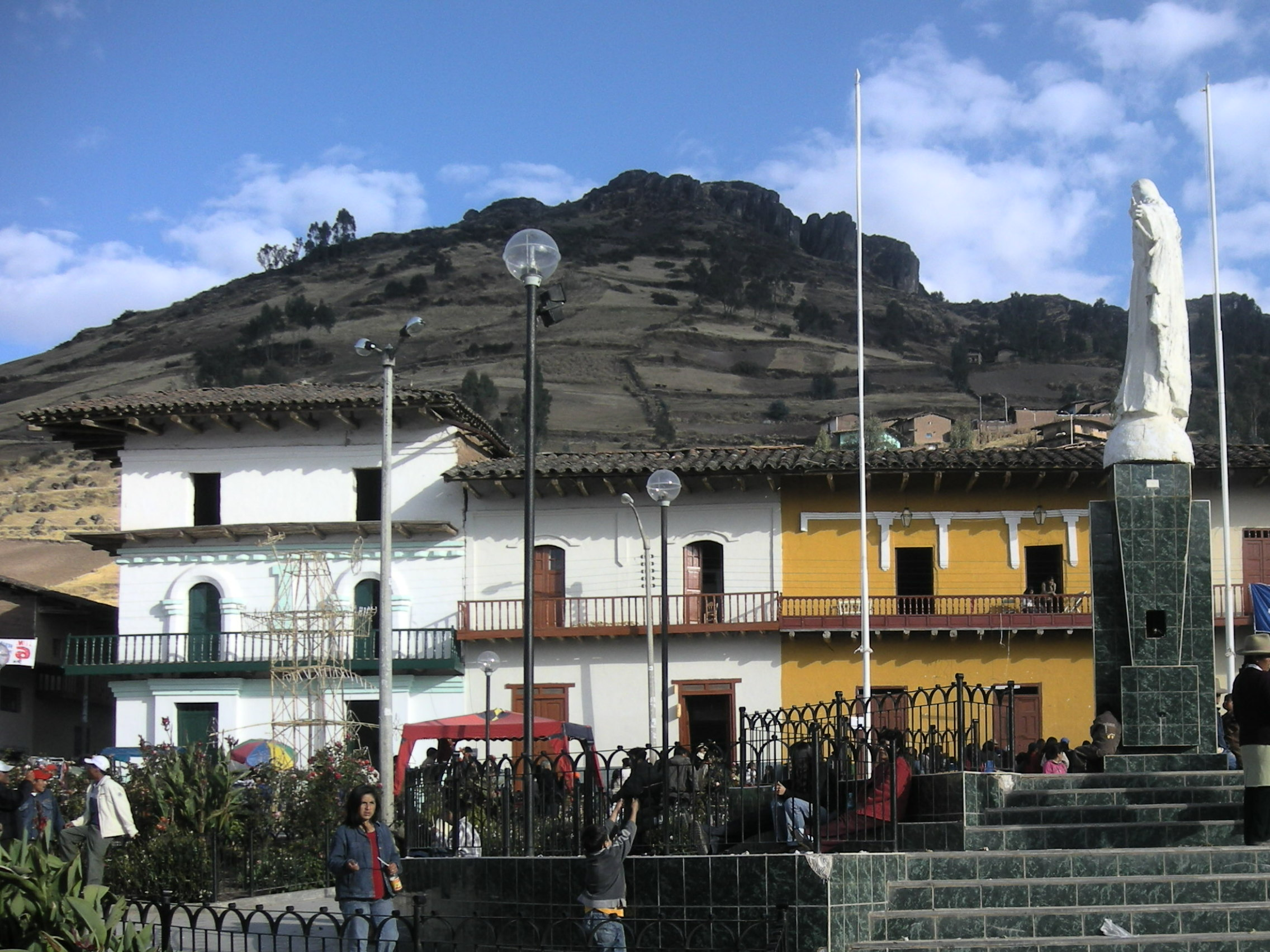

Mache District is one of ten districts of the province Otuzco in Peru.
