= Chugay District =

Chugay
- District
- Interactive map of Chugay
- Country: Peru
- Region: La Libertad
- Province: Sánchez Carrión
- Founded: December 13, 1943
- Capital: Chugay

Government
  - Mayor: Ronald Hernando Campos Pinedo

Area
  - Total: 416.31 km^{2} (160.74 sq mi)
- Elevation: 3,371 m (11,060 ft)

Population (2005 census)
  - Total: 18,296
  - Density: 43.948/km^{2} (113.82/sq mi)
- Time zone: UTC-5 (PET)
- UBIGEO: 130902

Chugay District is one of eight districts of the province Sánchez Carrión in Peru.
