= Otuzco province =

Coordinates: 7.904574°S 78.563619°W

Otuzco
- Province
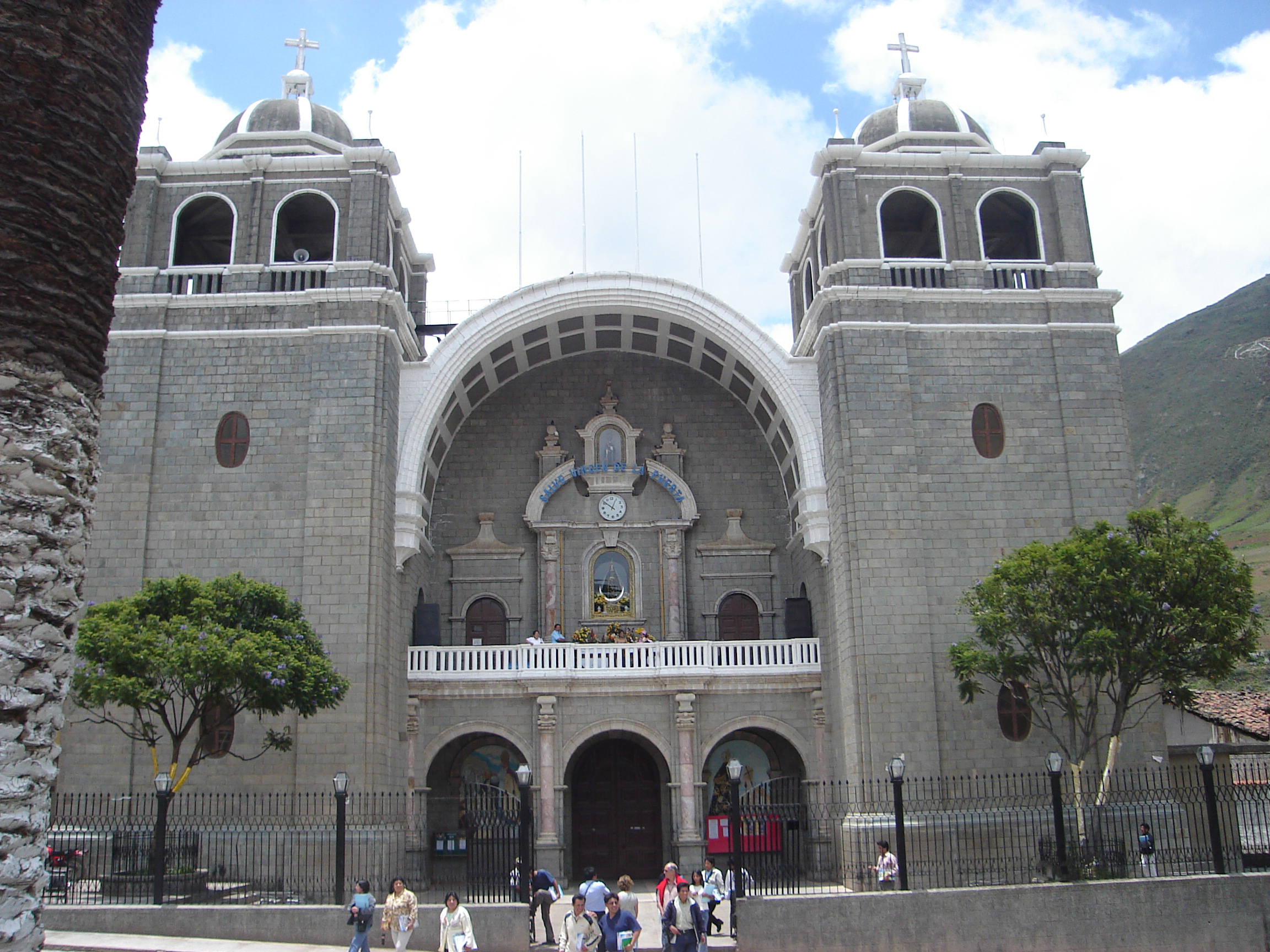

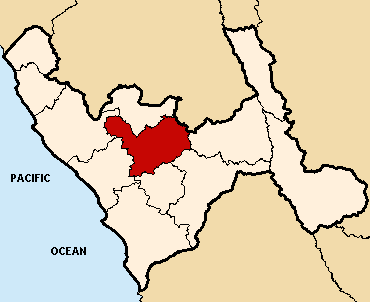
- Location of Otuzco in La Libertad Region
- Country: Peru
- Region: La Libertad
- Capital: Otuzco

Government
  - Mayor: Diomedes Alcibiades Veneros Ortecho (2007)

Area
  - Total: 2,110.77 km^{2} (814.97 sq mi)

Population (2005 census)
  - Total: 89,056
  - Density: 42.191/km^{2} (109.27/sq mi)
- UBIGEO: 1306

Otuzco is one of twelve provinces of the La Libertad Region in Peru. The capital of this province is the city of Otuzco.

== Political division ==
The province is divided into ten districts, which are:

- Otuzco
- Agallpampa
- Charat
- Huaranchal
- La Cuesta
- Mache
- Paranday
- Salpo
- Sinsicap
- Usquil
