= Sarín District =

Sarín
- District
- Interactive map of Sarín
- Country: Peru
- Region: La Libertad
- Province: Sánchez Carrión
- Founded: November 3, 1900
- Capital: Sarín

Government
  - Mayor: Leoncio Serin Chacon

Area
  - Total: 340.08 km^{2} (131.31 sq mi)
- Elevation: 2,792 m (9,160 ft)

Population (2005 census)
  - Total: 9,009
  - Density: 26.49/km^{2} (68.61/sq mi)
- Time zone: UTC-5 (PET)
- UBIGEO: 130907

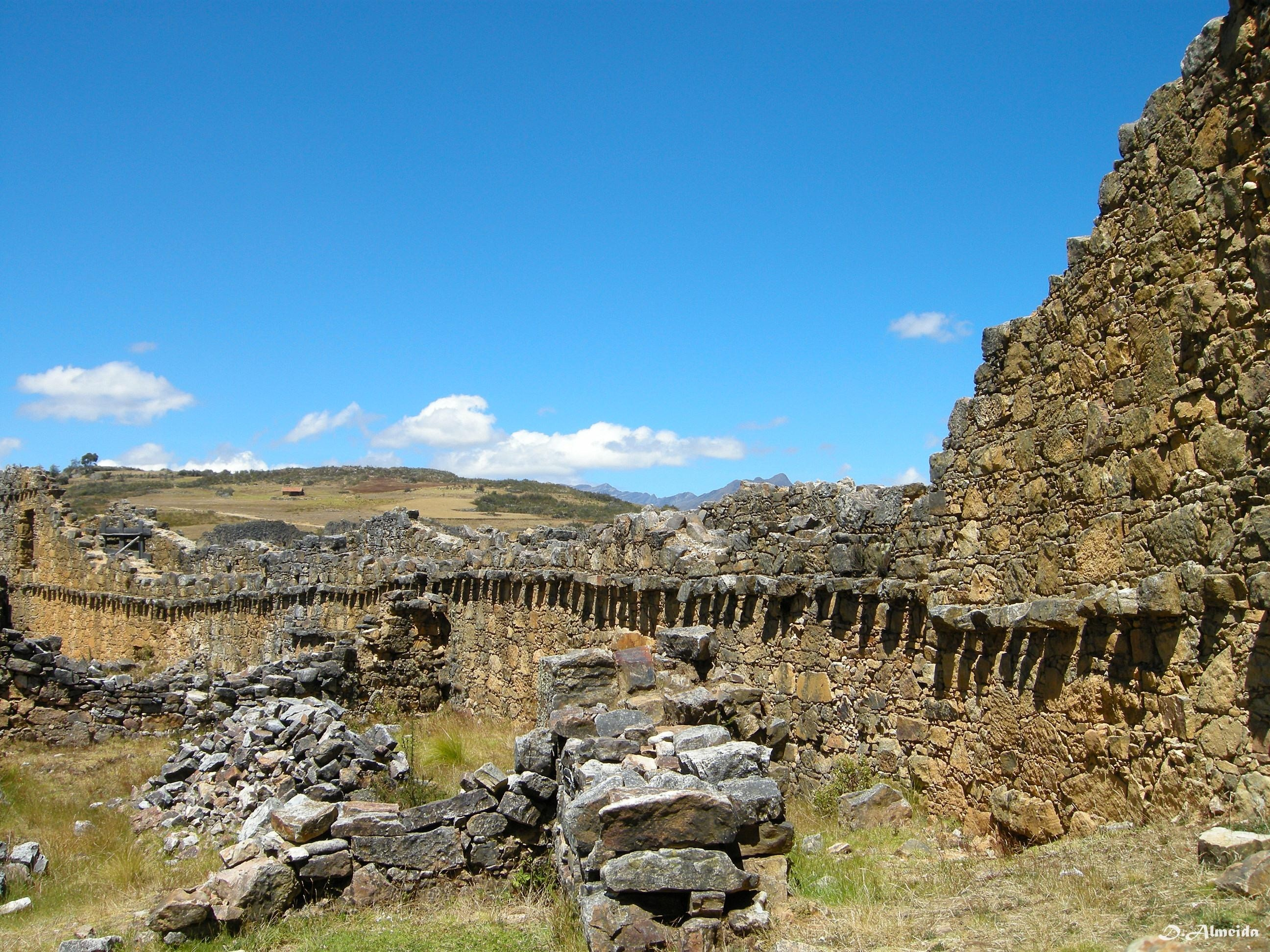
Marcahuamachuco: Circular Gallery of Las Monjas

Sarín District is one of eight districts of the province Sánchez Carrión in Peru.
