= Urpay District =

Urpay
- District
- Interactive map of Urpay
- Country: Peru
- Region: La Libertad
- Province: Pataz
- Founded: February 10, 1959
- Capital: Urpay

Government
  - Mayor: Cesar Cruzado Navarro

Area
  - Total: 99.61 km^{2} (38.46 sq mi)
- Elevation: 2,688 m (8,819 ft)

Population (2005 census)
  - Total: 3,125
  - Density: 31.37/km^{2} (81.25/sq mi)
- Time zone: UTC-5 (PET)
- UBIGEO: 130813

Urpay District is one of thirteen districts of the province Pataz in Peru. It is one of the few remaining pockets where Indigenous languages are spoken in the department of La Libertad.
