= Cascas =

- Town
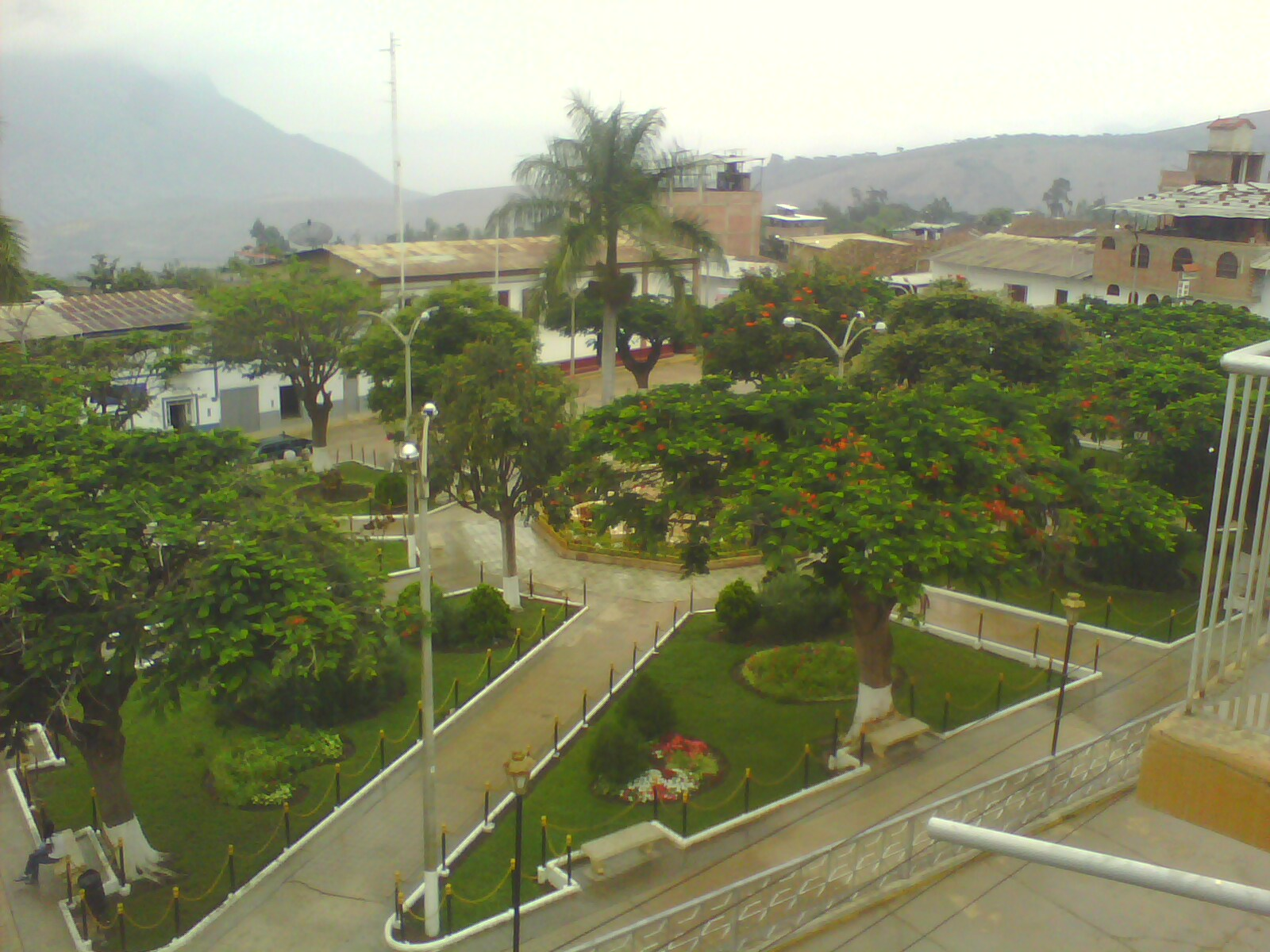
- Plaza de Armas of Cascas in January

- Location within Peru
- Coordinates: 7°28′47″S 78°49′4″W
- Country: Peru
- Region: La Libertad
- Province: Gran Chimú
- District: Cascas

Government
  - Mayor: Juan Julio Iglesias Gutiérrez
- Elevation: 1,255 m (4,117 ft)
- Time zone: UTC−05:00 (PET)

Cascas is a town in Northern Peru, capital of Gran Chimú Province in La Libertad Region.

Cascas is a small town of 5000 people located in the mountains of the state of La Libertad, Peru. Located 2 hours from the capital city of Trujillo. The primary industry and source of revenue of Cascas is the growing of grapes and the subsequent production of wine.

== History ==
The earliest evidence of occupation in the area date back to the formative period of Cascas (petroglyphs, cave paintings). It has also been found in various parts of the province, ceramic of the Cupisnique, Mochica, Chimu, Caxamarca culture, and some evidence to demonstrate that Cascas hosted a peaceful and progressive regional lordship. Caxcax (As settlement of Indians) existed since ancient times, which are lost in time. Later, with the arrival of the Spanish, they founded the San Gabriel Caxcax people, as evidenced by official documents from the colonial era. However, the fate assigned to Cascas, prominent place in history. Its geographic location has served as a transit between the peoples of the northern highlands and the coast.

== Gastronomy ==
=== Northern pisco sour ===
In Peru the abundant production of pisco in Cascas allowed to offer a Pisco Sour norteño.

=== Casquino wine ===
Since 1975 there is a saying that says "if it came to Cascas and took no wine, then why did he come". Grape is produced throughout the year. Wines of all types from malbec to special sacramental wine.

== People from Cascas ==
Luis A. Diaz, M.D. - Professor of Dermatology at the University of North Carolina

== Climate ==
Climate data for Cascas, elevation 1,700 m (5,600 ft), (1995–2009)
Month	Jan	Feb	Mar	Apr	May	Jun	Jul	Aug	Sep	Oct	Nov	Dec	Year
Mean daily maximum °C (°F)	27.3 (81.1)	26.8 (80.2)	27.0 (80.6)	27.1 (80.8)	27.2 (81.0)	26.3 (79.3)	26.5 (79.7)	27.2 (81.0)	27.5 (81.5)	27.7 (81.9)	27.5 (81.5)	26.9 (80.4)	27.1 (80.8)
Mean daily minimum °C (°F)	16.4 (61.5)	17.4 (63.3)	17.4 (63.3)	16.6 (61.9)	15.3 (59.5)	14.0 (57.2)	13.5 (56.3)	13.8 (56.8)	14.5 (58.1)	15.4 (59.7)	15.5 (59.9)	15.9 (60.6)	15.5 (59.8)
Average precipitation mm (inches)	21.2 (0.83)	40.4 (1.59)	46.7 (1.84)	9.8 (0.39)	1.2 (0.05)	0.4 (0.02)	0.1 (0.00)	0.1 (0.00)	0.7 (0.03)	3.1 (0.12)	6.8 (0.27)	15.7 (0.62)	146.2 (5.76)
Source: Sistema Nacional de Información Ambiental

== See also ==
- La Libertad Region
- Gran Chimú Province
- Trujillo, Peru
