= Huayo District =

Huayo Wayu
- District
- Interactive map of Huayo
- Country: Peru
- Region: La Libertad
- Province: Pataz
- Capital: Huayo

Government
  - Mayor: Omar Armando Iparraguirre Espinoza

Area
  - Total: 124.63 km^{2} (48.12 sq mi)
- Elevation: 2,200 m (7,200 ft)

Population (2005 census)
  - Total: 3,027
  - Density: 24.29/km^{2} (62.91/sq mi)
- Time zone: UTC-5 (PET)
- UBIGEO: 130806

Huayo or Wayu (Quechua for fruit) is one of thirteen districts of the province Pataz in Peru.
