= Marcabal District =

Marcabal
- District
- Interactive map of Marcabal
- Country: Peru
- Region: La Libertad
- Province: Sánchez Carrión
- Capital: Marcabal

Government
  - Mayor: Walter Braulio Armas Monzon

Area
  - Total: 229.57 km^{2} (88.64 sq mi)
- Elevation: 2,930 m (9,610 ft)

Population (2005 census)
  - Total: 12,459
  - Density: 54.271/km^{2} (140.56/sq mi)
- Time zone: UTC-5 (PET)
- UBIGEO: 130905

Marcabal District is one of eight districts of the province Sánchez Carrión in Peru.
