= Curgos District =

Curgos
- District
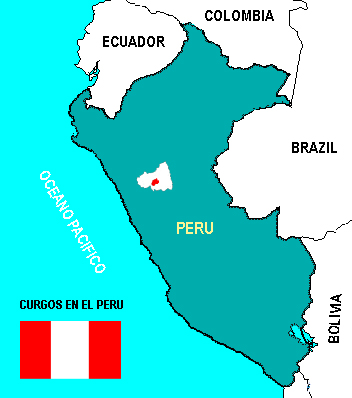
- Location of Curgos in the Sánchez Carrión province
- Country: Peru
- Region: La Libertad
- Province: Sánchez Carrión
- Founded: December 13, 1943
- Capital: Curgos

Government
  - Mayor: Santos Rios Caipo

Area
  - Total: 99.5 km^{2} (38.4 sq mi)
- Elevation: 3,225 m (10,581 ft)

Population (2005 census)
  - Total: 8,086
  - Density: 81.3/km^{2} (210/sq mi)
- Time zone: UTC-5 (PET)
- UBIGEO: 130904

Curgos District is one of eight districts of the province Sánchez Carrión in Peru.
