= Cascas District =

Cascas
- District
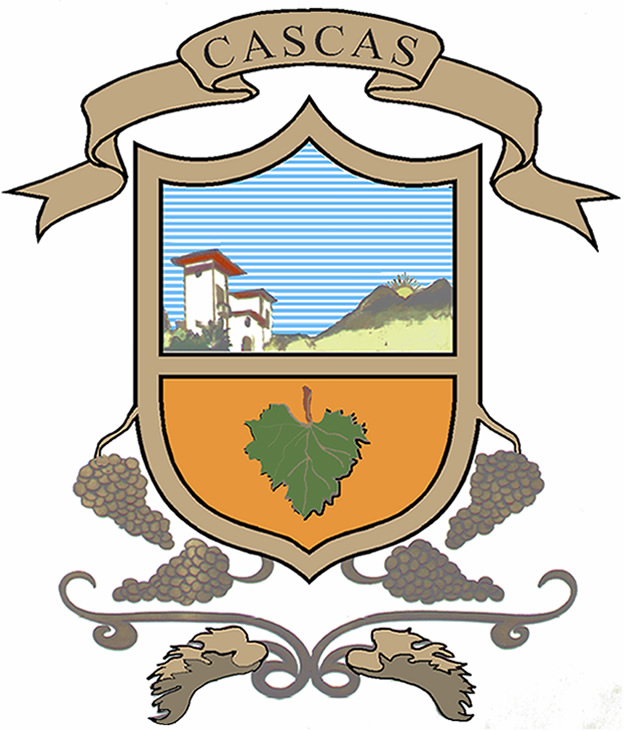
- Interactive map of Cascas
- Country: Peru
- Region: La Libertad
- Province: Gran Chimú
- Capital: Cascas

Government
  - Mayor: Joel David Diaz Velasquez

Area
  - Total: 465.67 km^{2} (179.80 sq mi)
- Elevation: 1,274 m (4,180 ft)

Population (2005 census)
  - Total: 14,839
  - Density: 31.866/km^{2} (82.532/sq mi)
- Time zone: UTC-5 (PET)
- UBIGEO: 131101

Cascas District is one of four districts of the province Gran Chimú in Peru.

== Climate ==
Climate data for Cascas, elevation 1,330 m (4,360 ft), (1995–2009)
Month	Jan	Feb	Mar	Apr	May	Jun	Jul	Aug	Sep	Oct	Nov	Dec	Year
Mean daily maximum °C (°F)	27.3 (81.1)	26.8 (80.2)	27.0 (80.6)	27.1 (80.8)	27.2 (81.0)	26.3 (79.3)	26.5 (79.7)	27.2 (81.0)	27.5 (81.5)	27.7 (81.9)	27.5 (81.5)	26.9 (80.4)	27.1 (80.8)
Mean daily minimum °C (°F)	16.4 (61.5)	17.4 (63.3)	17.4 (63.3)	16.6 (61.9)	15.3 (59.5)	14.0 (57.2)	13.5 (56.3)	13.8 (56.8)	14.5 (58.1)	15.4 (59.7)	15.5 (59.9)	15.9 (60.6)	15.5 (59.8)
Average precipitation mm (inches)	21.2 (0.83)	40.4 (1.59)	46.7 (1.84)	9.8 (0.39)	1.2 (0.05)	0.4 (0.02)	0.1 (0.00)	0.1 (0.00)	0.7 (0.03)	3.1 (0.12)	6.8 (0.27)	15.7 (0.62)	146.2 (5.76)
Source: Sistema Nacional de Información Ambiental
