= Condormarca District =

Condormarca Kunturmarka
- District
- Interactive map of Condormarca
- Country: Peru
- Region: La Libertad
- Province: Bolívar
- Founded: November 20, 1916
- Capital: Condormarca

Government
  - Mayor: Neil Sanchez Torres

Area
  - Total: 331.26 km^{2} (127.90 sq mi)
- Elevation: 2,939 m (9,642 ft)

Population (2017 census)
  - Total: 1,914
  - Density: 5.778/km^{2} (14.96/sq mi)
- Time zone: UTC-5 (PET)
- UBIGEO: 130303

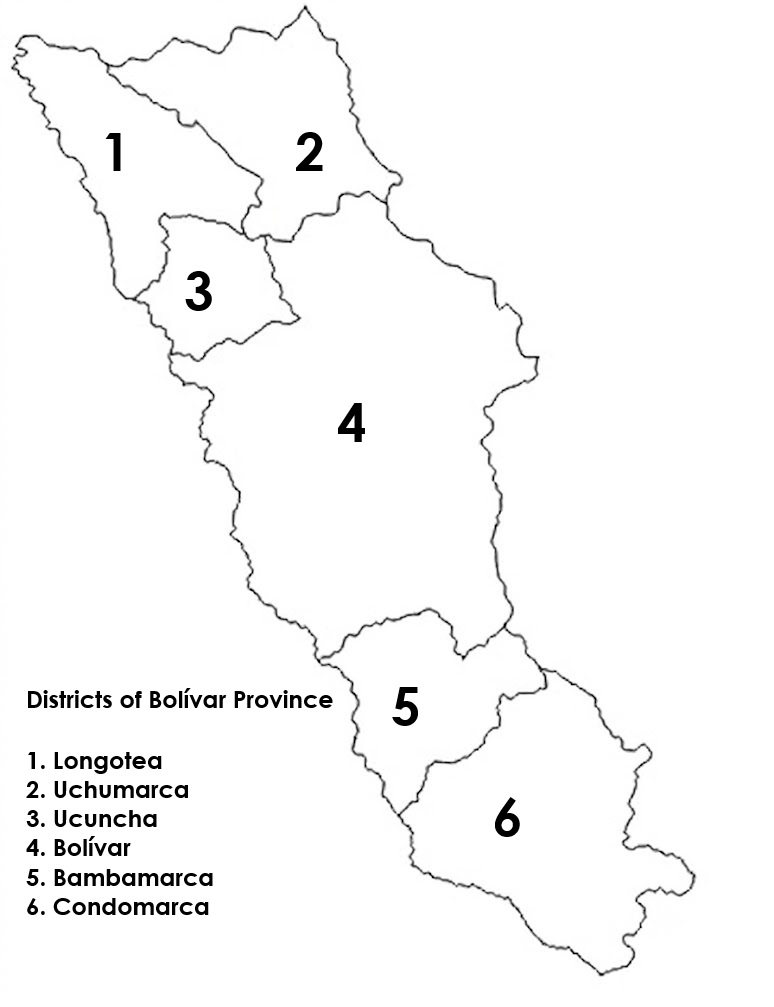
Districts of Bolívar Province

Condormarca or Kunturmarka (Quechua kuntur condor, marka village) is one of six districts of the province of Bolívar in Peru.

The district was created in 1916 in the same law that created Bolívar province (named Cajamarquilla until 1925).

The district had a population of 1,914 in the 2017 Peruvian census. The district capital of Condormarca had a population of 175.
