= Tayabamba =

Coordinates: 8.27689°S 77.2965°W

- Town
- Interactive map of Tayabamba
- Country: Peru
- Region: La Libertad
- Province: Pataz
- District: Tayabamba

Government
  - Mayor: Orler Medina Barrios
- Time zone: UTC-5 (PET)

Tayabamba is a city in Northern Peru, capital of the province Pataz in the region La Libertad. It is located to an altitude 3245 m.

== History ==
In the colonial times, the Spanish created three Corregimientos in the territory of this Region: Collay in the south, Pataz in the middle, and Cajamarquina in the north. In that time, there happened historical events of high importance to the region, as the visit of the Archbishop of Lima, Alfonso Toribio de Mogrovejo. In 1605, he arrived to Collay and extended his travel to the Huallaga valley. By the time, Tayabamba was a small village, and their inhabitants were dedicated to the mining in Pahuarchuco mountain and La Caldera, and to agriculture too. For the last activity, it is supposed that the inhabitants of the region built a dam, now located in the highlands of Tayabamba, between the caserios of Queros and Allauca, now known as the Gochapita lagoon. Now, the dam is used as a great pong, and its water irrigates the areas around Pahuarchuco mountain, being used for the local agriculture. It is said by the tradition that, while the later Saint Toribio de Mogrovejo was in the village, he made charity to poor and sick people in a high area in the exit of Tayabamba to the jungle. Later, in that area was built a chapel called, "Chapel of the Charity" or "the High of the Charity". He rested in the village of The Charity, and when he continued his travel to Collay, some inhabitants of the location followed him, but only to a place known as Pegoy. This event lead to the traditional "Saint Walk", celebrated every April 24.

After the abolition of the corregimientos in 1782, these territories were joined in the Party of Pataz, into the Intendancy of Trujillo.
