= Sánchez Carrión province =

Province of Peru

Coordinates: 7°48′44″S 78°02′51″W

Sánchez Carrión
- Province
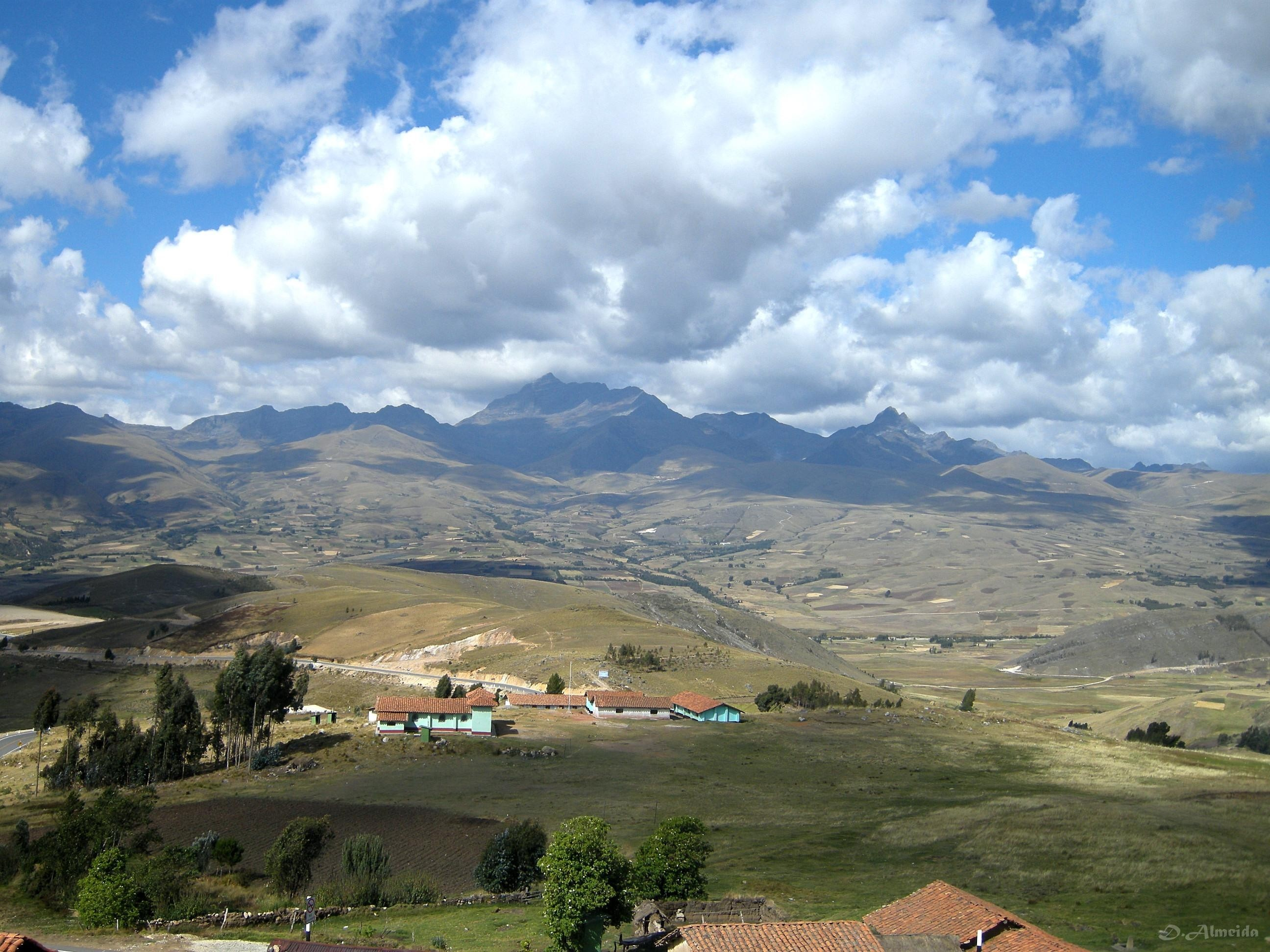
- The Andes close to Huamachuco, the capital of the Sánchez Carrión Province

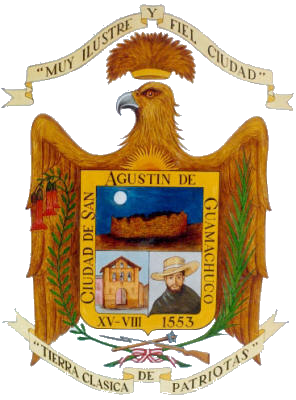
- Flag Coat of arms

- Location of Sánchez Carrión in La Libertad Region
- Country: Peru
- Region: La Libertad
- Capital: Huamachuco

Government
  - Mayor: Benito Robert Contreras Morales

Area
  - Total: 2,486.38 km^{2} (960.00 sq mi)

Population
  - Total: 144,405
  - Density: 58.0784/km^{2} (150.422/sq mi)
- UBIGEO: 1309

Sánchez Carrión, known until 1976 as Huamachuco, is one of twelve provinces of the La Libertad Region in Peru. It is named in honour of José Faustino Sánchez Carrión. The capital of this province is the city of Huamachuco. About 30 miles away is Marcahuamachuco, a prehistoric political and religious centre of a culture that throve AD 350-1100.

== Political division ==
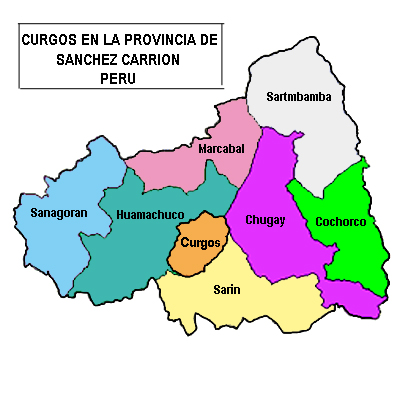
Map of the eight districts

The province is divided into eight districts, which are:

- Chugay
- Cochorco
- Curgos
- Huamachuco
- Marcabal
- Sanagorán
- Sarín
- Sartimbamba
