= La Cuesta District, Otuzco =

La Cuesta
- District
- Interactive map of La Cuesta
- Country: Peru
- Region: La Libertad
- Province: Otuzco
- Founded: May 14, 1876
- Capital: La Cuesta

Government
  - Mayor: Rosali Palermo Figueroa Gutierrez

Area
  - Total: 39.25 km^{2} (15.15 sq mi)
- Elevation: 1,874 m (6,148 ft)

Population (2005 census)
  - Total: 726
  - Density: 18.5/km^{2} (47.9/sq mi)
- Time zone: UTC-5 (PET)
- UBIGEO: 130606

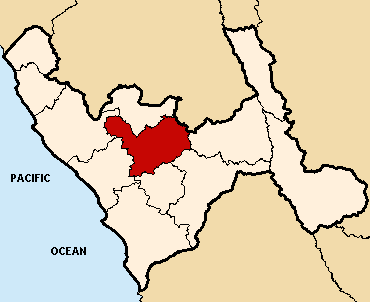
Location of the province Otuzco in the La Libertad region in Peru.

La Cuesta District is one of ten districts of the province Otuzco in Peru.
