= Pataz province =

Coordinates: 8.276892°S 77.296486°W

Pataz
- Province
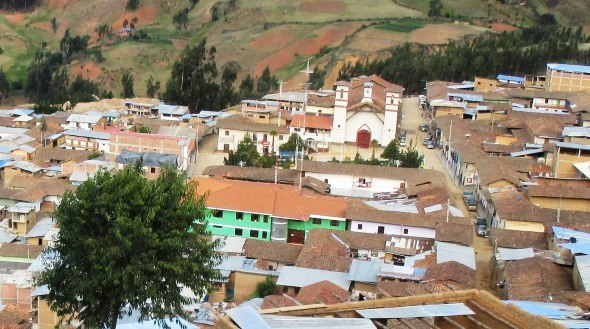

- Flag Coat of arms

- Location of Pataz in La Libertad Region
- Country: Peru
- Region: La Libertad
- Capital: Tayabamba

Government
  - Mayor: Orleer Medina Barrios (2007)

Area
  - Total: 4,226.53 km^{2} (1,631.87 sq mi)

Population
  - Total: 66,559
  - Density: 15.748/km^{2} (40.787/sq mi)
- UBIGEO: 1308
- Website: www.munipataz.gob.pe

Pataz is one of twelve provinces of the La Libertad Region in Peru. The capital of this province is the city of Tayabamba.

== History ==
The village of Pataz (now within Pataz District in the province) was founded on June 29, 1564 by Spanish explorers Pedro Contreras and Enrique Garcés.

A "Partido de Pataz" existed within Intendancy of Trujillo in the Viceroyalty of Peru prior to Peru's independence, and the corregimiento of Pataz (also called Cajamarquilla) existed before that. After independence was proclaimed in 1821, the province of Pataz was created within the Department of Trujillo, which was renamed the Department of La Libertad in 1825. The province was moved to new Department of Amazonas in 1832, but moved back to La Libertad in 1840, and the mining settlement of Parcoy was named capital of the province. The capital was moved to Tayabamba in 1895.

A portion of the province was separated into the new Bolívar province in 1916 (though called Cajamarquilla until 1925).

== Political division ==
The province is divided into thirteen districts, which are:

- Buldibuyo
- Chillia
- Huancaspata
- Huaylillas
- Huayo
- Ongón
- Parcoy
- Pataz
- Pías
- Santiago de Challas
- Taurija
- Tayabamba
- Urpay
