= 2004 World Monuments Watch =

Nonprofit advocacy program

The World Monuments Watch is a flagship advocacy program of the New York–based private non-profit organization World Monuments Fund (WMF) that is dedicated to preserving the historic, artistic, and architectural heritage around the world.

== Selection process ==
Every two years, it publishes a select list known as the Watch List of 100 Most Endangered Sites that is in urgent need of preservation funding and protection. It is a call to action on behalf of threatened cultural heritage monuments worldwide. The sites are nominated by governments, conservation professionals, site caretakers, non-government organizations (NGOs), concerned individuals, and others working in the field. An independent panel of international experts then select 100 candidates from these entries to be part of the Watch List, based on the significance of the sites, the urgency of the threat, and the viability of both advocacy and conservation solutions. A site’s inclusion on the Watch List attracts international attention, helping to raise funds needed for its rescue and spurring local governments and communities to take an active role in protecting the cultural landmark.

== 2004 Watch List ==
The 2004 World Monuments Watch List of 100 Most Endangered Sites was launched on 24 September 2003 by WMF President Bonnie Burnham and WMF partner American Express. For the first time, a site from Antarctica was included, ensuring that the Watch List geographically covers every continent.

By working to preserve these treasures, WMF and its partners are helping to save for future generations the structures and places that tell us who we are. Be it a palace, a cave painting, an archaeological site, or a town, the sites on the Watch list speak of human aspirations and achievements. To lose any one of them would diminish us all.

— Bonnie Burnham, WMF president, launch of 2004 Watch List

=== List by country/territory ===
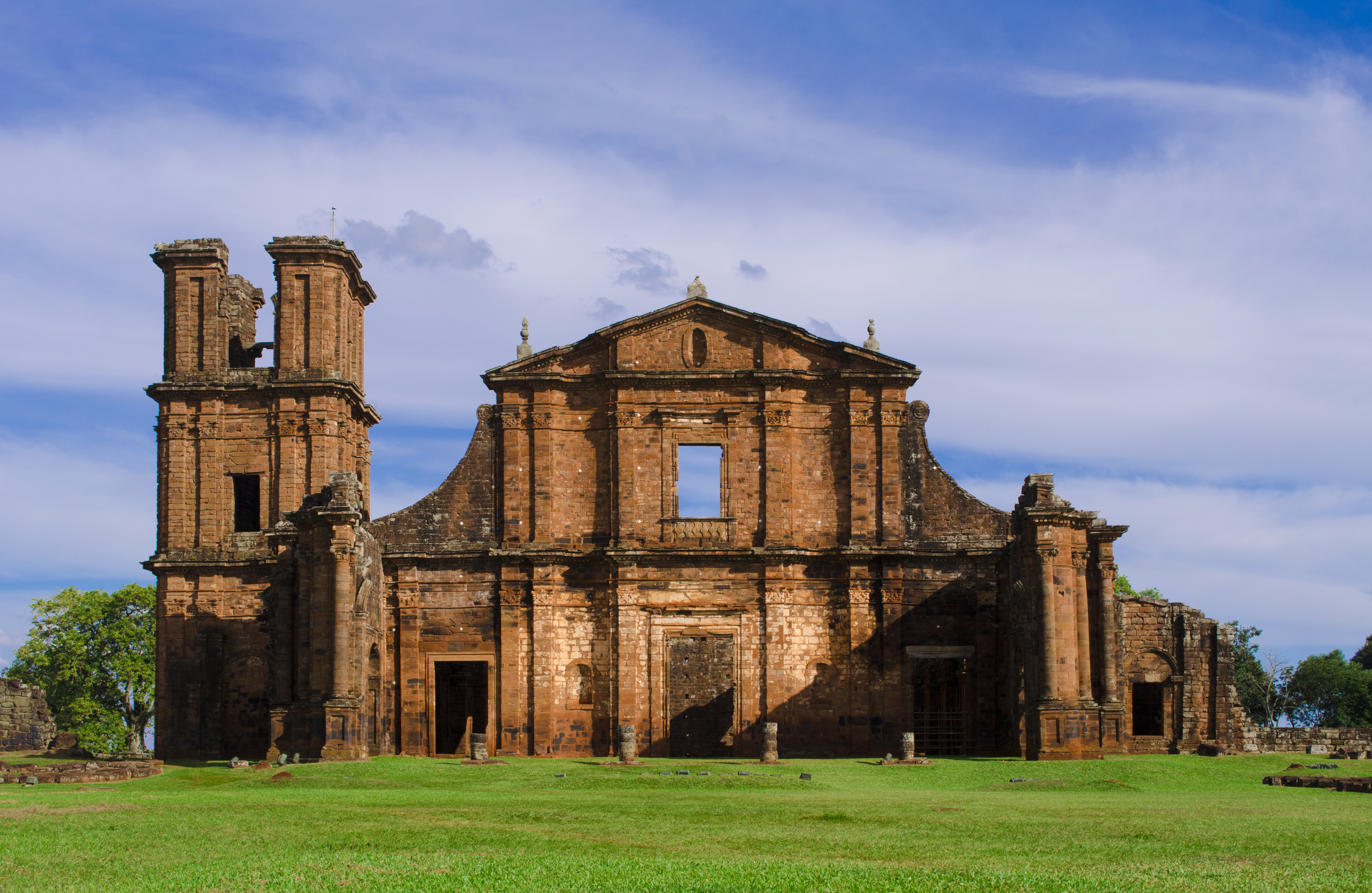
The ruins of São Miguel das Missões in the south of Brazil is one of the elements of the Jesuit Guaraní Missions serial site.

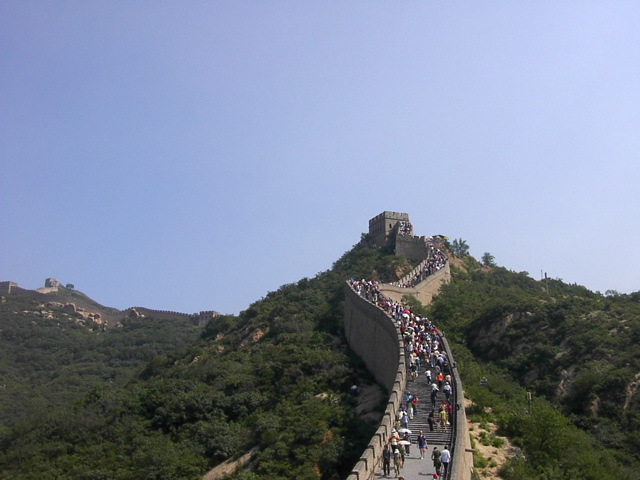
The Beijing portion of the Great Wall has suffered from vandalism and erosion by tourists.

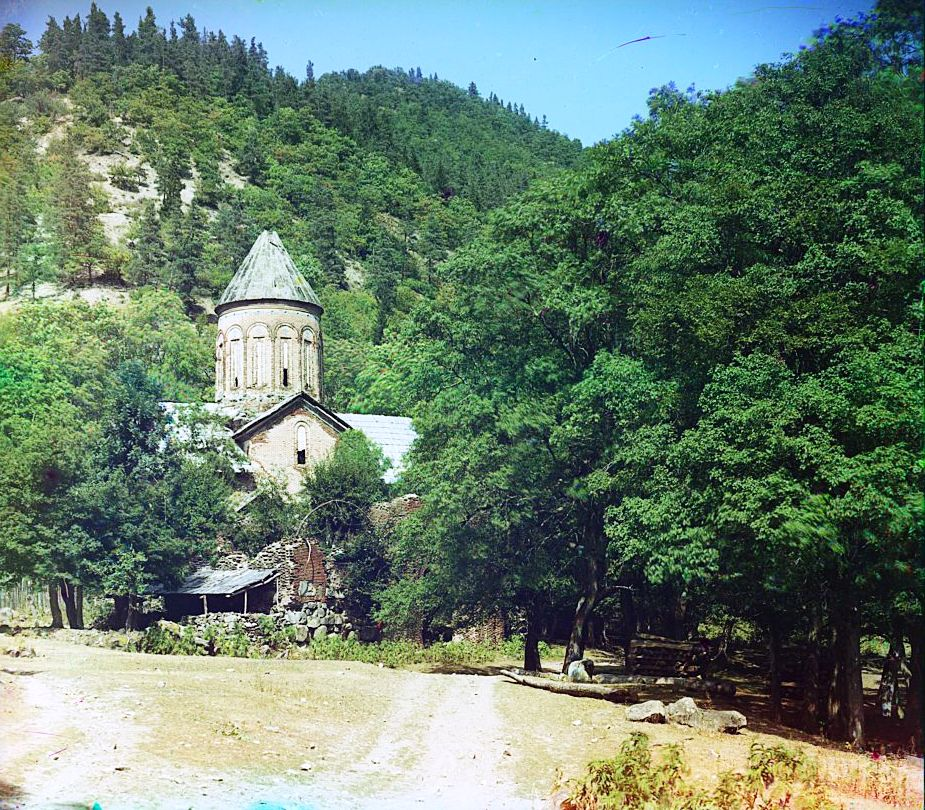
The Timotesubani Virgin Church was constructed during the Golden Age of medieval Georgia in the early 13th century.

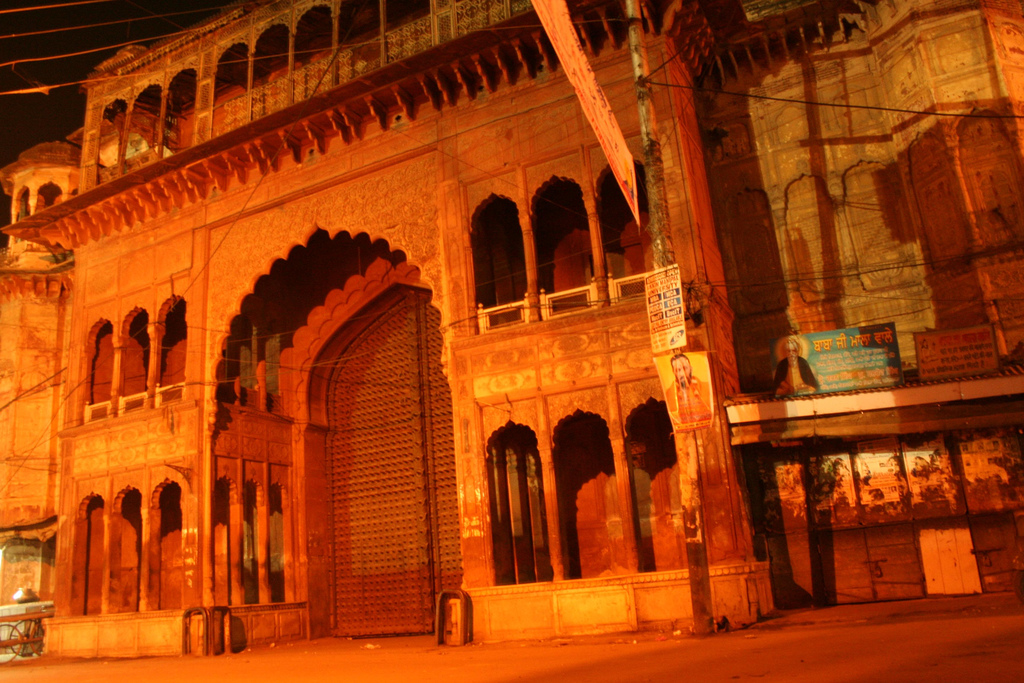
Punjab's Quila Mubarak, Patiala has been declared a Historical National Monument of India.

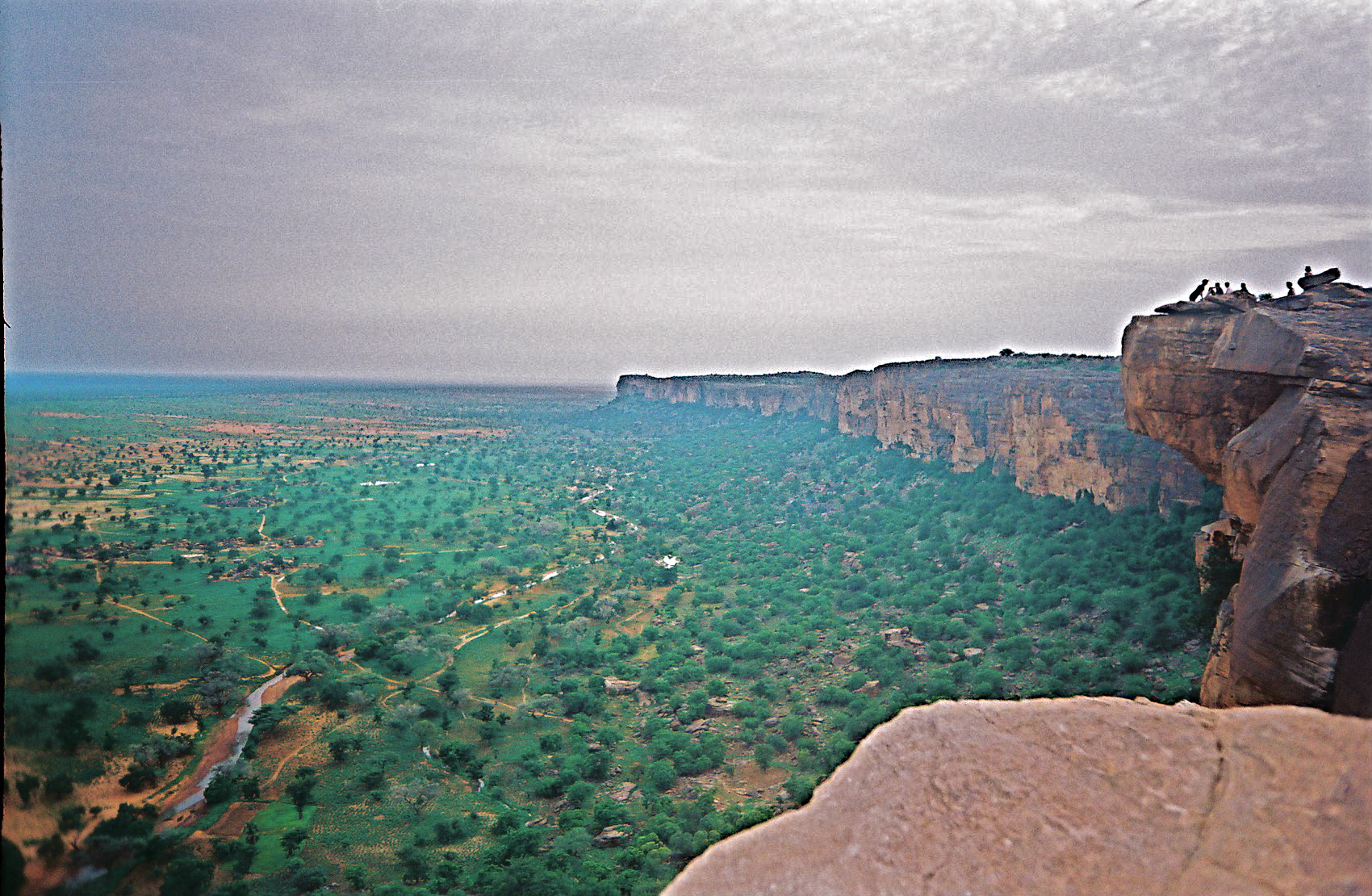
The Bandiagara Escarpment, home of the Dogon people, was declared as Mali's third World Heritage Site by UNESCO in 1989.

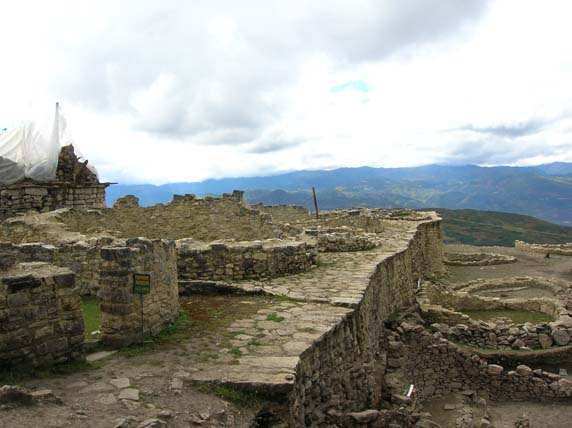
Kuelap Fortress is one of the four Peruvian sites on the 2004 Watch List.

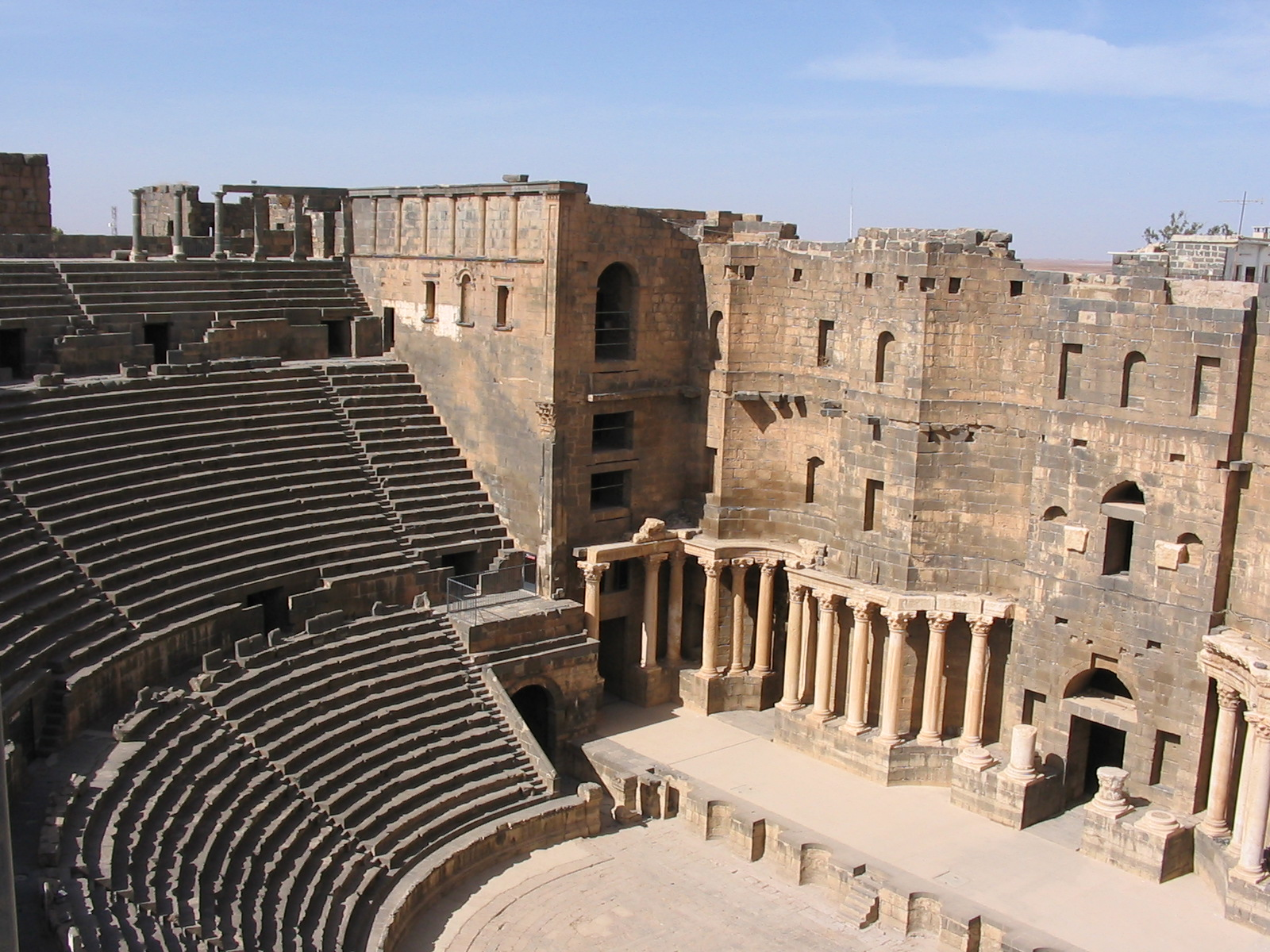
The ancient city of Bosra in Syria served as the capital of the Roman province of Arabia Petraea in the early 2nd century AD.

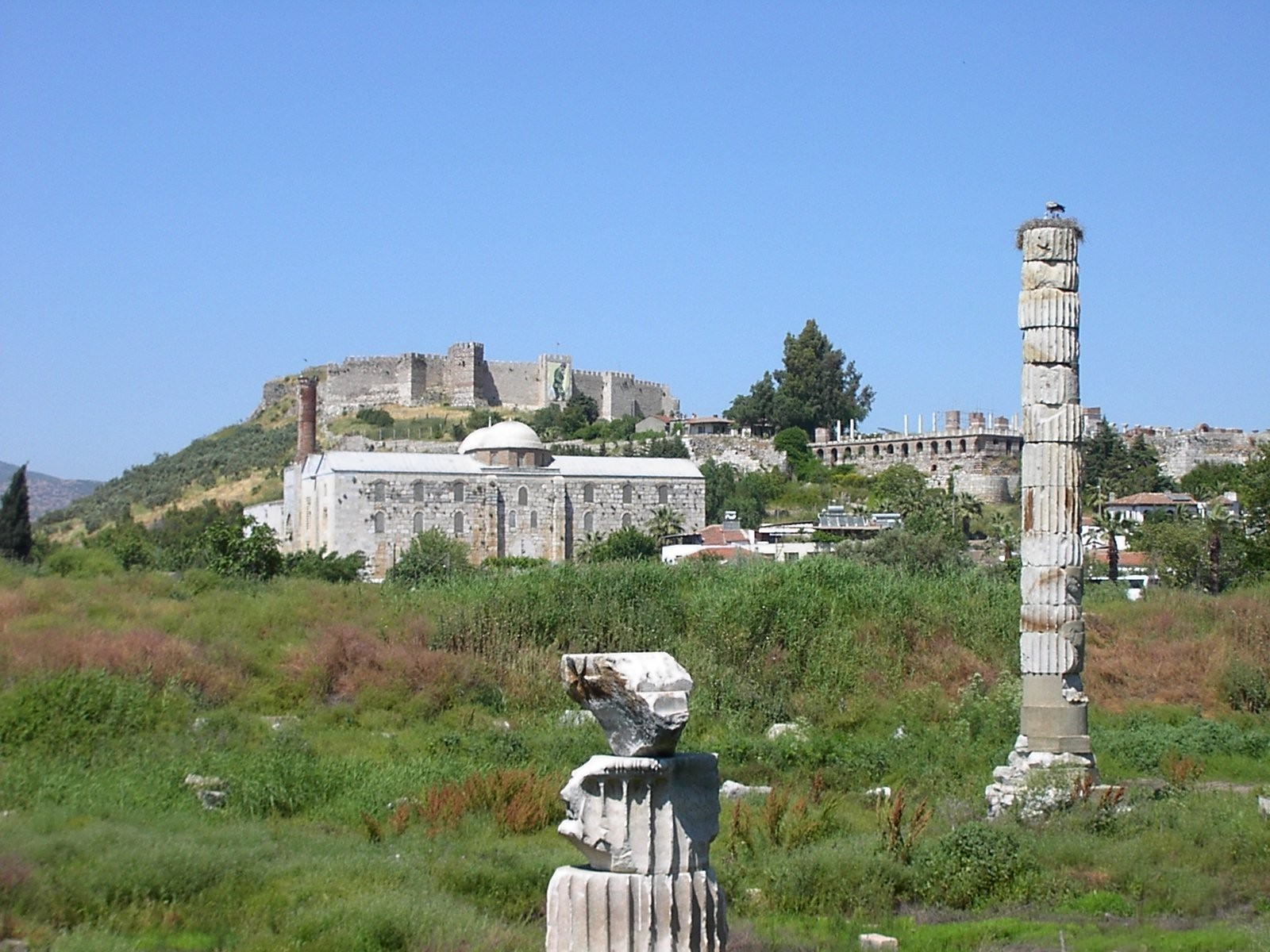
The Turkish archaeological site of Ephesus was once the site of the Temple of Artemis, one of the Seven Wonders of the Ancient World.

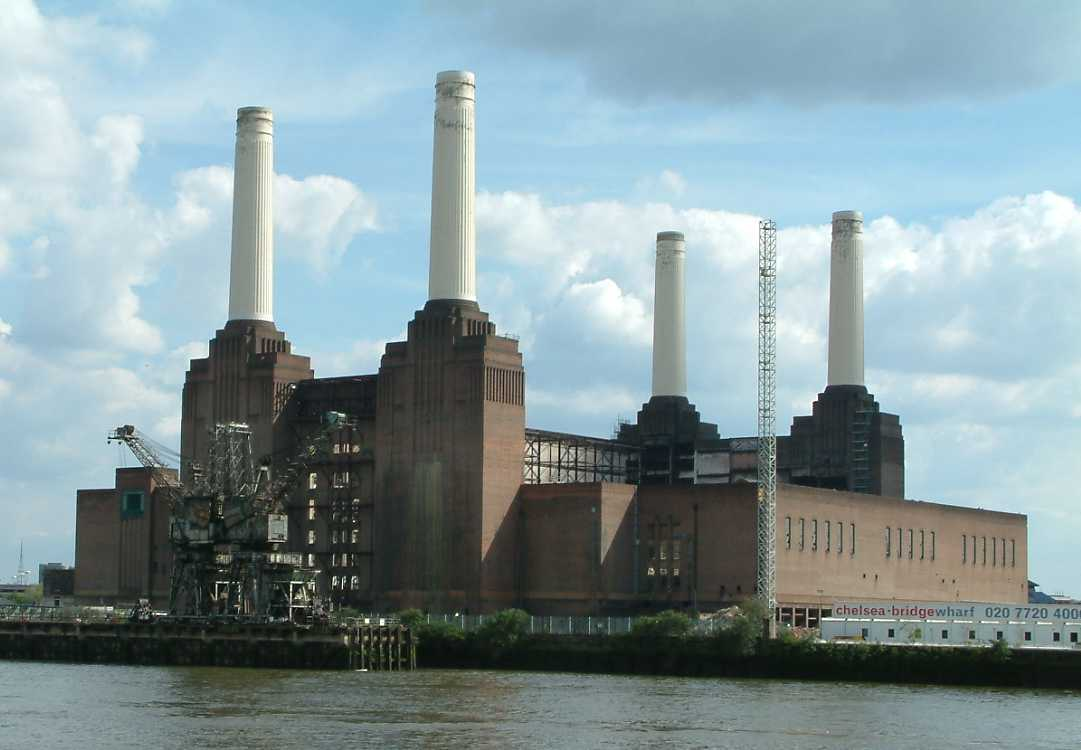
London's Battersea Power Station is the largest brick building in Europe, and is notable for its original, lavish Art Deco interior fittings and decor.

| Number^{[A]} | Country/Territory | Site^{[B]} | Location^{[C]} |
| 1 | Afghanistan | Ghazni Minarets | Ghazni |
| 2 | Albania | Voskopojë Churches | Korcë |
| 3 | Antarctica | Sir Ernest Shackleton's Expedition Hut | Cape Royds, Ross Island |
| 4 | Argentina, Brazil & Paraguay | Jesuit Guaraní Missions | |
| 5 | Australia | Dampier Rock Art Complex | Dampier, Dampier Archipelago |
| 6 | Bolivia | Vallegrande Area Rock Art Sites | Vallegrande and Saipina |
| 7 | Brazil | San Francisco Convent | Olinda |
| 8 | Bulgaria | Vidin Synagogue | Vidin |
| 9 | Canada | St. John's Anglican Church | Lunenburg, Nova Scotia |
| 10 | Chile | Humberstone & Santa Laura Industrial complex | Iquique |
| 11 | China | Ohel Rachel Synagogue | Shanghai |
| 12 | China | Great Wall of China Cultural Landscape (Beijing) | Beijing |
| 13 | China | Cockcrow Postal Town | Cockrow Post, Huailai County, Hebei |
| 14 | China | Puning Temple Statues | Chengde City, Hebei Province |
| 15 | China | Tianshui Traditional Houses | Tianshui City, Gansu Province |
| 16 | Cuba | Calzada del Cerro | Havana |
| 17 | Czech Republic | Saint Anne's Church | Prague |
| 18 | Czech Republic | Chotesov Monastery | Chotesov |
| 19 | Ecuador | Las Peñas | Guayaquil – Guayas |
| 20 | Ecuador | Bolivar Theater | Quito |
| 21 | Egypt | Khasekhemwy at Hierakonpolis | Edfu, El Muissat, Kom el Ahmar |
| 22 | Egypt | Mortuary Temple of Amenhotep III | Luxor, West Bank |
| 23 | Egypt | Sabil Ruqayya Dudu | Cairo |
| 24 | El Salvador | San Miguel Arcangel and Santa Cruz de Roma churches | Panchimalco & Huizucar |
| 25 | Finland | Helsinki-Malmi Airport | Helsinki |
| 26 | Georgia | Timotesubani Virgin Church | Timotesubani village, Borjomi Region |
| 27 | Greece | Palaikastro Archaeological site | Palaikastro |
| 28 | Greece | Helike Archaeological Site | Rizomylos & Eliki, Achaia |
| 29 | Guatemala | Usumacinta River Cultural Landscape | Chiapas, Mexico/Peten, Guatemala |
| 30 | Hungary | Túrony Church | Túrony |
| 31 | India | Osmania University College for Women | Hyderabad, Telangana |
| 32 | India | Quila Mubarak | Patiala, Punjab |
| 33 | India | Dalhousie Square | Calcutta |
| 34 | India | Bhuj Darbargadh | Bhuj, Gujarat |
| 35 | Indonesia | Omo Hada | Nias, Teluk Dalam, Hilinawalo Mazingo |
| 36 | Indonesia | Tamansari Water Castle | Yogyakarta |
| 37 | Iraq | Nineveh and Nimrud Palaces | near Mosul |
| 38 | Iraq | Citadel of Arbil | Erbil, Kurdistan Region |
| 39 | Ireland | Headfort House | Kells |
| 40 | Ireland | Athassel abbey | Athassel |
| 41 | Israel | Apollonia-Arsuf | Herzliya |
| 42 | Italy | Port of Trajan Archaeological Park | Fiumicino (Rome-Lazio Region) |
| 43 | Italy | Tuff-Towns and Vie Cave | Pitigliano, Sorano, Manciano, Tuscany |
| 44 | Jamaica | Falmouth Historic Town | Falmouth, Parish of Trelawny |
| 45 | Japan | Tomo Port Town | Fukuyama |
| 46 | Jordan | 'Ain Ghazal | Amman |
| 47 | Kenya | Mtwapa Heritage Site | Kilifi, Mtwapa |
| 48 | Lebanon | Iskandarouna – Naqoura Cultural Landscape | Iskandarouna, Naqoura, Tyre |
| 49 | Mali | Bandiagara Escarpment Cultural Landscape | Bandiagara, Mopti |
| 50 | Mexico | San Francisco de Tzintzuntzan Convent | Tzintzuntzan, Michoacan |
| 51 | Mexico | Quetzalcoatl Temple | Teotihuacan, Mexico State |
| 52 | Mexico | La Tercena | Metztitlan |
| 53 | Mexico | Oxtotitlan Paintings | Guerrero, Chilapa |
| 54 | Mexico | Pimeria Alta Missions | Sonora |
| 55 | Mongolia | Geser Sum Monastery | Ulaanbaatar |
| 56 | Morocco | Sahrij & Sbaiyin Madrassa Complex | Fez |
| 57 | Nigeria | Benin City Earthworks | Benin City, Edo State |
| 58 | Palestinian Territories | Tell Balatah (Shechem or Ancient Nablus) | Nablus/West Bank |
| 59 | Palestinian Territories | Al-Qasem Palace | Beit Wazan |
| 60 | Panama | Panama Canal Area | Panama and Colon Provinces |
| 61 | Paraguay | Paraguay Railway System | Asunción to Sapucay |
| 62 | Peru | Our Lady of Guadalupe Monastery | Guadalupe, La Libertad |
| 63 | Peru | Angasmarca Temple | Angasmarca/Santiago de Chuco/La Libertad |
| 64 | Peru | Kuelap Fortress | Kuelap, Amazonas |
| 65 | Peru | Tucume Archaeological Complex | Tucume |
| 66 | Poland | Old Lublin Theater | Lublin |
| 67 | Portugal | Roman Villa of Rabaçal | Rabaçal, Penela, Coimbra |
| 68 | Russia | The Chinese Palace at Oranienbaum | Lomonosov |
| 69 | Russia | Narcomfin Building | Moscow |
| 70 | Russia | Perm-36 | Perm Region |
| 71 | Slovakia | Three Greek Catholic churches | Bodruzal, Lukov-Venecia, Topola |
| 72 | Slovenia | Lanthieri Manor | Vipava |
| 73 | South Africa | Richtersveld Cultural Landscape | Richtersveld, Northern Cape Province |
| 74 | Spain | Pazo de San Miguel das Peñas | Monterroso, Lugo, Galicia |
| 75 | Syria | Bosra Ancient City | Bosra, governorate of Deraa |
| 76 | Syria | Amrit Archaeological Site | Amrit |
| 77 | Taiwan | Jungshe Village | Penghu, Wangan |
| 78 | Trinidad and Tobago | Banwari Trace Archaeological Site | Ward of Siparia |
| 79 | Turkey | Temple of Augustus | Ankara |
| 80 | Turkey | Little Hagia Sophia Mosque (Kucuk Ayasofya Camii) | Istanbul |
| 81 | Turkey | Central İzmir Synagogues | Konak, İzmir |
| 82 | Turkey | Ephesus Archaeological Site | Selçuk, İzmir |
| 83 | Turkey | Kariye Museum | Istanbul |
| 84 | Turkmenistan | Old Nisa | Bagir settlement |
| 85 | Uganda | Kampala Historic Buildings | Kampala |
| 86 | Ukraine | Tyras-Belgorod Fortress | Bilhorod-Dnistrovskyi, Odesa |
| 87 | Ukraine | Panticapaeum Ancient City | Kerch, Crimea |
| 88 | United Kingdom | Stowe House | Stowe, Buckingham, Buckinghamshire |
| 89 | United Kingdom | Battersea Power Station | London |
| 90 | United Kingdom | Strawberry Hill | London |
| 91 | United Kingdom | Saint Vincent’s Street Church | Glasgow, Scotland |
| 92 | United States of America | St. Ann and the Holy Trinity Church | Brooklyn Heights, New York |
| 93 | United States of America | Historic Lower Manhattan | New York, New York |
| 94 | United States of America | Ennis Brown House | Los Angeles, California |
| 95 | United States of America | North Family Shaker Site | New Lebanon, New York |
| 96 | United States of America | Iglesia San Jose | San Juan, Puerto Rico |
| 97 | United States of America | Plum Orchard Historic District | Cumberland Island, Georgia |
| 98 | Venezuela | Real Fuerza de Santiago de Arroyo | Araya |
| 99 | Venezuela | La Guaira Historic City | Vargas |
| 100 | Yugoslavia | Prizren Historic Center | Kosovo, Prizren |

== Statistics by country/territory ==
The following countries/territories have multiple sites entered on the 2004 Watch List, listed by the number of sites:

| Number of sites | Country/Territory |
|---|---|
| 6 | United States of America |
| 5 | China, Mexico and Turkey |
| 4 | India, Peru and United Kingdom |
| 3 | Egypt and Russia |
| 2 | Argentina^{[D]}, Brazil^{[D]}, Czech Republic, Ecuador, Greece, Indonesia, Iraq, Ireland, Italy, Palestine, Paraguay^{[D]}, Syria, Ukraine and Venezuela |

== Notes ==
A. Numbers list only meant as a guide on this article. No official reference numbers have been designated for the sites on the Watch List.
B. Names and spellings used for the sites were based on the official 2004 Watch List as published.
C. The references to the sites' locations were based on the official 2004 Watch List as published.
D. Tally includes the transfrontier site of Jesuit Guaraní Missions.
