= Sitabamba =

- Flag

- Location within Peru
- Coordinates: 8°01′19″S 77°58′26″W
- Time zone: UTC-5 (PET)
- Postal code: 131008
- Area code: 044

Sitabamba is a Peruvian town, capital of the Sitabamba District of the Santiago de Chuco Province in the Department of La Libertad. It is located approximately 226 kilometers southeast of the city of Trujillo.

== See also ==
- Department of La Libertad
- Province of Santiago de Chuco
- Trujillo
