= Elias Rodriguez (disambiguation) =

Elias Rodriguez is the person accused of the 2025 assassinations of two Israeli Embassy workers in Washington, D.C.

Elias Rodriguez may also refer to:

- Elias Rodriguez (agricultural technician), the founder and President of the Bolivian left-wing political party, Front for Victory
- Elias Rodriguez (athlete) (born 1964), a former Olympic marathon runner from Micronesia
- Elias "Bones Elias" Rodriguez, drummer for American metal band, The Union Underground
- Elías Nicolás Rodríguez Zavaleta (born 1974), Peruvian lawyer and Congressman
