= Elías Rodríguez =

Peruvian lawyer and politician

Elías Rodríguez Zavaleta
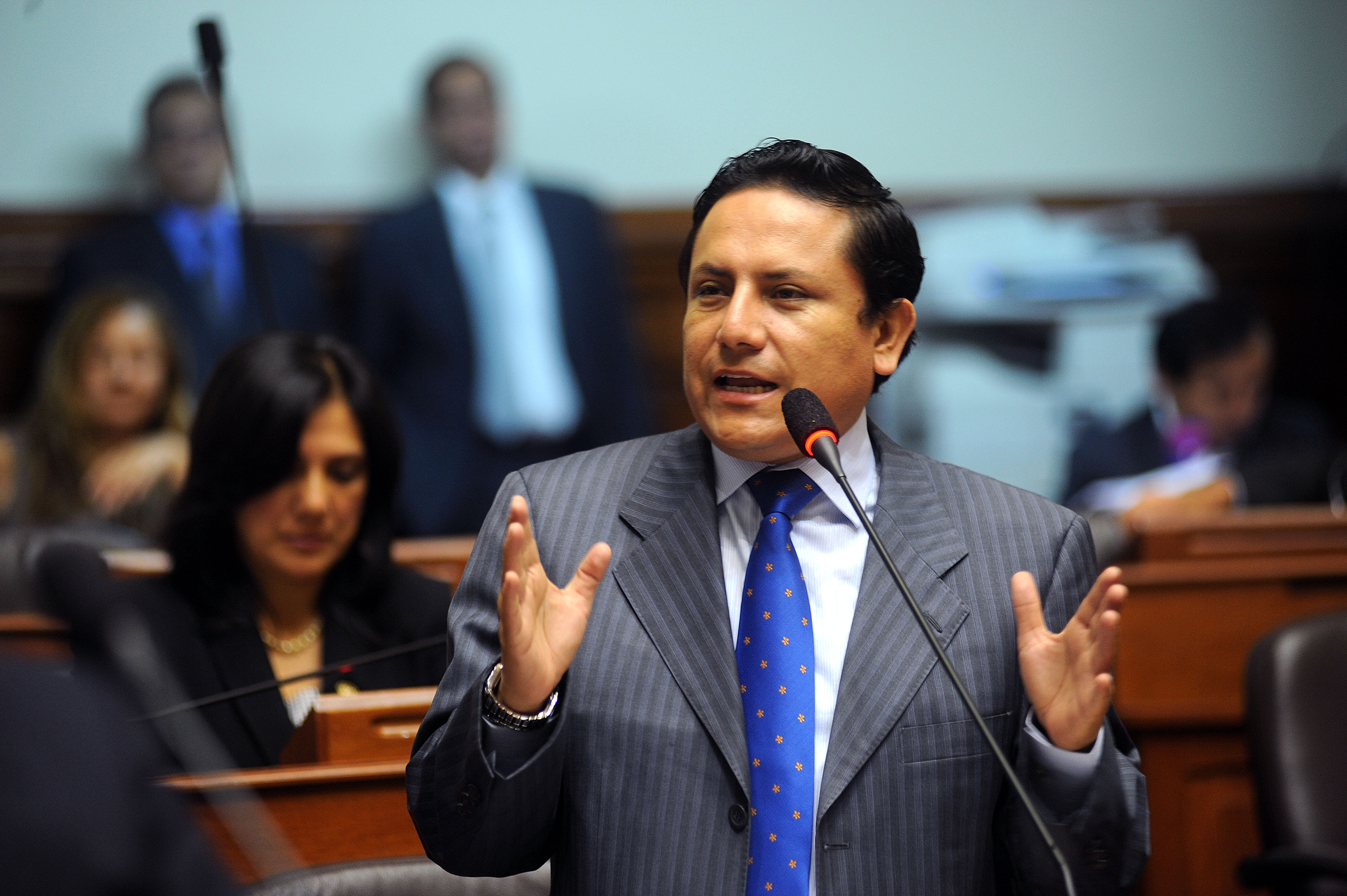

Member of Congress
- In office 26 July 2006 – 30 September 2019
- Constituency: La Libertad

Third Vice President of Congress
- In office 26 July 2016 – 21 September 2016
- President: Luz Salgado
- Preceded by: Luis Galarreta
- Succeeded by: Luciana León

Member of the Trujillo Province Council
- In office 1 January 2003 – 26 July 2006

Institutional General Secretary of the Peruvian Aprista Party
- In office 8 July 2017 – 24 October 2021
- President: Alan García; César Trelles
- Preceded by: Omar Quesada
- Succeeded by: Belén García Mendoza

Personal details
- Born: Elías Nicolás Rodríguez Zavaleta; 22 July 1974 (age 52) Quiruvilca, Santiago de Chuco, La Libertad, Peru
- Party: Trabajo Más Trabajo (2021-present)
- Other political affiliations: Peruvian Aprista Party (2008-2021)
- Education: Antenor Orrego Private University (LLB)
- Occupation: Politician

Elías Nicolás Rodríguez Zavaleta (born 22 July 1974) is a Peruvian lawyer and politician who served in Congress representing La Libertad region from 2006 until the dissolution of Congress by president Martín Vizcarra in 2019.

A former member of the Peruvian Aprista Party, Rodríguez was expelled from the party in October 2021 for alleged treason as he served as Institutional General Secretary and simultaneously led an independent regional movement.

At the 2022 regional elections, Rodríguez ran for governor of La Libertad Region under the Trabajo Más Trabajo regional movement, placing second and losing to César Acuña from Alliance for Progress.

== Biography ==
He completed his secondary studies at the José Faustino Sánchez Carrión School, and graduated from the Faculty of Law and Political Sciences of the Antenor Orrego University of Trujillo.

== Career ==
=== Early political career ===
From 1990 to 1991, as a student of the Antenor Orrego Private University, Elías Rodríguez was the Secretary of Culture of the Aprista Party's youth wing (Juventud Aprista Peruana) on a regional level. Since 1996 he holds a Licentiate degree in law. From 1998 to 2002 he worked as an external legal advisor to the Trujillo provincial municipality. In the 2000 elections, he ran for a seat in the Congress under the Peruvian Aprista Party, but he was not elected. Two years later, in the 2002 municipal elections, Rodríguez ran for a seat in the Provincial Council of Trujillo, and was elected provincial councillor for a four-year term. He served as provincial councillor until he was elected Congressman in the 2006 elections.

=== Peruvian Congress ===
In the 2006 election, he was elected Congressman representing La Libertad for the 2006–2011 term under the Peruvian Aprista Party. In the 2011 election, he was re-elected for another five-year term. In the 2016 election, he was re-elected for another five-year term under the Popular Alliance, which consisted of the APRA, PPC and VP, but his term was cut short by the dissolution of Congress by President Martín Vizcarra in September 2019.

=== Partisan controversy and regional politics ===
From 2017 to 2021, Rodríguez served as the Institutional Secretary General of the Peruvian Aprista Party until his expulsion from the party on 24 October 2021 for alleged treason as he led in parallel the Trabajo Más Trabajo (Work More Work) regional movement in order to run for governor at the 2022 regional elections.

At the gubernatorial election held on 2 October 2022, Rodríguez placed second behind former governor and Alliance for Progress leader César Acuña.
