= Calipuy National Sanctuary =

Protected area in Peru

- Santuario Nacional de Calipuy
- IUCN category III (natural monument or feature)
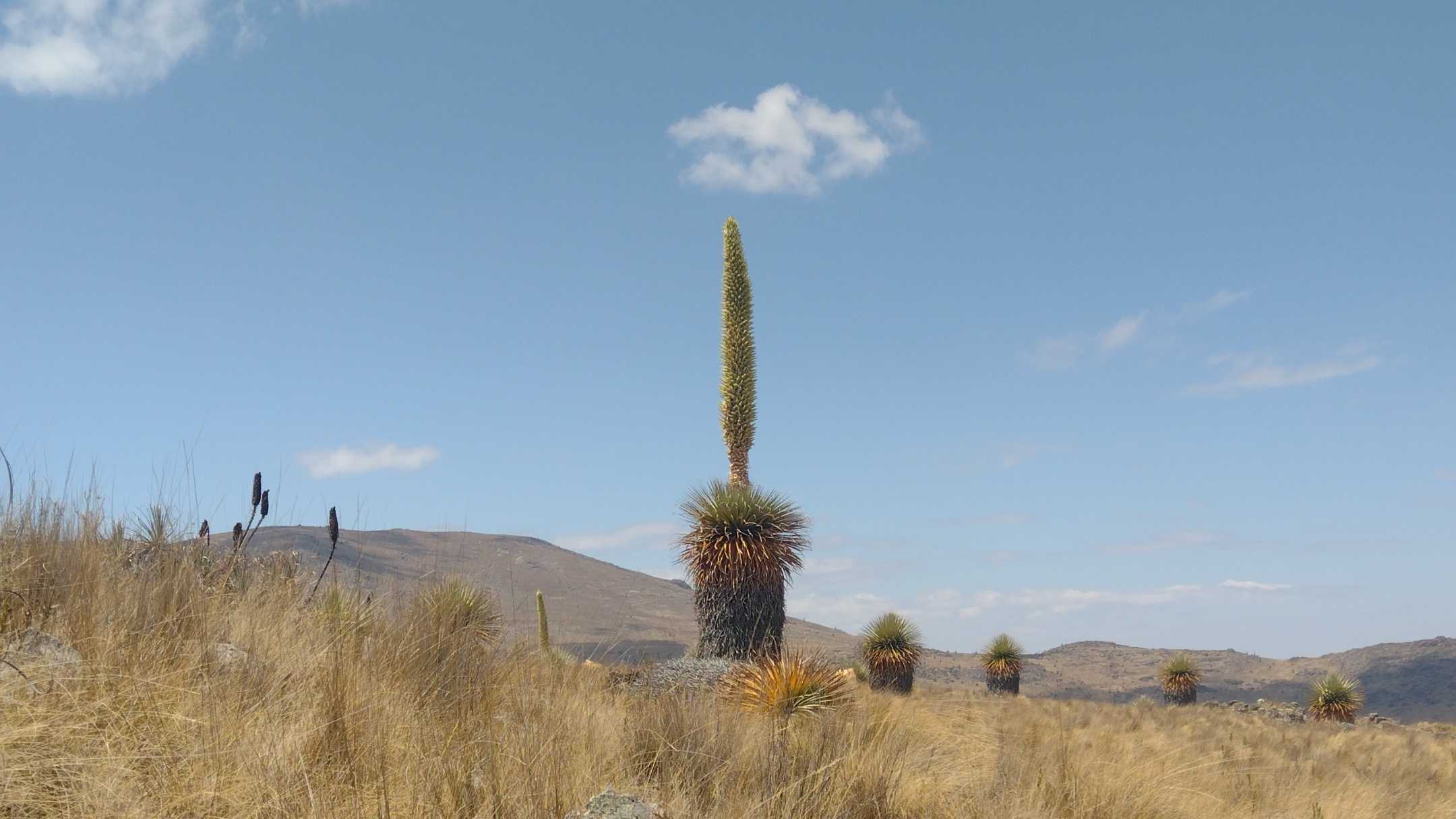
- Puya raimondii in the National Sanctuary

- Location within Peru
- Location: Peru; Santiago de Chuco Province, La Libertad
- Coordinates: 8.349°S 78.295°W
- Area: 4,500-hectare (11,000-acre)
- Established: 1981
- Governing body: SERNANP

Calipuy National Sanctuary is a Peruvian protected area created on January 8, 1981. The 4,500-hectare (11,000-acre) sanctuary, adjacent to the larger Calipuy National Reserve, is located in the Santiago de Chuco Province of the La Libertad region in northwestern Peru.

The Calipuy National Sanctuary, located high in the Andes Mountains, encompasses a variety of habitats. Species protected by the sanctuary include the queen-of-the-Andes and the guanaco.

== History ==
Prior to the creation of the sanctuary, the area was part of private estates which were expropriated during the agrarian reform of 1969 by the military dictatorship. These lands were given to the Agrarian Society of Social Interest (an association of former estate workers) Libertad N°18 in October 1972 and the designated 3,000 hectares of land became a protected area. However, due to terrorism in the late 1980s to early 1990s, the area could no longer be protected. The area was later recovered and is now managed by National Institute of Natural Resources (INRENA) which is part of the Ministry of Agriculture.

== Geography ==
The Calipuy National Sanctuary covers 4,500 hectares of land and is located adjacent to the Calipuy National Reserve in the Andes Mountains of northern Peru. The topography of the land varies from plains to slopes.

During winter, temperatures here are cold with low precipitation, ranging from 280 to 500 mm. In summer, precipitation can reach up to 1,200 mm in the highlands. Rainfall varies during the rest of the year, however, the lack of climate stations near the sanctuary limits access to accurate climate measurements. Access to water from the reserve is seasonal but there are some old irrigation canals that provide water to the area.

== Ecology ==
=== Flora ===
Most plants are small to medium in size and grow in rocky areas. The density of vegetation is highest along the hillsides of the sanctuary, with the main species being Puya raimondii. There are 3,000 to 4,000 of these plants in the Calipuy National Sanctuary, reaching up to 6 meters tall.

Other species in the sanctuary include: Cheilanthes gruinata, Stenomesson coccineum, Calliandra expansa, Lupinus sp., Verbena clavata, Salvia oppositiflora, Satureja spp., Urocarpidum sp., Arcythopphyllum thymifolium, Baccharis latifolia, etc.

=== Fauna ===
One of the purposes of creating the Calipuy National Sanctuary and national reserve was for the protection of the guanaco. The population of this species has declined to 400-500 individuals from the 1,000 individuals that were estimated to be present in the area in 1965.

Other species of mammals present in the sanctuary and the reserve include: the puma, the Sechuran fox, the Andean fox, the long-tailed weasel, the white-tailed deer, the spectacled bear, the northern viscacha, etc.

Species of birds found in the sanctuary include: the Andean condor, the black vulture, the scarlet-fronted parakeet, the ornate tinamou, the black-winged ground dove, the chiguanco thrush, the Andean swallow, the rufous-collared sparrow, etc.
