= Mollepata District, Santiago de Chuco =

Mollepata Mullipata
- District
- Interactive map of Mollepata
- Country: Peru
- Region: La Libertad
- Province: Santiago de Chuco
- Capital: Mollepata

Government
  - Mayor: Simon Walter Avila Lavado

Area
  - Total: 71.2 km^{2} (27.5 sq mi)
- Elevation: 2,680 m (8,790 ft)

Population (2005 census)
  - Total: 2,851
  - Density: 40.0/km^{2} (104/sq mi)
- Time zone: UTC-5 (PET)
- UBIGEO: 131005

Mollepata or Mullipata (Quechua mulli Peruvian pepper tree pata elevated place / edge, bank (of a river), shore) is one of eight districts of the province Santiago de Chuco in Peru.

== Climate ==
Climate data for Mollepata, elevation 2,708 m (8,885 ft), (1991–2020)
| Month | Jan | Feb | Mar | Apr | May | Jun | Jul | Aug | Sep | Oct | Nov | Dec | Year |
|---|---|---|---|---|---|---|---|---|---|---|---|---|---|
| Mean daily maximum °C (°F) | 21.6 (70.9) | 21.5 (70.7) | 20.8 (69.4) | 21.3 (70.3) | 21.9 (71.4) | 22.3 (72.1) | 22.6 (72.7) | 23.3 (73.9) | 23.1 (73.6) | 22.4 (72.3) | 22.6 (72.7) | 21.5 (70.7) | 22.1 (71.7) |
| Mean daily minimum °C (°F) | 11.0 (51.8) | 11.4 (52.5) | 11.4 (52.5) | 10.6 (51.1) | 9.8 (49.6) | 9.0 (48.2) | 8.8 (47.8) | 9.7 (49.5) | 10.5 (50.9) | 10.6 (51.1) | 10.4 (50.7) | 11.0 (51.8) | 10.4 (50.6) |
| Average precipitation mm (inches) | 100.5 (3.96) | 113.2 (4.46) | 164.3 (6.47) | 62.4 (2.46) | 15.7 (0.62) | 3.5 (0.14) | 1.2 (0.05) | 1.1 (0.04) | 9.8 (0.39) | 38.5 (1.52) | 38.4 (1.51) | 75.6 (2.98) | 624.2 (24.6) |
Source: National Meteorology and Hydrology Service of Peru
