= Calipuy National Reserve =

Protected area in Peru

- Reserva Nacional de Calipuy
- IUCN category VI (protected area with sustainable use of natural resources)
- Location within Peru
- Interactive map of Calipuy National Reserve
- Location: La Libertad, Peru
- Coordinates: 8.569°S 78.325°W
- Area: 25 km^{2} (9.7 mi^{2})
- Established: 1981

The Calipuy National Reservation is located in La Libertad. Its main purpose is to protect the guanaco’s populations.

== See also ==
- Calipuy National Sanctuary
