= Laborec Highlands =

Mountain range in Slovakia

Coordinates: 49°15′N 21°55′E

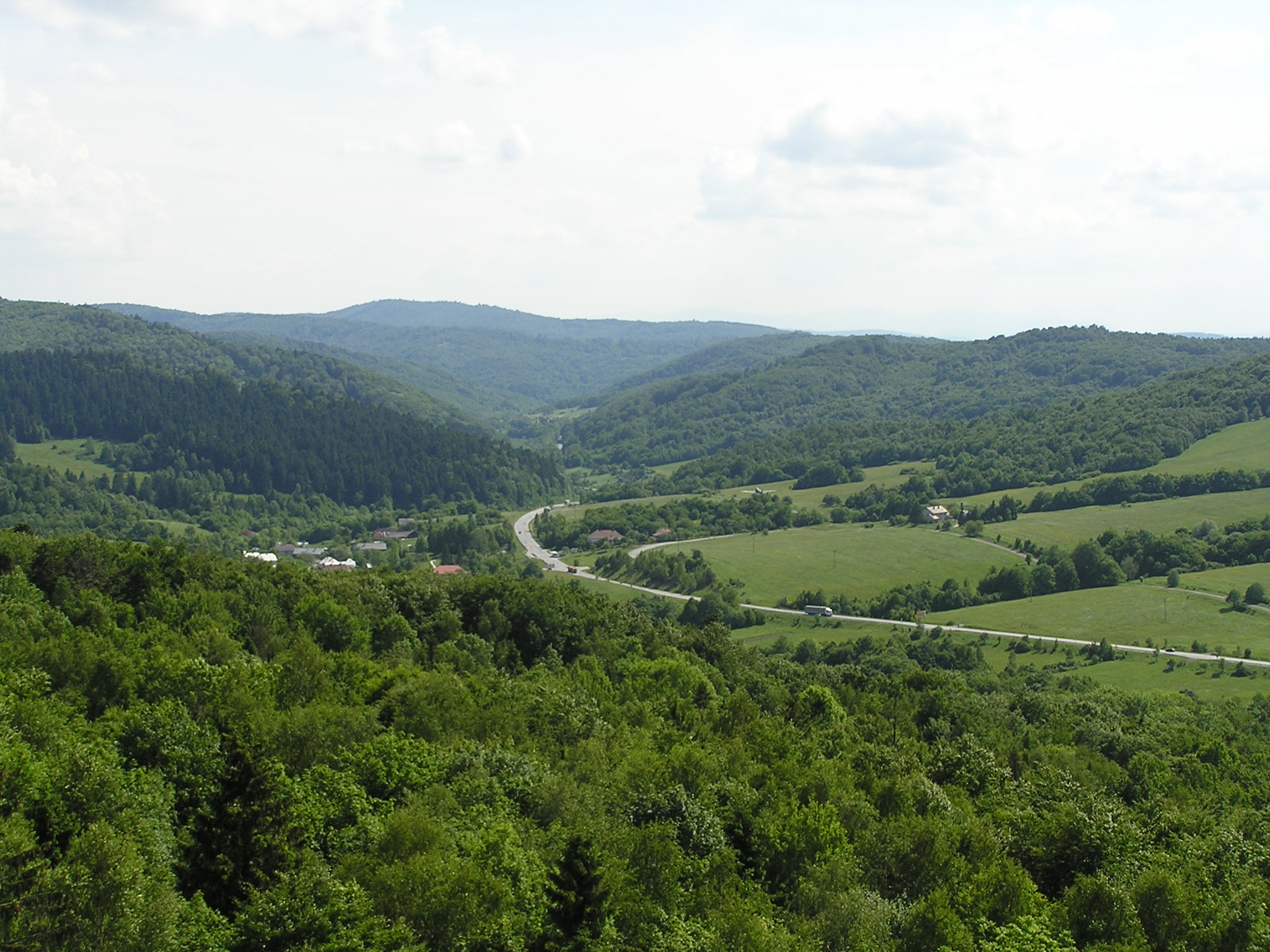
Laborec Highlands, in the region around Vyšný Komárnik

The Laborec Highlands (in Slovak, Laborecká vrchovina) is a mountain range in northeastern Slovakia, part of the Lower Beskids of the Outer Eastern Carpathians.

The range is composed of Carpathian flysch. Bordered in the north by the Polish national border and to the west by the Ondavská Highlands, its ridges typically reach a height of 500 to 700 metres. The highest point is Vysoký Grúň, at 905 metres. The region is drained by the Laborec River and, in its western portion, by the Ondava.

Notables town and villages in the hill country include Medzilaborce (site of the Andy Warhol Museum of Modern Art), Vyšná Jablonka, Bodružal, and Vyšný Komárnik. The highlands are also the location of the strategically significant Dukla Pass, the lowest mountain pass in the main ranges of the Carpathians, and the site of the Battle of the Dukla Pass of September and October 1944.
