= Cachicadán District =

Cachicadán
- District
- Interactive map of Cachicadán
- Country: Peru
- Region: La Libertad
- Province: Santiago de Chuco
- Founded: November 3, 1900
- Capital: Cachicadán

Government
  - Mayor: Rosel Erik Tacanga Lavado

Area
  - Total: 266.5 km^{2} (102.9 sq mi)
- Elevation: 2,884 m (9,462 ft)

Population (2005 census)
  - Total: 6,264
  - Density: 23.50/km^{2} (60.88/sq mi)
- Time zone: UTC-5 (PET)
- UBIGEO: 131003

Cachicadán District is one of eight districts of the province Santiago de Chuco in Peru.

== Climate ==
Climate data for Cachicadán, elevation 2,892 m (9,488 ft), (1991–2020)
Month	Jan	Feb	Mar	Apr	May	Jun	Jul	Aug	Sep	Oct	Nov	Dec	Year
Mean daily maximum °C (°F)	20.7 (69.3)	20.5 (68.9)	19.9 (67.8)	20.7 (69.3)	21.5 (70.7)	22.2 (72.0)	22.5 (72.5)	22.8 (73.0)	22.5 (72.5)	21.5 (70.7)	21.7 (71.1)	21.0 (69.8)	21.5 (70.6)
Mean daily minimum °C (°F)	7.8 (46.0)	8.1 (46.6)	8.2 (46.8)	7.4 (45.3)	6.8 (44.2)	5.9 (42.6)	5.5 (41.9)	5.7 (42.3)	6.5 (43.7)	7.0 (44.6)	6.9 (44.4)	7.6 (45.7)	7.0 (44.5)
Average precipitation mm (inches)	148.7 (5.85)	178.2 (7.02)	219.6 (8.65)	129.3 (5.09)	43.3 (1.70)	14.1 (0.56)	5.6 (0.22)	4.7 (0.19)	26.0 (1.02)	67.0 (2.64)	65.3 (2.57)	130.7 (5.15)	1,032.5 (40.66)
Source: National Meteorology and Hydrology Service of Peru
