= Sitabamba District =

Sitabamba
- District
- Flag
- Interactive map of Sitabamba
- Country: Peru
- Region: La Libertad
- Province: Santiago de Chuco
- Founded: November 3, 1900
- Capital: Sitabamba

Government
  - Mayor: Teudulio Layza Valverde

Area
  - Total: 310.23 km^{2} (119.78 sq mi)
- Elevation: 3,063 m (10,049 ft)

Population (2005 census)
  - Total: 3,610
  - Density: 11.6/km^{2} (30.1/sq mi)
- Time zone: UTC-5 (PET)
- UBIGEO: 131008

Sitabamba District is one of eight districts of the province Santiago de Chuco in Peru.
