= Mollebamba District =

Mollebamba Mullipampa
- District
- Interactive map of Mollebamba
- Country: Peru
- Region: La Libertad
- Province: Santiago de Chuco
- Founded: August 3, 1920
- Capital: Mollebamba

Government
  - Mayor: Fortunato Wilmer Sanchez Paredes

Area
  - Total: 69.69 km^{2} (26.91 sq mi)
- Elevation: 3,054 m (10,020 ft)

Population (2005 census)
  - Total: 2,060
  - Density: 29.6/km^{2} (76.6/sq mi)
- Time zone: UTC-5 (PET)
- UBIGEO: 131004

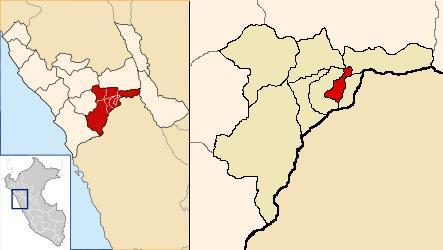
Location of Mollebamba in Santiago de Chuco

Mollebamba or Mullipampa (Quechua mulli Peruvian pepper tree pampa a large plain, "pepper tree plain") is one of eight districts of the province Santiago de Chuco in Peru.
