= Vyšný Komárnik =

- Municipality
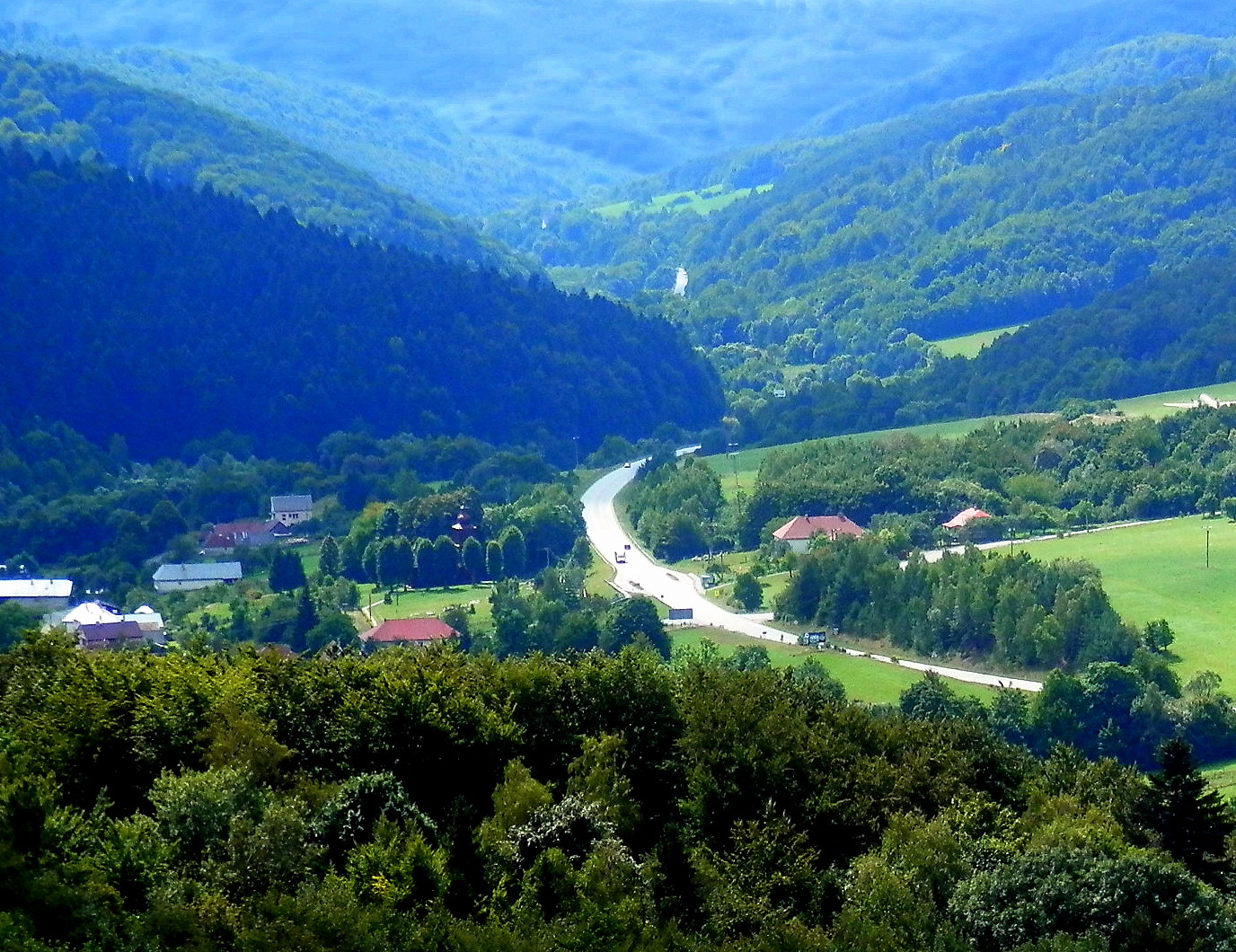

- Flag Coat of arms

- Location of Vyšný Komárnik in the Prešov Region Location of Vyšný Komárnik in Slovakia
- Coordinates: 49.40°N 21.72°E
- Country: Slovakia
- Region: Prešov Region
- District: Svidník District
- First mentioned: 1600

Area
  - Total: 6.60 km^{2} (2.55 sq mi)
- Elevation: 434 m (1,424 ft)

Population (2025)
  - Total: 67
- Time zone: UTC+1 (CET)
  - Summer (DST): UTC+2 (CEST)
- Postal code: 900 5
- Area code: +421 54
- Vehicle registration plate (until 2022): SK
- Website: www.vysnykomarnik.dcom.sk

Vyšný Komárnik is a village and municipality in Svidník District in the Prešov Region of north-eastern Slovakia, in the Laborec Highlands.

== History ==
In historical records the village was first mentioned in 1600.

During World War II, Vyšný Komárnik was the first liberated village on the territory of (then) Czechoslovakia.

In 1949, the Czechoslovak government erected a memorial and cemetery southeast of the Dukla border crossing, It contains the graves of several hundred Russian and Czechoslovak soldiers. Several other memorials and cemeteries have also been erected in the region.

== Geography ==
The municipality lies at an altitude of 434 metres (1,424 ft) and covers an area of 6.60 km^{2} (2.55 sq mi) (2025).

== Population ==
Population statistic (10 years)
Year	1995	2005	2015	2025
Count	72	73	69	67
Difference		+1.38%	−5.47%	−2.89%

Population statistic
Year	2024	2025
Count	64	67
Difference		+4.68%

It has a population of 67 people (31 December 2025).

=== Ethnicity ===
Census 2021 (1+ %)
Ethnicity	Number	Fraction
Slovak	69	86.25%
Rusyn	27	33.75%
Romani	10	12.5%
Jewish	2	2.5%
Ukrainian	1	1.25%
Not found out	1	1.25%
Total	80	

In year 2021 was 80 people by ethnicity 69 as Slovak, 27 as Rusyn, 10 as Romani, 2 as Jewish, 1 as Ukrainian and 1 as Not found out.

Note on population: The difference values of population numbers in the table "Population statistic" and in the sections "Ethnicity" & "Religion" is caused by the use of various statistical methods.

=== Religion ===
Census 2021 (1+ %)
Religion	Number	Fraction
Greek Catholic Church	59	73.75%
Roman Catholic Church	8	10%
Eastern Orthodox Church	6	7.5%
Evangelical Church	3	3.75%
None	2	2.5%
Not found out	1	1.25%
Ad hoc movements	1	1.25%
Total	80	

In year 2021 was 80 people by religion 59 from Greek Catholic Church, 8 from Roman Catholic Church, 6 from Eastern Orthodox Church, 3 from Evangelical Church, 2 from None, 1 from Not found out and 1 from Ad hoc movements.
