= Santiago de Chuco District =

Santiago de Chuco
- District
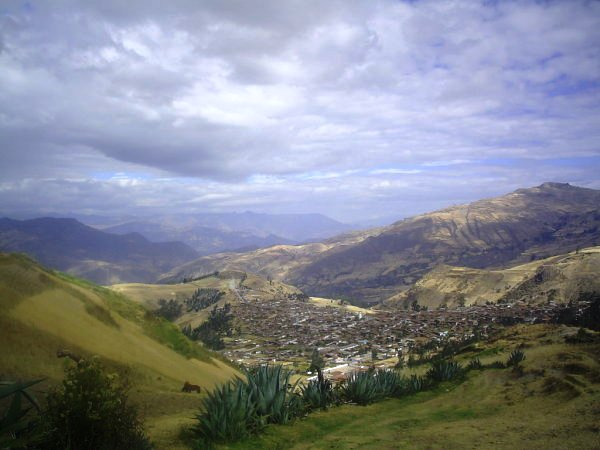
- Santiago de Chuco
- Interactive map of Santiago de Chuco
- Country: Peru
- Region: La Libertad
- Province: Santiago de Chuco
- Capital: Santiago de Chuco

Government
  - Mayor: Abner José Avalos Villacorta

Area
  - Total: 1,073.63 km^{2} (414.53 sq mi)
- Elevation: 3,099 m (10,167 ft)

Population (2005 census)
  - Total: 21,190
  - Density: 19.74/km^{2} (51.12/sq mi)
- Time zone: UTC-5 (PET)
- UBIGEO: 131001

Santiago de Chuco District is one of eight districts of the province Santiago de Chuco in Peru.
