= Quiruvilca District =

Quiruvilca Qiruwillka
- District
- Location within Peru
- Coordinates: 8°S 78.31°W
- Country: Peru
- Region: La Libertad
- Province: Santiago de Chuco
- Founded: November 13, 1916
- Capital: Quiruvilca

Government
  - Mayor: Walter Josue Diaz Ramos

Area
  - Total: 549.14 km^{2} (212.02 sq mi)
- Elevation: 4,008 m (13,150 ft)

Population (2005 census)
  - Total: 13,031
  - Density: 23.730/km^{2} (61.460/sq mi)
- Time zone: UTC-5 (PET)
- UBIGEO: 131006

Quiruvilca or Qiruwillka (Quechua) is one of eight districts of the province Santiago de Chuco in Peru.
