= Bodružal =

- Municipality
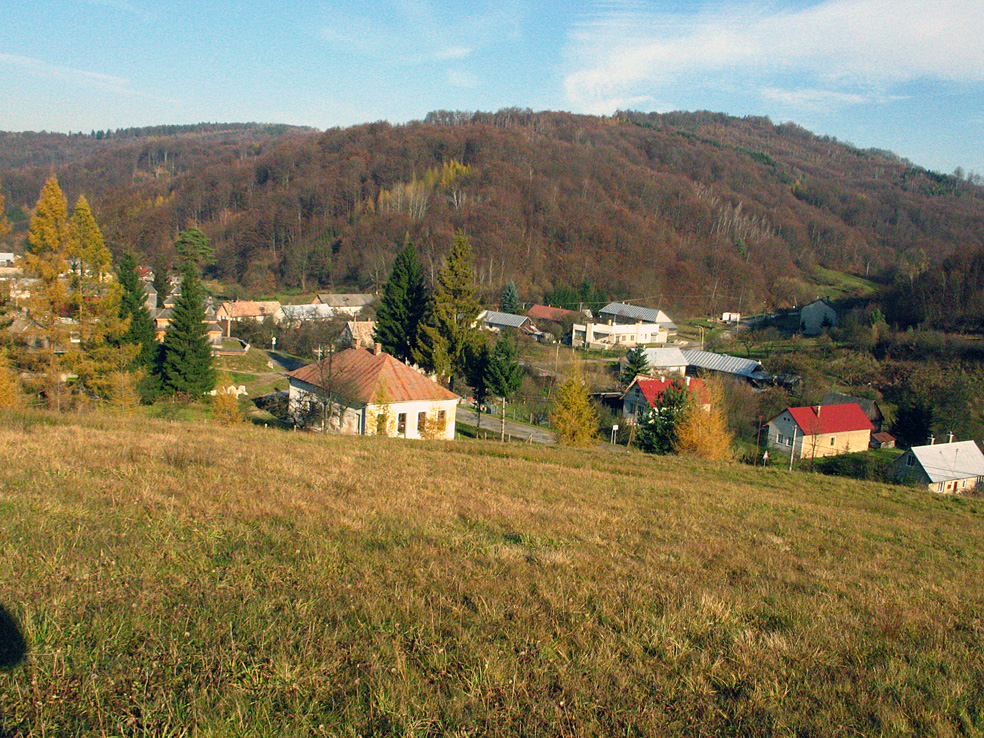

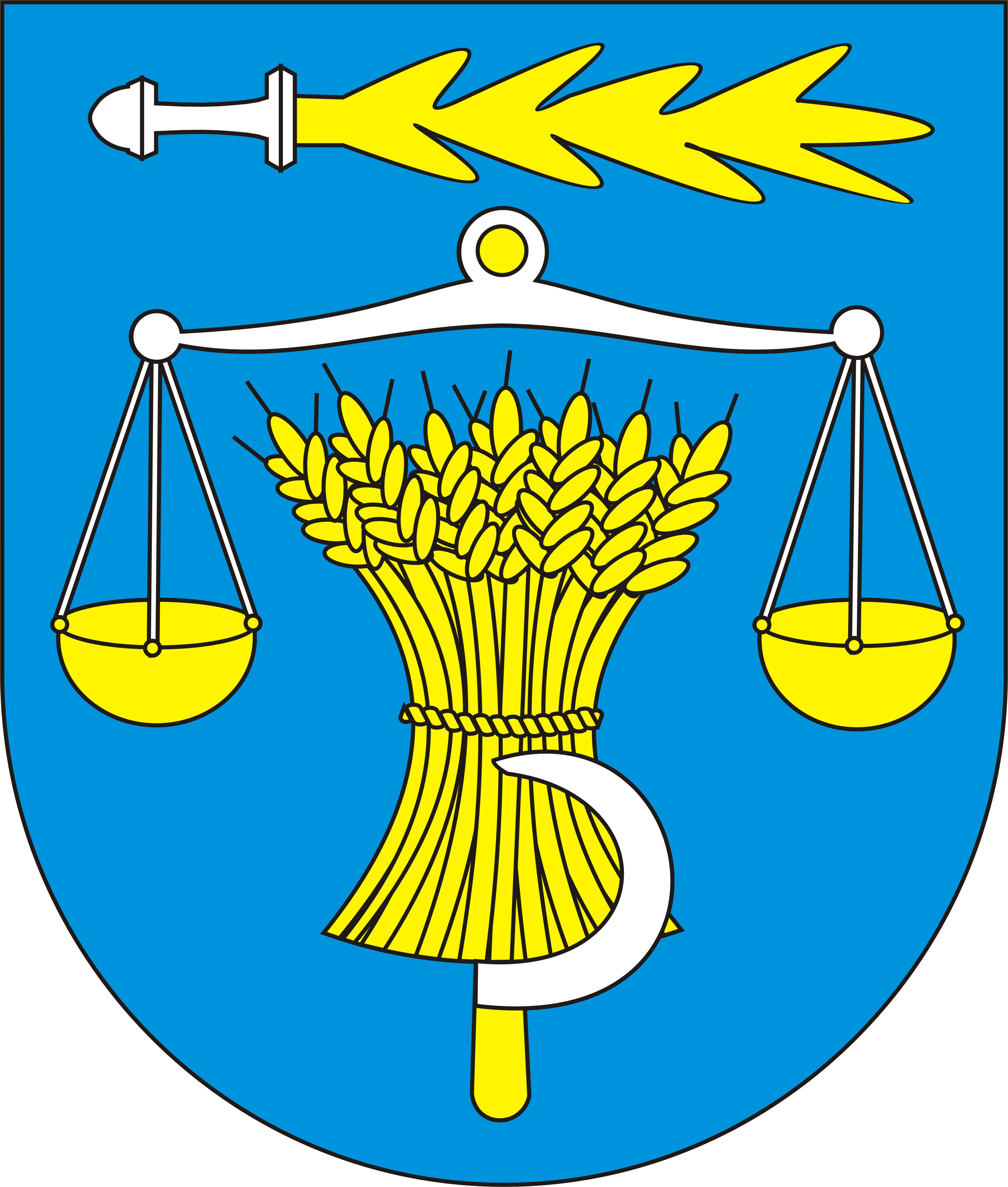
- Flag Coat of arms

- Location of Bodružal in the Prešov Region Location of Bodružal in Slovakia
- Coordinates: 49.35°N 21.70°E
- Country: Slovakia
- Region: Prešov Region
- District: Svidník District
- First mentioned: 1600

Area
  - Total: 7.23 km^{2} (2.79 sq mi)
- Elevation: 359 m (1,178 ft)

Population (2025)
  - Total: 57
- Time zone: UTC+1 (CET)
  - Summer (DST): UTC+2 (CEST)
- Postal code: 900 5
- Area code: +421 54
- Vehicle registration plate (until 2022): SK

Bodružal (1927–1973: Bodružaľ; Rusyn: Бодруджал; Hungarian: Rózsadomb, until 1899: Bodruzsal) is a municipality (village) in Slovakia in the Svidník District in Prešov Region, within the Laborec Highlands.

The village, first mentioned in writing in 1600, is best known for housing a baroque wooden church being a national cultural monument in Slovakia.

== Geography ==
The municipality lies at an altitude of 359 metres (1,178 ft) and covers an area of 7.23 km^{2} (2.79 sq mi) (2025).

== Population ==
Population statistic (10 years)
Year	1995	2005	2015	2025
Count	77	63	69	57
Difference		−18.18%	+9.52%	−17.39%

Population statistic
Year	2024	2025
Count	59	57
Difference		−3.38%

It has a population of 57 people (31 December 2025).

=== Ethnicity ===
Census 2021 (1+ %)
Ethnicity	Number	Fraction
Slovak	48	80%
Rusyn	25	41.66%
Not found out	5	8.33%
Romani	3	5%
Russian	1	1.66%
Polish	1	1.66%
Total	60	

In year 2021 was 60 people by ethnicity 48 as Slovak, 25 as Rusyn, 5 as Not found out, 3 as Romani, 1 as Russian and 1 as Polish.

Note on population: The difference values of population numbers in the table "Population statistic" and in the sections "Ethnicity" & "Religion" is caused by the use of various statistical methods.

=== Religion ===
Census 2021 (1+ %)
Religion	Number	Fraction
Greek Catholic Church	34	56.67%
Eastern Orthodox Church	10	16.67%
None	7	11.67%
Not found out	4	6.67%
Church of the Brethren	2	3.33%
Apostolic Church	2	3.33%
Roman Catholic Church	1	1.67%
Total	60	

In year 2021 was 60 people by religion 34 from Greek Catholic Church, 10 from Eastern Orthodox Church, 7 from None, 4 from Not found out, 2 from Church of the Brethren, 2 from Apostolic Church and 1 from Roman Catholic Church.

== Genealogical resources ==
The records for genealogical research are available at the state archive "Statny Archiv in Presov, Slovakia"

- Greek Catholic church records (births/marriages/deaths): 1823-1922 (parish A)
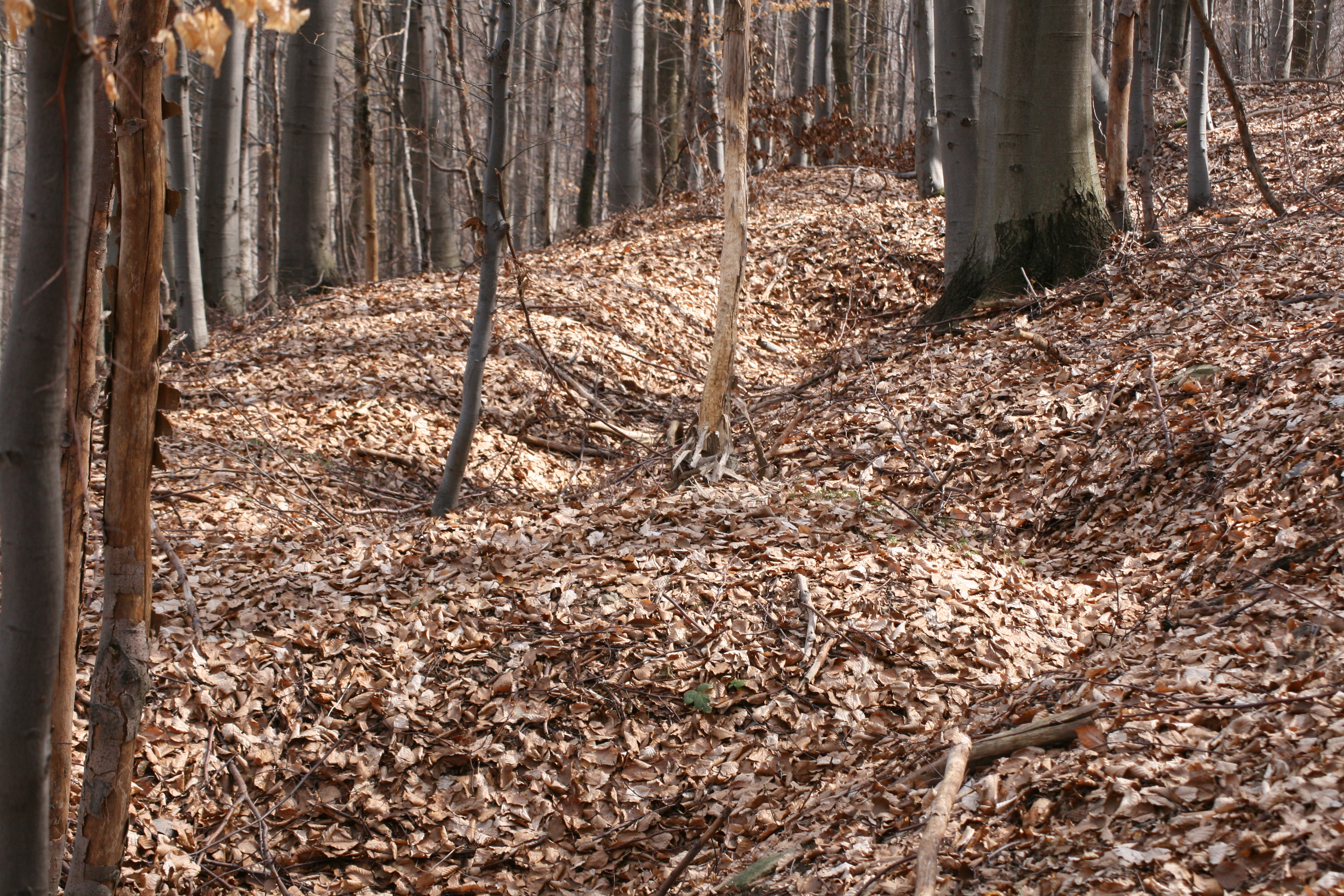
World War I Trench remains in the forest near Bodružal

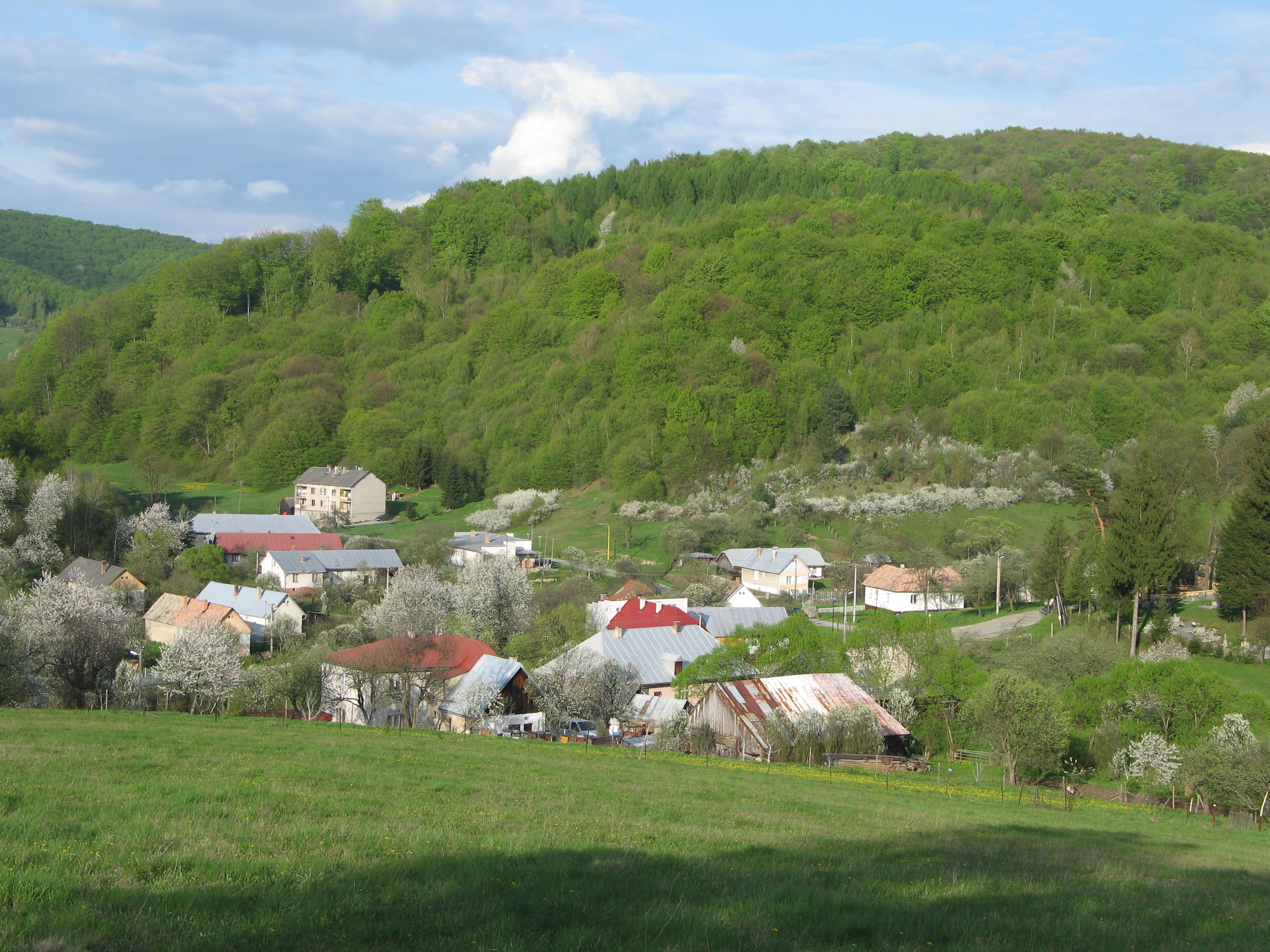
Bodružal in summer

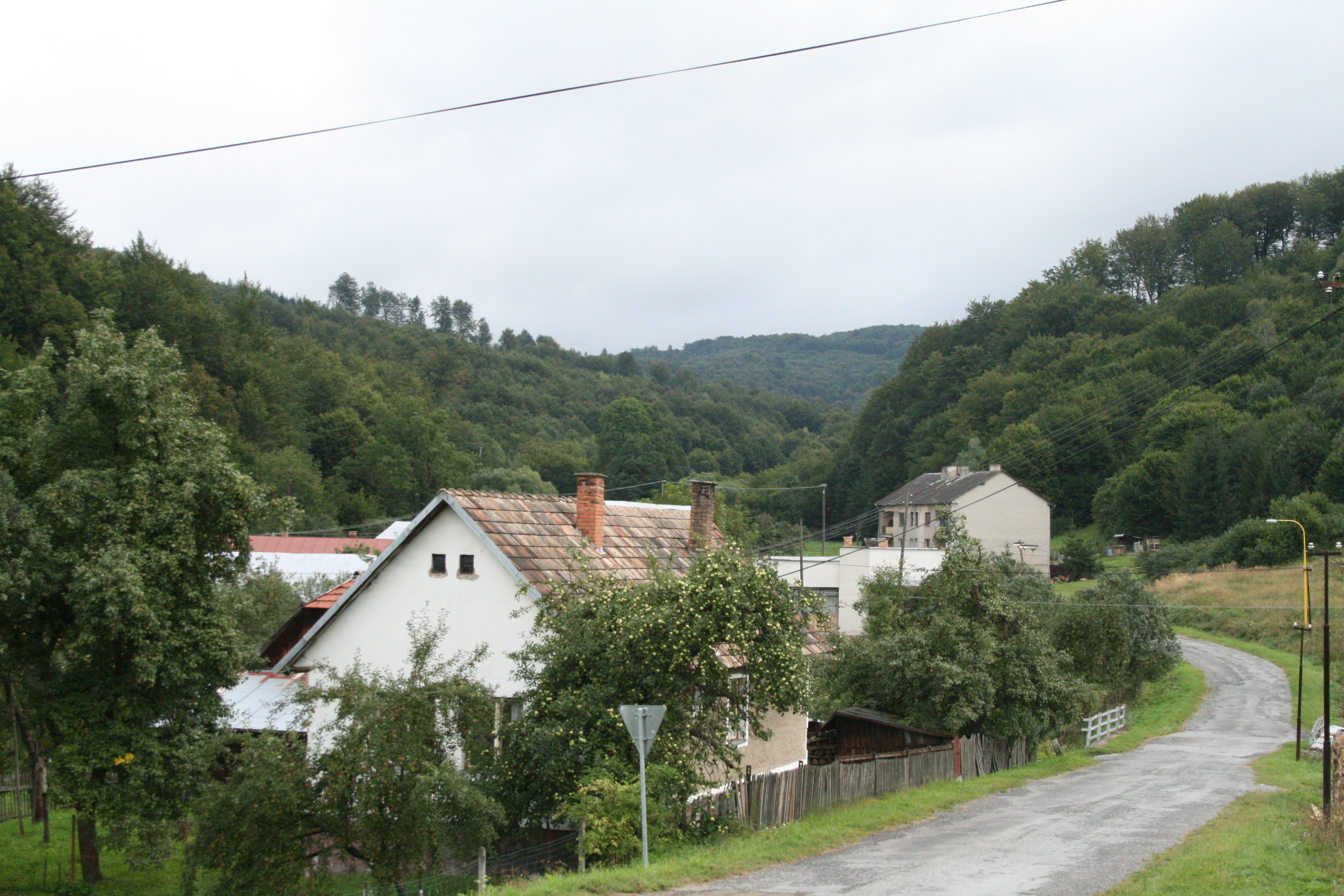
Bodružal in the Carpathians

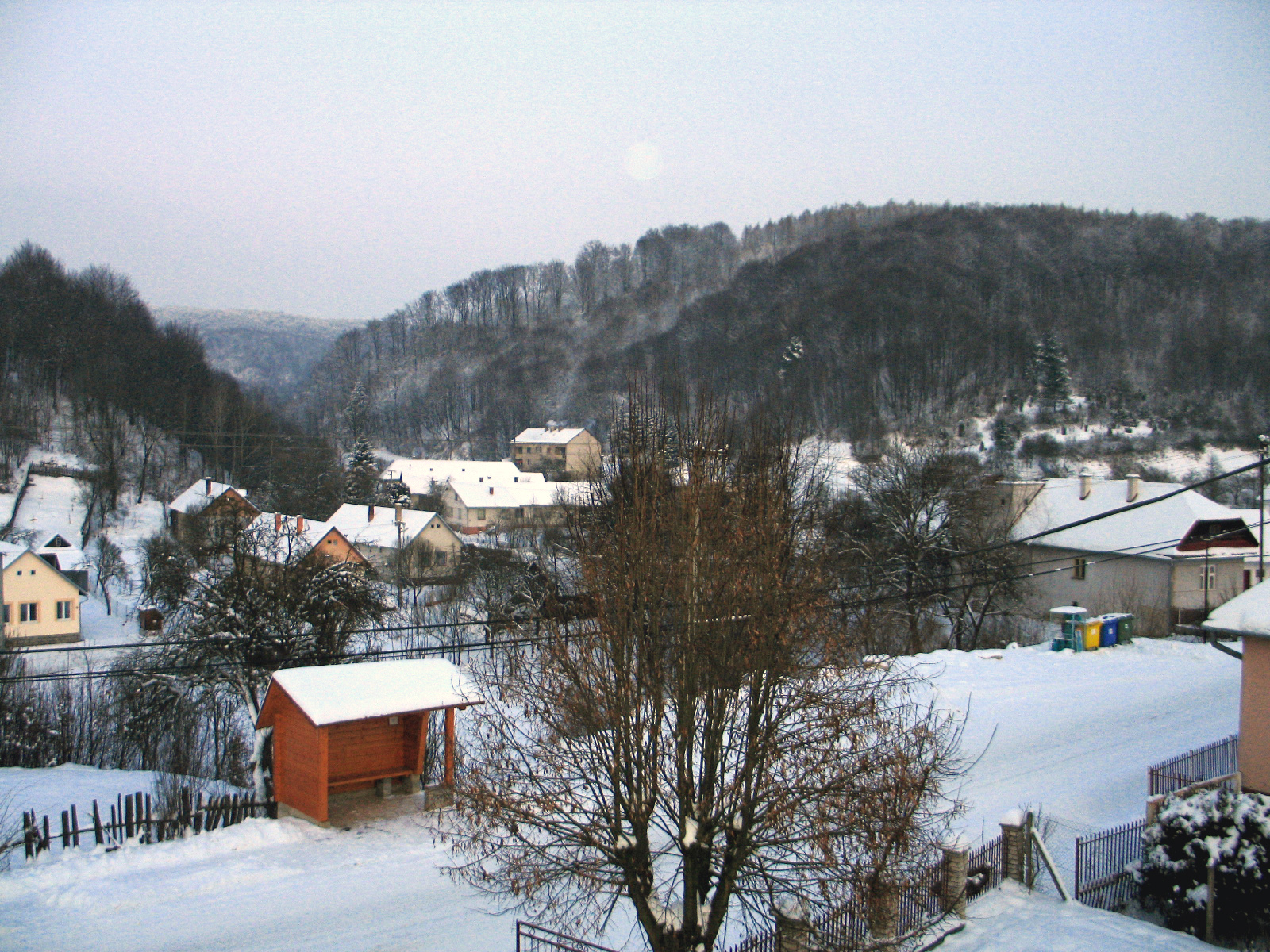
Bodružal in winter

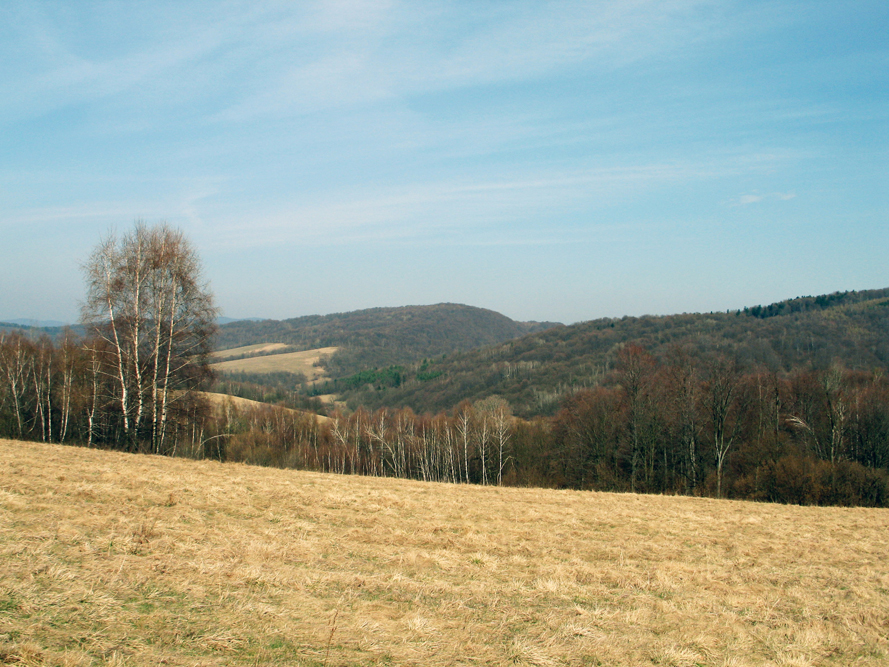
Bodružal in spring

== Saint Nicholas Church (Bodružal) ==
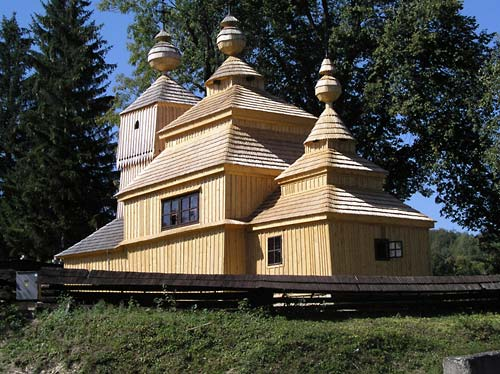
The historic Church of St. Nicholas in Bodružal. The church has been reconstructed with the assistance of the U.S. Commission for the Preservation of America’s Heritage Abroad, and was blessed on September 18, 2003 by Bishop Ján Babjak of Prešov.

St. Nicholas Church is a wooden Greek Catholic Church of the Eastern Rite situated in a village Bodružal in Svidník district in the Prešov Region. It is registered on the UNESCO's World Heritage List under an identification number 1273-007 since 8 July 2008.

The church is part of a unique urban entity situated on an elevated place in the village centre. Apart from the church hall, there's a separate bell tower, an adjacent cemetery and a wooden enclosure with a shingle roof and an entrance gate covered by a conical and an onion shape roof.

The church itself is a prototype church of the so-called Lemko type. It dates back to 1658 and belongs to the oldest wooden sacral buildings of the Eastern Rites in Slovakia.

The church has three towers. The construction is made out of logs, in a shape of three squares arranged on the same axis oriented from east to west. The exterior is decorated with vertically laid planks. The logs were also used on the construction of imitation tiered corbelled arches (of a truncated pyramid) in the sanctum and the nave. The arrangement of individual parts of the church represents the Holy Trinity. The church is situated on the highest hillock of the village. With its location it is higher than the rest of the buildings and houses.

The roof is made out of shingles. The tent roof above the presbytery and the nave is finished with a short square structure, to which conical bodies are attached to. To them baroque onion-like little roofs are fixed, finished with small shingle conical heads set with wrought iron crosses.

== See also ==
- List of municipalities and towns in Slovakia
