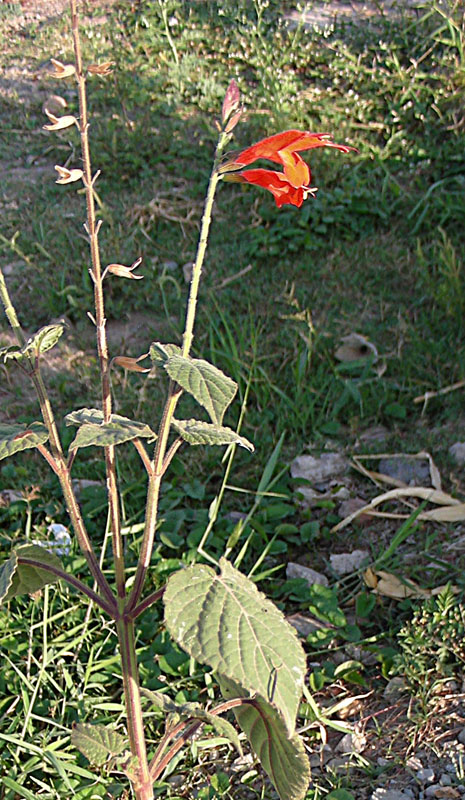

Scientific classification
- Kingdom: Plantae
- Clade: Tracheophytes
- Clade: Angiosperms
- Clade: Eudicots
- Clade: Asterids
- Order: Lamiales
- Family: Lamiaceae
- Genus: Salvia
- Species: S. oppositiflora

Binomial name
- Salvia oppositiflora Ruiz & Pav.

Synonyms
- Codanthera glabra Raf.; Salvia cupheifolia Kunth; Salvia grata Vahl; Salvia strictiflora Hook.

= Salvia oppositiflora =

Species of plant

Salvia oppositiflora is a species of perennial flowering plant in the family Lamiaceae. It is native to Peru, growing at high elevations—7,000 to 12,000 feet. It was collected in 1798 by Hipólito Ruiz López and José Antonio Pavón Jiménez and later described in Flora of Peru.

Salvia oppositiflora reaches 2–3 feet in height and width, with a floppy habit. The mid-green leaves are ovate, nearly triangular, reaching up to 1.5 inches long and wide, smooth or lightly covered with hairs, and with serrated edges. The 1 inch flowers are orange-red, appearing tube-like, with reddish stamens protruding from the lower lip. The inflorescences are short, with flowers growing in opposite pairs, giving the plant its name. The lime-green calyces, and the plant's stems, are covered with short hairs and glands.
