= Angasmarca District =

Angasmarca Anqasmarka
- District
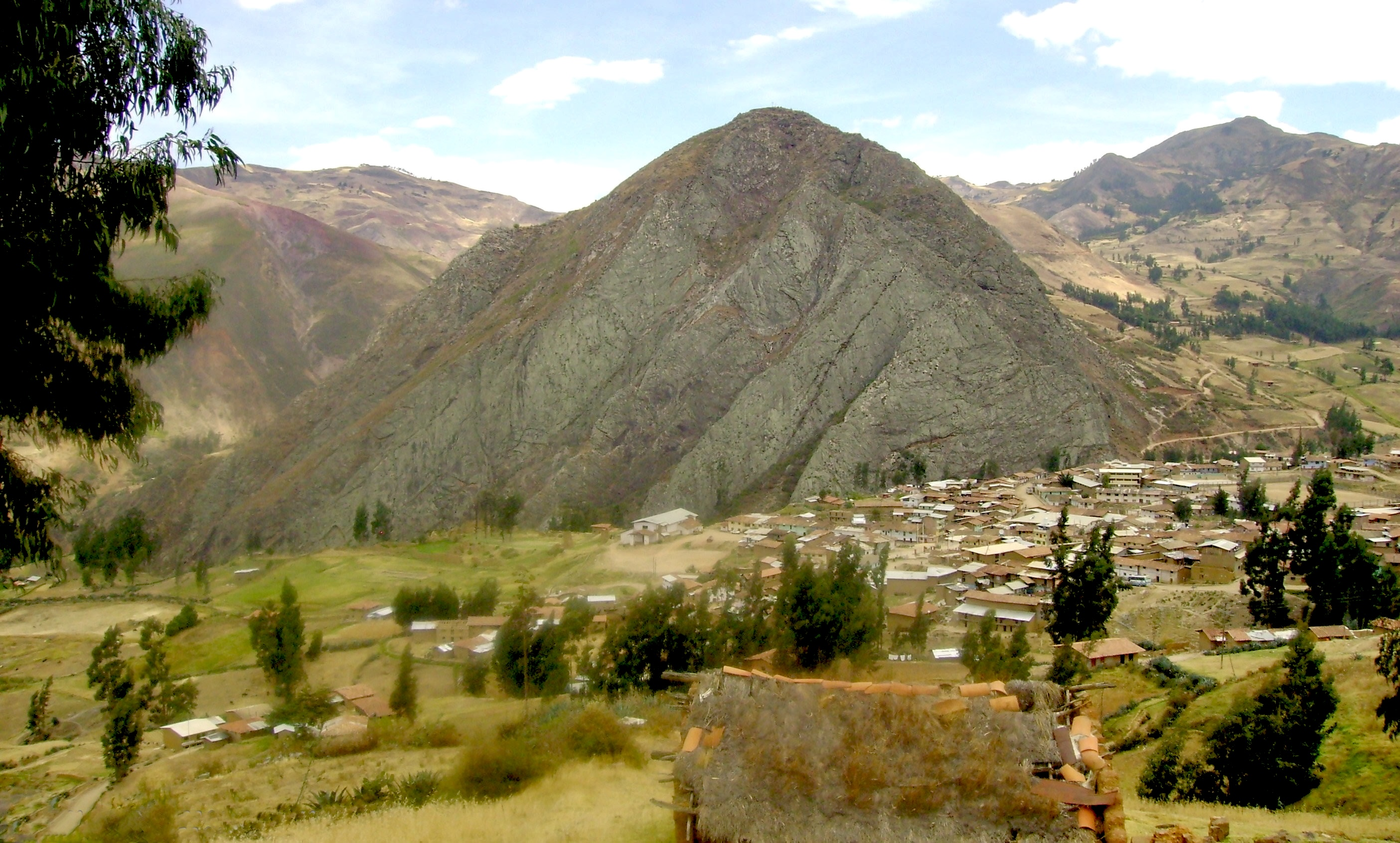
- Interactive map of Angasmarca
- Coordinates: 8°08′S 78°04′W
- Country: Peru
- Region: La Libertad
- Province: Santiago de Chuco
- Founded: September 21, 1985
- Capital: Angasmarca

Government
  - Mayor: Diogenes Santiago Geldres Velasquez

Area
  - Total: 153.45 km^{2} (59.25 sq mi)
- Elevation: 2,900 m (9,500 ft)

Population (2005 census)
  - Total: 5,042
  - Density: 32.86/km^{2} (85.10/sq mi)
- Time zone: UTC-5 (PET)
- UBIGEO: 131002

Angasmarca or Anqasmarka (Quechua anqas blue, marka village, "blue village") is one of eight districts of the province Santiago de Chuco in Peru.
