= Túrony =

- Village (Falva)
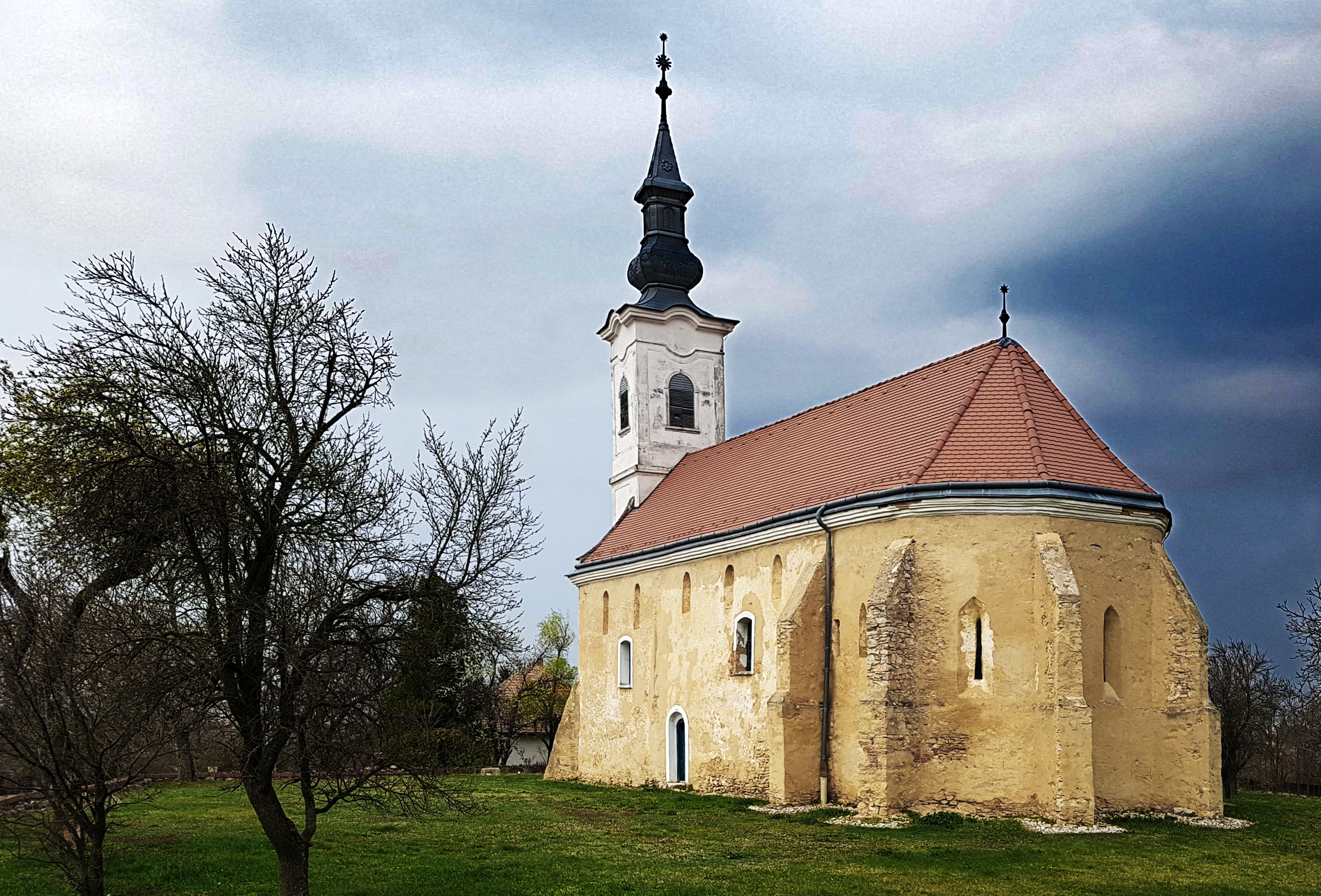

- Location of Baranya county in Hungary

- Location of Túrony
- Coordinates: 45.90839°N 18.22915°E
- Country: Hungary
- County: Baranya

Area
  - Total: 9.4 km^{2} (3.6 sq mi)

Population (2004)
  - Total: 267
  - Density: 28.4/km^{2} (74/sq mi)
- Time zone: UTC+1 (CET)
  - Summer (DST): UTC+2 (CEST)
- Postal code: 7811
- Area code: 72

Túrony (Croatian: Turon) is a village in Baranya county, Hungary.
