= Santiago de Chuco =

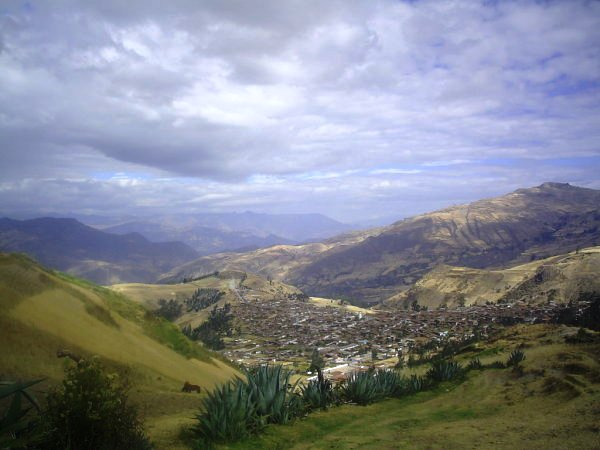
- Panoramic view of the city of Santiago de Chuco

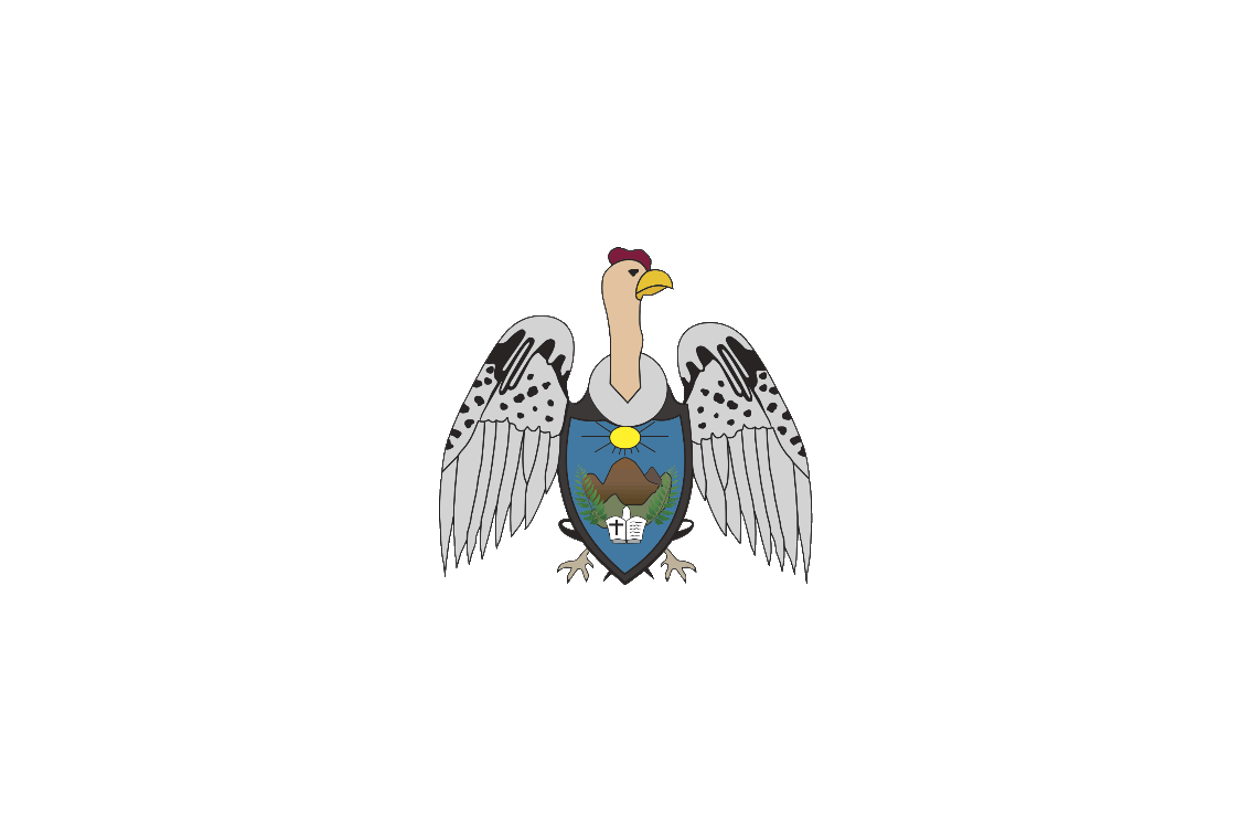
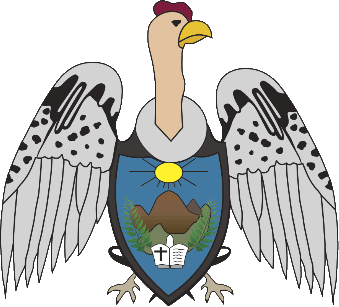
- Flag Seal

- Location within Peru
- Coordinates: 8°9′0.78″S 78°10′41.95″W
- Country: Peru
- Region: La Libertad Region
- Province: Santiago de Chuco

Government
  - Mayor: Juan Gabriel Alipio
- Elevation: 3,120 m (10,240 ft)

Population (2005)
  - Urban: 25 000
  - Demonym: Santiaguino(a)
- Time zone: UTC-5 (PET)
- Website: Municipality

Santiago de Chuco is a city in Peru, capital of Santiago de Chuco Province, La Libertad Region.

== History ==
On July 23, 1553 it was obtained permission to found a town that served as the capital and hub of mining and wheat. Captain Don Diego de la Serna, immigrants Domingo Perez Vasquez, Jose Pelaez, Lino Benítes of Children, Miguel de Estremadura, Rodrigo of Bejarano, Fernando de Alva, Garcia de Paredes, Lorenzo de Alcantara, Juan Baptist father Ruiz and Francisco de Asis Centurion reached Andaymarca, a native of Santiago de Compostela, who helped Santiago the "greatest" be the tutelary patron of the new town.

== Notable people ==
- César Vallejo
- Luis de la Puente Uceda
- Pablo Uceda
- Eladio Ruiz Cerna

== Climate ==
Climate data for Santiago de Chuco, elevation 3,115 m (10,220 ft)
Month	Jan	Feb	Mar	Apr	May	Jun	Jul	Aug	Sep	Oct	Nov	Dec	Year
Mean daily maximum °C (°F)	19.7 (67.5)	18.8 (65.8)	18.2 (64.8)	18.6 (65.5)	20.0 (68.0)	20.3 (68.5)	20.5 (68.9)	20.7 (69.3)	21.4 (70.5)	20.3 (68.5)	20.9 (69.6)	20.1 (68.2)	20.0 (67.9)
Mean daily minimum °C (°F)	7.7 (45.9)	8.4 (47.1)	8.0 (46.4)	8.0 (46.4)	7.4 (45.3)	7.0 (44.6)	6.5 (43.7)	7.3 (45.1)	7.3 (45.1)	7.9 (46.2)	8.2 (46.8)	7.8 (46.0)	7.6 (45.7)
Average precipitation mm (inches)	97.1 (3.82)	121.3 (4.78)	124.2 (4.89)	79.9 (3.15)	20.6 (0.81)	6.5 (0.26)	5.6 (0.22)	4.0 (0.16)	2.4 (0.09)	35.6 (1.40)	17.3 (0.68)	31.5 (1.24)	546 (21.5)
Source: Sistema Nacional de Información Ambiental

== See also ==
- La Libertad Region
