= Saipina =

Coordinates: 18.0944°S 64.5833°W

- Town
- Interactive map of Saipina
- Country: Bolivia
- Department: Santa Cruz Department
- Province: Manuel María Caballero Province
- Municipality: Saipina Municipality

Population (2001)
  - Total: 2,394
- Time zone: UTC-4 (BOT)

Saipina is a small town in the Santa Cruz Department in Bolivia. It is the seat of the Saipina Municipality, the second municipal section of the Manuel María Caballero Province. At the time of census 2001 it had 2,394 inhabitants.
