= Santiago de Chuco province =

Coordinates: 8°08′44″S 78°10′31″W

Santiago de Chuco
- Province
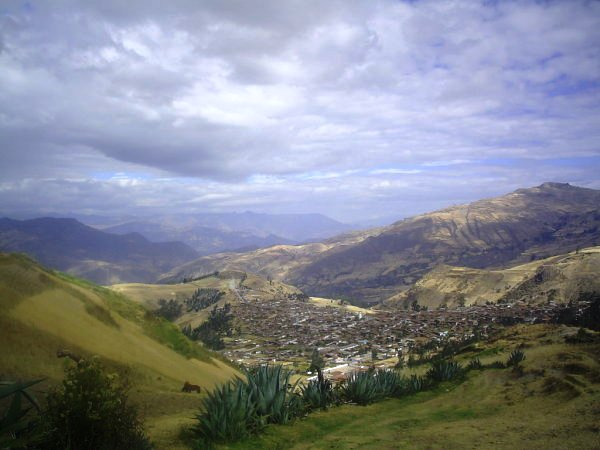

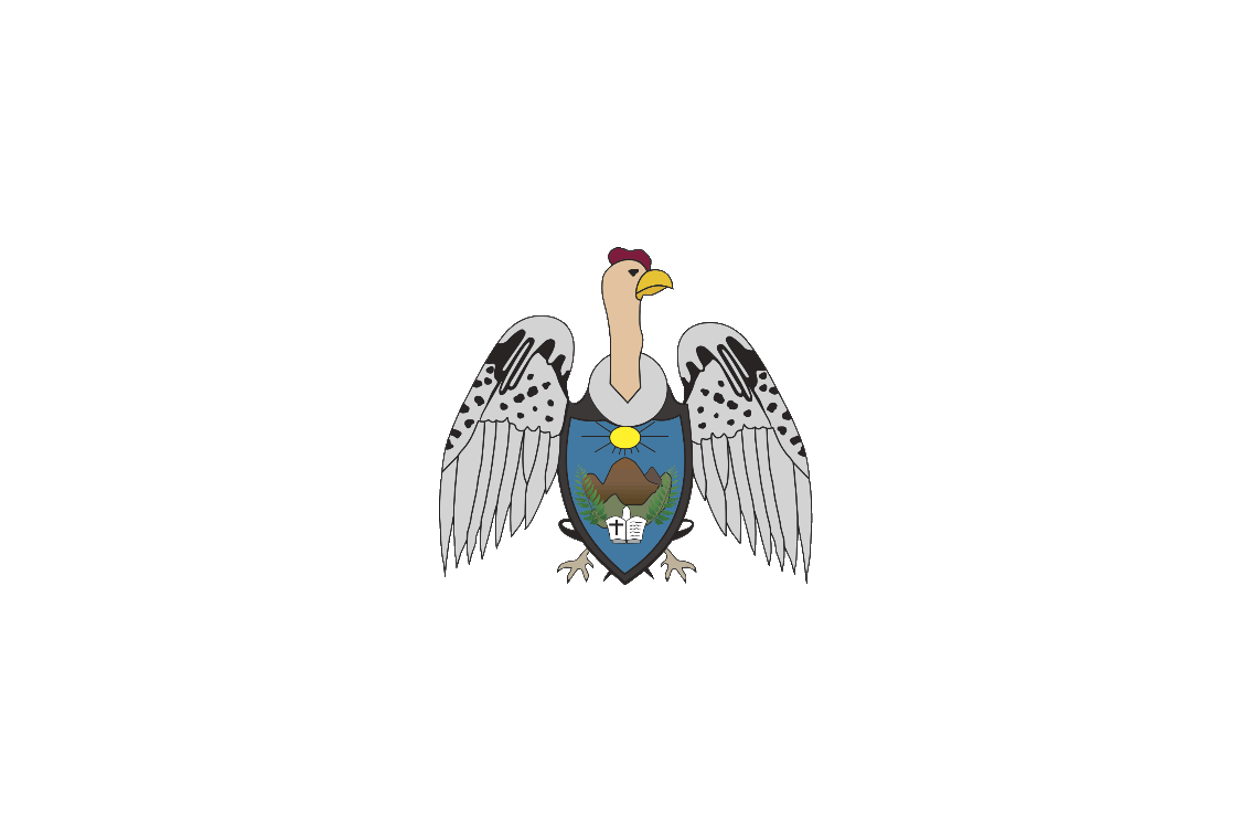
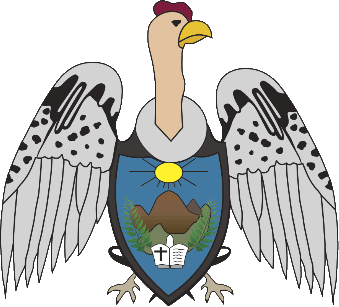
- Flag Coat of arms

- Location of Santiago de Chuco in La Libertad Region
- Country: Peru
- Region: La Libertad
- Founded: November 3, 1900
- Capital: Santiago de Chuco

Area
  - Total: 2,658.96 km^{2} (1,026.63 sq mi)

Population (2005 census)
  - Total: 57,526
  - Density: 21.635/km^{2} (56.034/sq mi)
- UBIGEO: 1310

Santiago de Chuco is one of twelve provinces of the La Libertad Region in Peru. The capital of this province is the city of Santiago de Chuco.

== Political division ==
The province is divided into eight districts, which are:

- Angasmarca
- Cachicadán
- Mollebamba
- Mollepata
- Quiruvilca
- Santa Cruz de Chuca
- Santiago de Chuco
- Sitabamba

== History ==
On July 23, 1610, a group of immigrants were allowed to found a village, which would serve as capital city and as headquarters for both mining and related wheat sowing activities. Among Santiago de Chuco's "Founding Fathers", who arrived first in Andaymarca, we find Captain Don Diego de la Serna, immigrants Domingo Pérez de Vásquéz, José de Pelaez, Lino Benítes de los Niños, Miguel de Estremadura, Rodrigo de los Bejarano, Fernando de Alva, García de Paredes, Lorenzo de Alcántara, Juan Bautista de Ruiz and the priest Francisco de Asís Centurión, who was born in Santiago de Compostela. Father de Asís Centurión was he who got "Santiago, El Mayor" to become the main saint of the town.

On July 25, 1610, in front of an altar which was set in a place named "Picchi-Paccha", a mass of thanksgiving was celebrated;the "Foundation First Stone" was then placed. The distribution of lands for house building took place and the architectural design of the city and church were outlined. The City Church would later be inaugurated on July 25, 1616. In this same year, the town was given its current and definitive name, Santiago de Chuco, by the Peruvian government.

In 1863, the congressman for Huamachuco, Don Manuel Natividad Porras, filed a bill for Provincial Status for Santiago de Chuco District. The Bill failed to be enacted at that time due to the sudden death of Don Manuel Natividad Porras. On November 3, 1900, through support of congressman Tomás Ganoza Cavero (who carried on with Manuel Porras's work), President Eduardo López de Romaña passed the bill which granted Provincial Status to the Santiago de Chuco District.

== Places of interest ==
- Calipuy National Sanctuary
- The town school building has within its covered entranceway a bronze bust of César Vallejo similar to that pictured in the Wikipedia (both Spanish and English) articles César Vallejo.

== See also ==
- Lakes El Toro
- La Libertad Region
