= Pampa Grande =

Archaeological site in Peru

- Pampagrande; Huaca Fortaleza
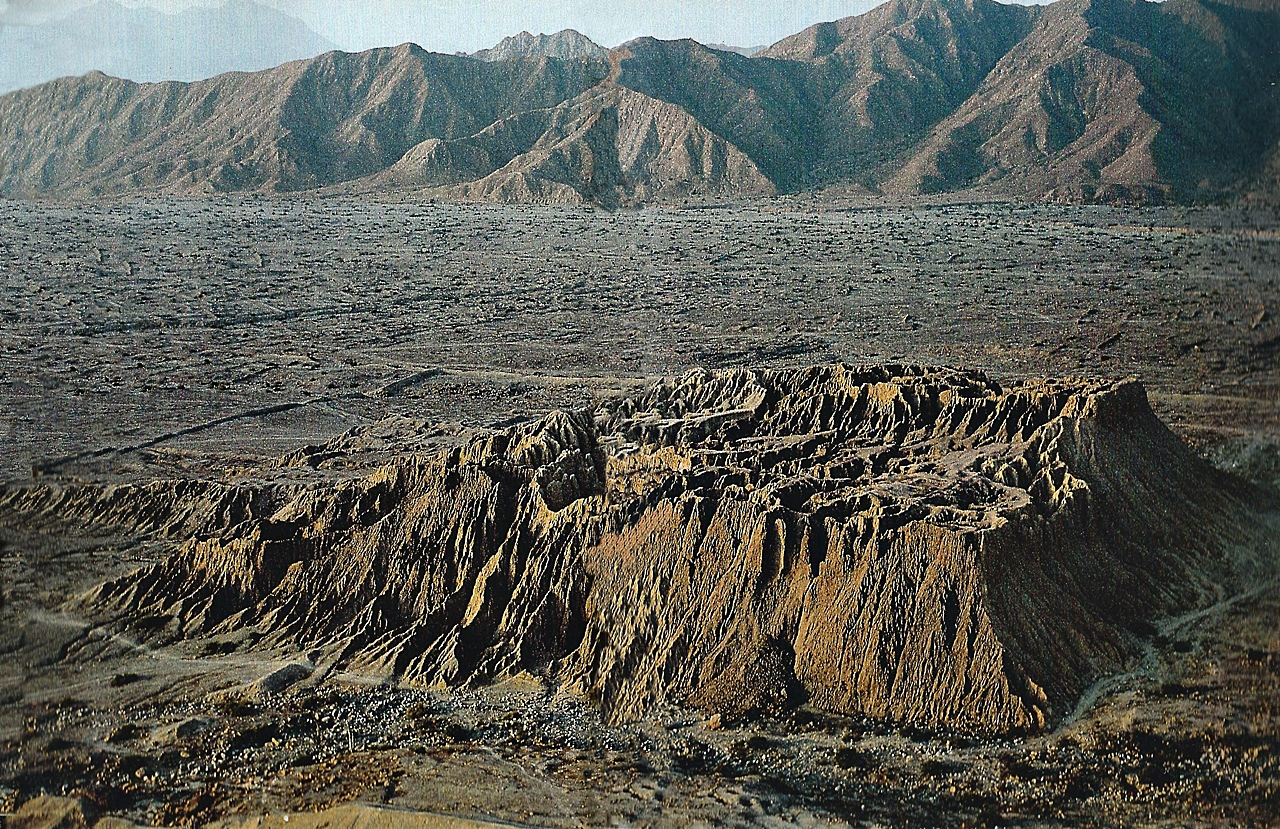

- Location within Peru Location within South America
- Interactive map of Pampa Grande
- 6.7627°S 79.4742°W
- Type: Settlement
- Periods: Early Intermediate
- Cultures: Moche
- Location: Chongoyape District, Chiclayo Province, Lambayeque Region, Peru
- Region: Lambayeque valley (North of Peru)

History
- Built: c. 600
- Built by: Moche culture
- Abandoned: c. 750

Site notes
- Material: Adobe
- Elevation: 145 m (476 ft)
- Area: 600 ha (1,500 acres)
- Owner: Peruvian Government
- Public access: Yes

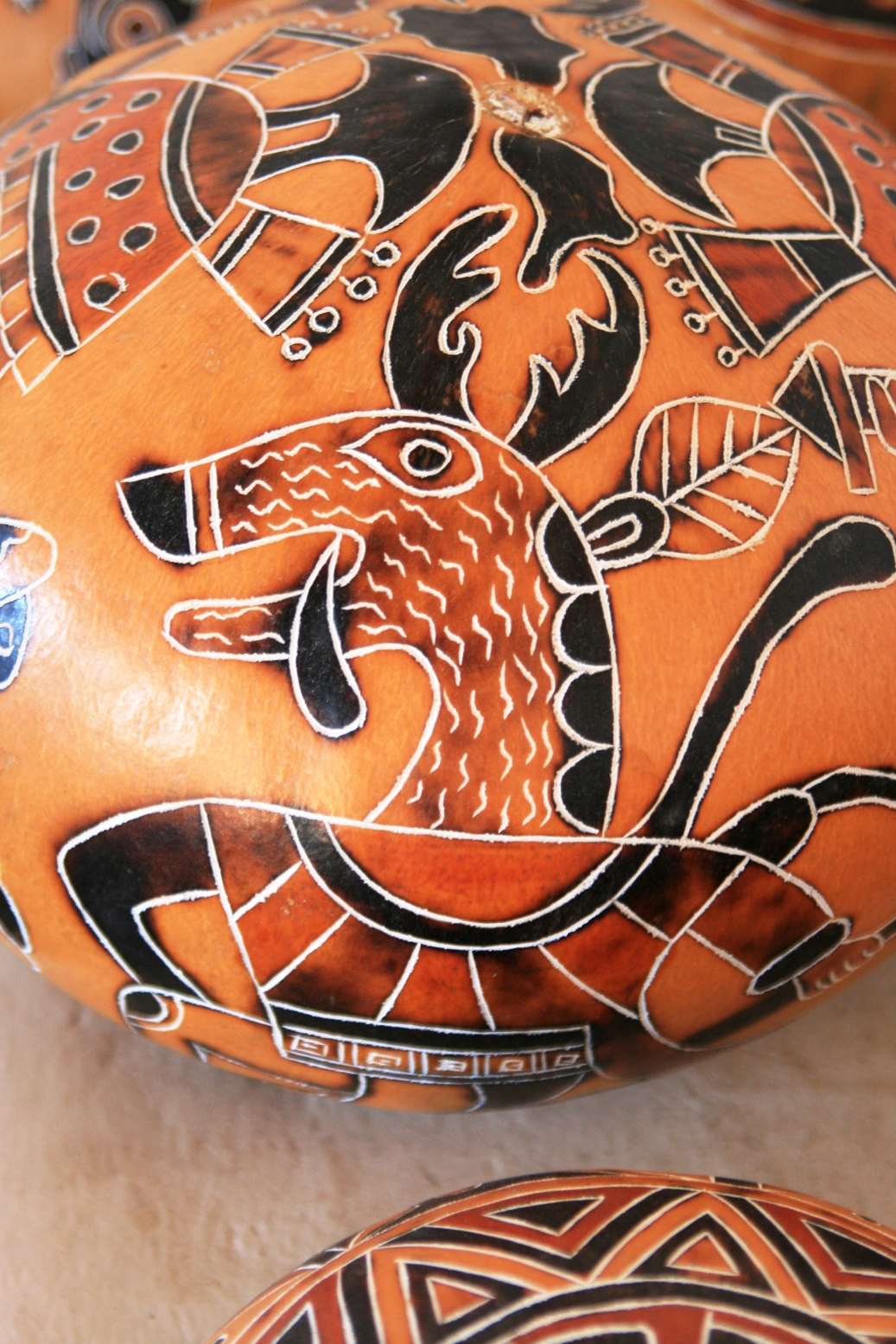
Deer-headed figure on Moche pottery from Sipán, near Pampa Grande. Tumbas Reales de Sipán Museum, Lambayeque city

Pampa Grande is an archaeological site located in the Lambayeque Valley, in northern Peru, situated on the south shore of the Chancay-Lambayeque River. It is located to the east of the city of Chiclayo.

This ancient city belonged both to Cupisnique and to Chavin cultures, and the earliest dates are around 600 BC. Later, during the Moche period (c. 600 – c. 700 AD), the city was a major regional capital. Another famous Moche site, Sipán, is located only about 10 km west from Pampa Grande along the Chancay-Lambayeque River valley.

== Geography and climate ==
Pampa Grande is located about 54 km inland from the Pacific Ocean.

During the time of the Moche occupation at Pampa Grande the Lambayeque Valley generally had a moderate climate year round. The average temperature measures about 22 °C (72 °F) and ranges from 10 to 35 °C (50 to 95 °F) depending on the seasons. In the winter months from June to September, the El Niño current picks up and brings torrential rains and wind changes to coastal areas. However, these rains rarely hit the valley, as the annual precipitation levels are minimal. The rainy season lasts from February to April. The Chancay-Lambayeque River is filled to capacity during the rainy season.

Considerable rains must have hit the site since the Moche period, because the architecture of the site, including the main pyramid, has been severely eroded.

== Site chronology ==
During the Early Horizon Period (900–200 BC):

- Cupisnique and Chavin occupations – 600–300 BC
- Moche I – 300–200 BC

The Early Intermediate Period (200 BC–600 AD)

- Moche II–IV – 100 BC–500 AD. Varied but expansive architecture, not portable artifacts. Phases III and IV developed a "momentum" of increased polity.

The Middle Horizon (600–1000 AD)

- Moche V – 600–700 AD. Biochrome/polychrome painted vessels/jars represent Moche V artistic tradition. Diversity in architectural structures exists to a further extent than Moche IV.
- Wari culture (or Huari) and Tiahuanaco – 700–800 AD. The rectangular enclosures and settlement plan are evidence of Huari Empirical domination and development.

The Late Intermediate Period (1000–1450 AD)

- Chimu culture – 1000–1400 AD

The Late Horizon

- Inca – 1476–1534 AD There is surprisingly little Inca pottery or materials left from their dominance until the arrival of the Spaniards.

There is little evidence left from pre-Moche II phases. If there were any significant evidence left behind, much of it would have been destroyed by the later Moche civilization phases. According to Shimada, the "post-Moche V developments in the region remain largely unknown." This makes Moche phases II–V the most examined periods.

== Excavation and research history ==
The site was excavated with a large team of students and professionals for the Royal Ontario Museum Project starting in 1973, and continuing through 1975. Dr. Kent C. Day, Izumi Shimada, Melody Shimada, Andrew Ignatieff, Martha Anders, Hans Knapp, John Haas, Manuel Arboleda, and Juan Cabanillas all participated in the excavation from 1973–1975.

Many of these participants helped in some way in the interpretation of the site as well. In addition, Terry D'Altroy, Christine Krueger, Ciro Hurtado, and Christopher B. Donnan were also involved in the interpretations at Pampa Grande.

Starting in 2004, Llana Johnson worked at the site for her dissertation at UCLA.

== Late Moche period ==
During the late Moche V period, Pampa Grande became one of the largest Moche sites anywhere, and occupied the area of more than 400 ha.

Starting around 600 AD, new constructions were laid out and built in a short period of time, including an enormous ceremonial complex. At the heart of the complex is Huaca Grande, also known locally as Huaca Fortaleza—the tallest ceremonial platform in Peru.

== Agriculture and economy ==
=== Crops and agriculture ===
The villages surrounding the urban center at Pampa Grande were likely small agricultural villages, which farmed for themselves and the Moche elite. Elaborate irrigation systems leading to the valley floors that stemmed from nearby rivers supported the rural farmers and led to intensification in agricultural production. Another large landscape change was the mound of Huaca Grande. Huaca Grande, a large pyramid structure, was constructed with adobe bricks. It arose as the Pampa Grande Elite gained political and economic power.

Macrobotanical remains show us that the non-urban farmers cultivated domestic plants such as beans, maize, squash, sweet potatoes, peanuts, chili pepper, gourd, algorrobo and cotton. Storage facilities "revealed pollen spores from the fern and monocot families. These types of plants were likely used for medicinal purposes and/or as animal fodder". The paleobotanical collection also has several wild species that could have been used for "fuel, building materials, animal fodder, medicine, and herbs". Several types of lithic artifacts were discovered in and around Pampa Grande. The stone adzes, which were bifacially flaked with appendages in order to be hafted to wooden handles, were used for tilling and harvesting. Batáns, large grinding stones, and manos, which were smaller hand-held grinding stones, were found in most every household. (Johnson, 2010: 119–120) In addition, scarce amounts of copper were found. Including fishing net weights, needles and fishhooks.

=== Hunting and faunal remains ===
There seems to be little evidence of hunting within Pampa Grande, as most of the 1,200 animal bones found were from domesticated animals. The tools were primarily agricultural focused with the exception of butchering tools. However, there were nearby sites that hunted for sea lions, deer, and snails. In addition to domestic animal remains, marine shells, and guinea pig feces were found.

The many faunal remains include, but are not limited to, marine invertebrate and vertebrate remains like shellfish, bony fish, and sea lion. Some of the terrestrial vertebrates uncovered include dog, guinea pig, iguana, llama and alpaca and rodents. There were "extensive marine species, large quantities of camelid (alpaca and llama), and moderate quantities of small terrestrial mammals".

=== Trade ===
In the Late Moche Period households lost autonomy and became reliant on elites and specialists, and integrated into the complex urban economy. "As agriculture intensifies and populations become concentrated in cities, the transmission of valuable goods and land increases in importance as resources become more limited". This led to specialization. Specialized items such as ceramics, figurines, beads, ornaments and spindle whirls were traded among urbanites at Pampa Grande.

Exotic foods such as "white-tailed deer, sea lion, coca leaves, aji peppers, and many types of fruits" are found rarely in domestic contexts, but appear in elite households, which suggests the powerful had greater trading capability. However, there seems to have been a steady flow of shellfish from the nearby Pacific Ocean. High quality polychrome vessels have been found that source to the Wari Empire. This civilization was located in the Central Andean Highlands.

=== Specialization ===
We see specialization occur for two specific reasons at Pampa Grande. Johnson explains that, "agricultural intensification around Pampa Grande, coupled with periodic droughts, left much of the valley without sufficient water for agriculture. This resulted in a large population in need of work and subsistence goods, thus requiring valley inhabitants to aggregate at Pampa Grande and find specialized non-agricultural work". In addition to this, "standardization is a good indicator of specialization because it reflects the producers' concern with efficiency and homogeneity.

At Pampa Grande there were numerous elite-sponsored workshops, which had minimal evidence of habitation. These workshops had controlled access, so as to keep the materials inside of them. Though many of the specialists in these workshops were commoners, elites also took part in craft production. Family and households also produced specialized goods, but on a much less controlled basis. Family units often organized their labor by kinship relations and operated in independent and domestic compounds. Such workshops were more loosely monitored by local authorities. And often, only checked up on when goods were expected as tribute to the elite.

Urban households would have been reliant on economic and social relationships in order to acquire specialized household utilitarian products. The production of material and agricultural goods seems to have been gendered. The "female roles in the household included more daily and maintenance activities related to child rearing and food preparation, while males engaged in more specialized activities related to the production of craft and agricultural items". We see standardization, by using molds, among many of the vessels, including: "stirrup-spout bottles figurines, rattles, whistles, and trumpets. Many storage vessels were made without molds as well, however by the later Moche phases, there was a significant increase in vessels produced using molds.

== Artifacts and architecture ==
=== Types of architecture ===
There are two types of structures found at Pampa Grande, the elite Huacas and the common housing and occupational "Units". Huacas are earthen pyramids made from large adobe bricks built during the Middle Moche Period. They served as spaces for public and private rituals and housed the elite. The tops of the Huacas were platforms standing over public plazas. Huaca Grande is the largest Huaca located at Pampa Grande out of twenty-two Huacas. The units can be divided into two groups. In general, there are occupational units on the outer edge of the urban area and the residential units placed all around the site.

The urban center had many residential compounds, both for the higher-class elite and the lower class. The high-class compounds were built with higher quality materials and craftsmanship and commonly have high privacy walls that distinguish them. The materials used in construction at Pampa Grande seem to be the locally accessible materials rather than culturally ideal materials. The adobe bricks were basic sun-dried mud bricks that are found as one of the main architectural components. In addition to adobe brick, quadrangular rock was a common building material. For mortar, many techniques were used. Often found, there was dirt interior with clay on the exterior, or mud with fragments of utilitarian ceramic were used as mortar. Walls were also "constructed using a core-and-veneer masonry style. This architectural style is common at Moche sites and consists of rubble interior surrounded by nicely-shaped stones that form an external veneer". For elite housing, large pieces of rock would have been carried from a nearby source on the backs of camelids (alpaca, llamas) and cut to size as construction took place. This technique was also used in constructing the Huacas.

=== Changes in architecture ===
As in most cases, the architecture at Pampa Grande developed as the society developed socially, economically, and politically. At the time of the Late Moche Period, larger urban areas developed around the "necks of some valleys in order to control access to water". The earlier household units were constructed of multiple differing structures with different functions. As time went by the more common household unit was an apartment style building divided internally for different functionality.

Ethnicity, status, wealth and religious ideologies can often be determined from decoration on utilitarian and elaborate, valuable items. "However, very little evidence for the presence of different ethnic groups has been found at Moche cities during any time period". The "indicators of socio-economic status are household size, architectural design, and household artifacts". As mentioned above, more elite classes had higher quality materials and better craftsmanship in their household units as a way of differentiating between elite and common people. This included more durable materials for higher walls and foundation, and core-and-veneer masonry style of construction. This is contrasting to the mortar used by the non-elites made of dirt and clay. Elite dwellings also have additional patios and extra living space in comparison to common dwellings. These extra spaces are often used for exclusive or special economic and social events and activities.

=== Common artifacts ===
The most commonly found artifacts at Pampa Grande are ceramic artifacts. The difference between elite and common housing units can be determined by the type of ceramics found in the unit as well as the architecture of the unit. Utilitarian ceramics make up the majority of the ceramic artifacts. These utilitarian pieces include the common "large storage vessels (also referred to as tinajas, paicas, or urns), ollas (short-neck/neckless vessels with large openings), jars (globular vessels with restricted openings and short to tall rims), and to a lesser extent fineware ceramics, such as floreros (flaring-rim bowls), and stirrup-spout bottles (Gayoso and Gamarra 2005). Other vessel forms include single-spout and handle bottles, dippers, bowls, and plates".

Many of these ceramic artifacts were mass-produced by using molds. However, it was not until the population at Pampa Grande developed over time that the mass-production of molded ceramics became popular. Utilitarian, mass-produced storage ceramics are often associated with lower economic class. Face-neck jars are storage vessels recovered from all over, which is one way we can tell they are signifiers of lower socio-economic class. These jars frequently depict a human or animal face on one side. However, a small number of the face-neck jars are made without molds and are stamped with the face design into the neck. This is would be an example of higher quality but common utilitarian vessel. "Higher quality, labor-intensive vessels such as painted stirrup spouts and high burnished blackware bowls" are associated with higher socio-economic status and are found less often at Pampa Grande.

== Leadership and inequality ==
=== Government and leadership ===
Because of Pampa Grande's geographical location, at the neck of the river in the valley, centralization of power was important to maintain control over the water source in order to protect against drought. As agricultural intensification led to drought, Pampa Grande inhabitants needed new forms of work that a new bureaucratic government helped establish and oversee. However, speculations on governmental and elite structures are generalized and talked about as the Moche elite, and no specific claims are made about Pampa Grande as a single site.

After the new system of production was created, the elite members managed different specialists directly, or indirectly. Household hierarchies were based on kin relationships. There was significant ancestor worship sponsored by the state.

The basis on which elites rise or are put in power are never discussed in any of the sources.

=== Evidence of inequality ===
Architecture is one way to differentiate between socio-economic classes. The Huaca living quarters and the common unit living quarters are one obvious and extreme difference in architecture that shows the socio-economic class difference. The pyramids, like Huaca Grande, were signs of power for the Moche. They were constructed quickly with a timesaving method in order to have immediate power and likely put poor people to work and subordinate them. Within the Huacas there were smaller rooms that likely served at living and cooking quarters for the servants to the elite. Such social segregation is evidence of oppression or coercion of the poor inhabitants.

There is debate about how rigid the social class boundaries were at Pampa Grande. Izumi Shimada believes there were strictly four social classes; "(1) the highest class of elites, religious specialists, and administrators, (2) elites that played key roles in the procurement and allocation of valuable raw materials and production of wealth items, (3) supervisors and managers of production activities with a certain degree of social mobility, and (4) the lowest and largest class of laborers who commuted to work in the fields and craft production workshops". IIana Johnson, on the other hand, concludes that there were much less rigid social boundaries. She sites the evidence of differing architectural sectors correlating with naturally occurring topographical differences. This gives leads her to the conclusion that they were not so strictly segregated.

There has been no specific reporting on burials or skeletal remains. We do know, however, that most of the burials were inside building (domestic) complexes/units or inside workshops. Some artifacts that were found among such burials are spindle whorls, copper plates and knives, many ceramic artifacts and occasionally gold and silver that indicated higher or elite status. This indicates that people were buried with materials related to their occupation and status, which seem to be related.

== Religion and ideology ==
=== Deities ===
There are two common types of representations of iconographic art on ceramic materials; fineline painting and three-dimensional forms.

Fineline drawing tradition is common late Moche style. Many iconographic representations have realistic animal and human images in the Moche culture. Paintings portraying deities are most commonly found on ceramic stirrup bottle spouts. Identical motifs of "bird-with-bowl, ritual runners, and deities fighting" can be found at Pampa Grande and Galindo, which is 160 km away.

Figures resembling an anthropomorphized iguana and an elderly individual, described as wrinkle face, were significant characters towards the beginning of Phase V in the Moche period.

'Wrinkle face', a mythological deity, is recognized from its "wide round eyes, snarling-fanged mouth, and dense wrinkles over the entire face". 'Wrinkle face', carved or stamped three-dimensionally onto face-neck jars, is frequently depicted fighting supernatural creatures.

Nude, bound warriors are often depicted on neck-jars. These depictions are not likely mythical creatures, but rather, ritualistic representations of warriors.

According to ethno historical records it was the men who were involved in the specialized activities, whereas women were child bearers and domestic individuals. Therefore it might be likely that it was the men who performed any ritualistic duties. However, there is no ethno historic evidence specifically concerning mythical or ritual aspects of Pampa Grande society.

However, at some point, most of the traditional Moche "iconographic elements ceased to be depicted". The realistic animal and human imagery, commonly found on utilitarian ceramic ware, was replaced with geometrical patterns. These new designs are suggested to be abbreviated versions of the earlier detailed images and motifs in Moche traditional art.

The "Temple of the Stairway and Wave" is a geometrical band motif that is assumed to have been symbolic of the place where rituals and human sacrifice took place.

There is no evidence of written records from Pampa Grande.

=== Religious rituals ===
Huacas were the equivalent of palaces or temples. They served as spaces for public and private rituals and housed the elite. The tops of the Huacas were platforms standing over public plazas. Huaca Fortaleza (Huaca Grande) is the tallest man-made earthen structure in South America. It includes numerous murals, like previous ceremonial Moche pyramids. Some of the murals were on the lower, exterior, visible from public areas, while some were on upper terraces. This suggests that the Huacas at Pampa Grande were used for ritualistic (public) ceremonies.

The murals on the first terrace featured a reoccurring red and orange reptile, resembling an iguana. (Haas, 1985: 400) There is also evidence of concentrated luxury goods and foods in the lofty, spacious rooms in the Huaca that suggest it was the residence for the ruling elite. There are amulets and votives figurines recovered that are believed to have been used in shamanistic practices among households. There is a presence of patios in domestic structures. These were likely used for domestic events and rituals, like home worship.

No altars are found on the huacas at Pampa Grande, like other similar sacrificial Moche sites.

=== Elites in religious life ===
The only priest figures mentioned are the Bird priest and the Priestess, which are major Moche icons, but not found at Pampa Grande. Shamanistic traditions were performed using figurines in order to cure illness, help with pregnancy and fertility, and to recognize rights of passage. The social standing of the shamans have never been discussed in the sources. The evidence for domestic ancestor worship suggests the elite were also partaking in ancestor worship. This means their ancestors would have probably been wealthy and their fortune was passed down in the family and had the most influence in development of the state.

== Death ==
=== Treatment ===
There has been little reporting on burials or skeletal remains. We do know, however, that most of the burials were inside building (domestic) complexes/units or inside workshops. Some artifacts that were found among such burials are spindle whorls, copper plates and knives, many ceramic artifacts and occasionally gold and silver that indicated higher or elite status. This indicates that people were buried with materials related to their occupation and status, which seem to be related. Other than potential looting, the few burials that were mentioned seemed to have been left at peace by the residents of Pampa Grande.

From the few burial artifacts, we can see that the women are buried with things related to their occupation, which was frequently domestic. Primarily, we see spindle whorls and threading weights at the female burials. In male burials there are typically copper-metal smelted artifacts, along with ceramics. There is one case of a burial in a communal plaza, located inside of a domestic complex. This suggests kinship ties among the complex, and also contributes to the theory that Pampa Grande residents practiced ancestor worship, because the burial was in a ritualistic plaza.

It is more likely to find evidence of external influence in the burials of the elites. As Shimada explains, the elite would have more contact with external figures and would be more likely than the commoners to integrate external art into their burial goods. Also, elites were commonly buried with larger amounts of status items than commoners. It seems as though there were no wars or battles at Pampa Grande, so there would be no evidence for how enemies/foreigners were treated differently from local residents.

=== Causes of death ===
There was a pottery workshop discovered that had two potters (who likely worked in the workshop) buried with large amounts of high status artifacts. These potters were likely highly skilled elite members of society. They both were afflicted by "professional traumas." "They suffered from rheumatism in the hands and arthritis on the backbone, hands, and knees, which correspond with activities related to long-term pottery manufacture". This case is the only case from excavated parts of the site to have evidence of disease or trauma.

== Warfare and violence ==
=== Evidence ===
There is no evidence of trauma on the very limited skeletal remains. No mass graves were found. The location and architecture were agriculturally focused, rather than militarily focused. There are no historical written records, and little ethno-historic evidence for warfare or violence.

=== Organized warfare vs. localized violence ===
There is no evidence for conquest of Pampa Grande or that Pampa Grande made any advances on other polities. The artistic styles seemed to have evolved over-time not in relation to conquest.

There were numerous elite-sponsored workshops, which had minimal evidence of habitation. These workshops had controlled access, so as to keep the materials inside of them. Family and households also produced specialized goods, but on a much less controlled basis. Local authorities more loosely monitored family and household workshops. It is likely that they only checked up on household workshops when goods were expected as tribute to the elite. However, there is no evidence suggesting the tribute paid to or from anywhere outside of the town and closely surrounding areas.

== Writing, art, and symbolism ==
=== Writing system ===
There has been no evidence or discovery of a writing system at Pampa Grande.

=== Symbolic motifs ===
There are a few different recurring motifs that appear at Pampa Grande. The most common motifs are the "bird with a bowl" or bird priest, waves, "wrinkle face" and iguana figures. The bird priest appears commonly on ceramics in the Moche culture, but is scarcely found at Pampa Grande. However, this is such a common Moche figurine, that it is important to consider when looking at Pampa Grande. This motif is part bird and part human, and would have been part of sacrificial or other ceremonies. It is often displayed in scenes fighting other deities. However, its meaning and interpretation is contested.

Waves are frequently found at Pampa Grande, primarily on ceramics/pottery. The waves have two different interpretations. Often waves appear in conjunction with right triangles or "stairs". These geometric shapes would have served as an abbreviated version of earlier and more complex motifs. The first way this geometric motif has been interpreted is symbolizing marine life and its importance. Expert, Ilana Johnson, explains one way the waves can be interpreted. They "…could have been an abbreviated version of the stylized catfish or double-headed serpent motif found in panels on the murals at Huaca de la Luna and Huaca El Brujo [other Moche sites]". The second way these wave motifs are interpreted are as the Temple of the Stairway and Wave. This is said to have been a ceremonial place where ritual human sacrifice took place. The wave motif is often found in several places on one piece of pottery.

"Wrinkle face" was likely a deity or religious/political figure at Pampa Grande. He is often painted (fineline) onto pottery. The pottery typically depicts Wrinkle face as a snarling, wrinkled face with large, round eyes. Similarly to the bird priest, Wrinkle face is often shown battling other mythological deities or shown in a burial scene.

Murals on the first terrace of Huaca Grande featured a reoccurring red and orange reptile, resembling an iguana. (Haas, 1985: 400) The iguana figures were most commonly found in Huaca Grande. It is likely that iguanas were eaten at Pampa Grande because they are found to be a luxury dish in current day Peru. It is possible that the iguanas were also represented by Wrinkle face, however that is an uncertain interpretation. Their purpose in the terraces of Huaca Grande along with their symbolic meaning is unclear. (Haas, 1985: 400)

== The End ==
=== Abandonment ===
The abandonment of Pampa Grande took place not long after 700 AD. No experts discuss the evidence of abandonment, but rather discuss it as a known point in Pampa Grande's history. They instead discuss the details of the different theories as to why and how the site was abandoned and what evidence supported such theories.

Three theories exist about the abandonment of Pampa Grande. However, Shimada explains that these theories have issues because the "available data pertaining to this problematic time period are largely ambiguous because of their fragmentary nature…".

Nevertheless, the arguments for each theory have data to support them. First, a flood possibly due to unusual rains, followed by El Nino sparked the abandonment. Excavations have found "thick and uniform deposits of water-borne sand and silt" on floor surfaces. It is suggested that the deposits are a result of a single large flood. In addition to the existence of the silt deposit, it covers everything presumed to have been on the floor surface at the time of abandonment. Shimada cautions, however, that the date of the flood is difficult to pinpoint. Also, the deposit is possibly a result of numerous floods.

External invasion by the Huari Empire is another theory, however weak; Shimada explains it could have led to the abandonment of Pampa Grande. There are Huari style objects that are found at Pampa Grande. In addition to the Huari objects, almost all domestic rooms had large amounts of carbonized wood. This suggests that these spaces were burned as part of the Huari invasion. However, this interpretation loses credibility because of the isolated occurrences of Huari style artifacts. This evidence is not "adequate proof" of a Huari invasion.

Internal forces and conditions weakened the society making it susceptible to forces and events. The establishment of Pampa Grande was so rapid. The governing body and system was never firmly established, which led to changes in the way Pampa Grande was run. This made the structure of the economy susceptible to unrest and other events.

There is evidence of a redistributive economy made possible by tributes made to the elites. With such a model, if a large environmental problem occurred, accompanied by increasingly complex population, tributes would only be plausible up to a certain point. This is one possible way Shimada discusses for the revolt of the people as the cause of abandonment.

==== Structures damaged by fire ====
The theory of revolt is the most widely accepted. The violent ending is interpreted with the data of widespread intensive burning of domestic and other structures, as mentioned above in the Huari invasion theory. There also is a large amount of burnt corn and beans in storage facilities. The burnt roofing that lays directly on burnt floor surfaces may indicate that the fire and abandonment occurred around the same time.

One stray piece of evidence in this theory is that many adobe units that show no sign of destruction by fire. In addition to this, the burnt adobe structures do not necessarily show signs of intentional destruction. Many of the artifacts are intact.

=== After abandonment/ later occupation ===
There is evidence for Huari and/or Tiahuanaco cultural occupation shortly after the abandonment. However, there is little evidence of the extent to which the site was occupied at this time.

The Chimu culture shows up in the surrounding areas a significant amount of time after the Huari.

The Inca have clearly had a presence at Pampa Grande dating from 1476 to the early 1500s. However, there is little pottery or material remains until the arrival of the Spaniards in 1532.
