= Royal Tombs of Sipán Museum =

Coordinates: 6.705°S 79.8994°W

- Museo Tumbas Reales de Sipán
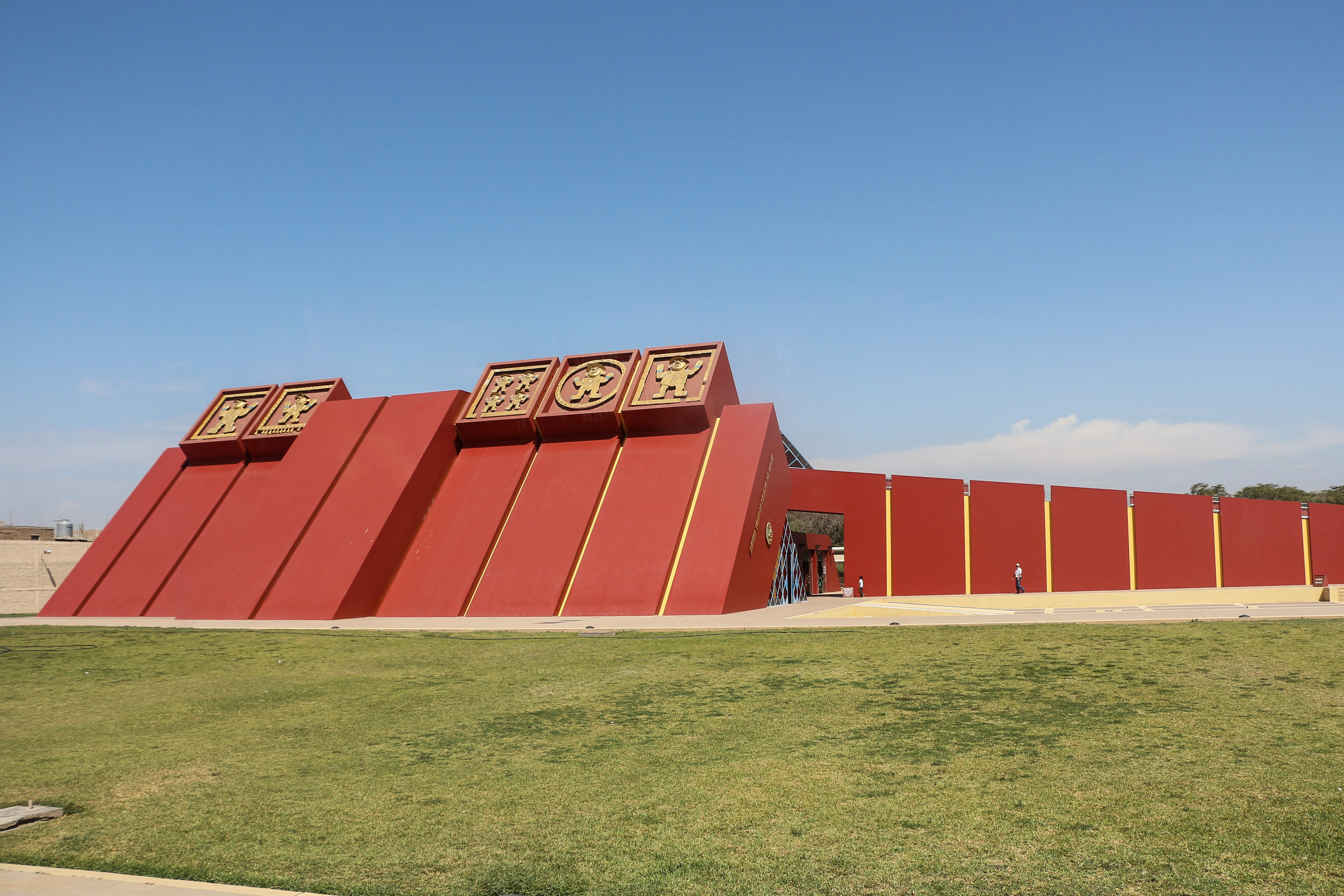
- Exterior of the Museum.
- Established: 2002
- Location: Lambayeque, Peru
- Type: Archaeological museum
- Visitors: 186,575 (2013)
- Director: Walter Alva
- Architect: Celso Prado Pastor

The Royal Tombs of Sipán Museum (Spanish: Museo Tumbas Reales de Sipán) is a museum in Lambayeque, Peru. It contains most of the important artifacts (ceremonial vessels, necklaces and jewelry) found at Huaca Rajada by archeologist Walter Alva in 1987, including the Lord of Sipán and his entourage. The museum was inaugurated in 2002.

The museum was designed to resemble the ancient Moche tombs. Visitors go up an external ramp and enter at the upper level to view the burial of the Lord of Sipán and a priest, then move down to see the burial of the Old Lord of Sipán.

== See also ==
- Lord of Sipán
- Brüning Museum
