= Ventarron =

Cultural heritage site in Peru

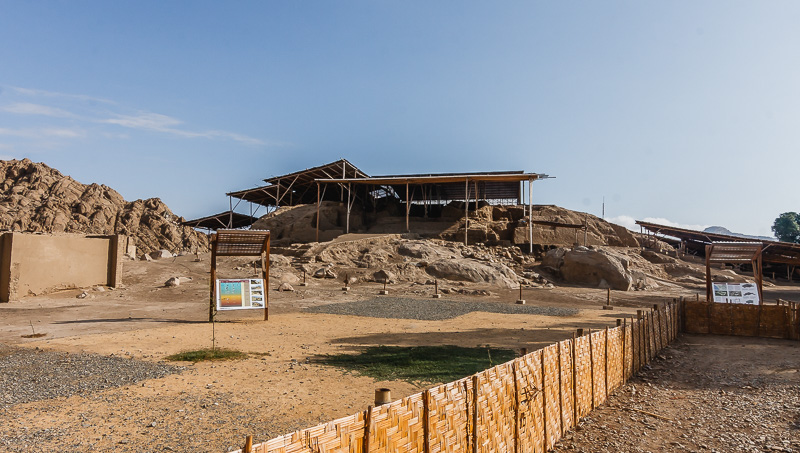

- Location within Peru Location within South America
- Interactive map of Ventarron
- 6°48′00″S 79°45′19″W
- Periods: Andean preceramic Archaic Period (Americas); Formative stage
- Location: Pomalca District, Chiclayo province, Lambayeque Region
- Region: Northern Peru

History
- Built: c. 2035-2300 B.C

Site notes
- Elevation: 51–88 m (167–289 ft)
- Area: 2,500 m^{2} (27,000 sq ft)
- Owner: Government of Peru
- Public access: Yes

Ventarrón is the site of a 4,500-year-old temple with painted murals, which was excavated in Peru in 2007 near Chiclayo, in the Lambayeque region on the northern coast. The site was inhabited by the Early Cupisnique, Cupisnique, Chavin and Moche cultures.

On 12 November 2017, a fire, reportedly caused by farmers burning nearby sugar cane fields, damaged much of the site.

== Location ==
Located in a valley, the complex covers about 2500 square meters (27,000 square feet). The site is about 12 miles from Sipán, a religious and political center of the later Moche culture, which flourished from AD 1 to AD 700 (about 2000 to 1300 years ago). It is about 760 km (470 mi) north of Peru's capital of Lima.

The central complex of Ventarron also includes the archaeological site of Arenal, located on a hillslope to the northeast.

== Murals ==
The temple and murals were radio carbon dated to 2000 B.C., the latter of which is thought to be the oldest discovered in the Americas. One mural on two walls depicts a deer caught in a net; another has an abstract design in red and white. The temple was constructed of bricks of river sediment rather than the stone or adobe later to be traditional in the area; its construction is unique for the northern coast. It contains a stairway leading to a fire altar.

Walter Alva, the Peruvian archaeologist making the discovery, commented on the findings:

"What's surprising are the construction methods, the architectural design and most of all the existence of murals that could be the oldest in the Americas. He said, "The discovery of this temple reveals evidence suggesting the region of Lambayeque was one of great cultural exchange between the Pacific coast and the rest of Peru."

== Excavations ==
The team discovered likely ceremonial offerings, including the skeletons of a parrot and a monkey, which would have come from Peru's jungle regions, and shells typical of coastal Ecuador. These indicated the range of exchange.

Alva and his team worked three months on the excavation. They said that the culture that built the temple had intentionally buried it when finished with its use. This helped to protect it for thousands of years. Locals have dug away at the site, taking blocks to use in constructing their own buildings. Much of the Ventarrón site had been looted in 1990 and 1992, but the thieves had not found the temple.

In the 1980s Alva led the discovery of the tomb of the Lord of Sipán and other elite ancient people at the Moche center, a much later culture whose people also were based in Lambayeque. The royal tomb included generations of burials from about 300 AD, or 1700 years ago.

Since 2007, the excavations have been directing by Ignacio Alva who has unearthed several phases of human presence in the temple and made important new discoveries such as an ancient frieze in high relief retaining their original colors with typical Cupisnique iconography.

=== Other temples in the area ===
Three temples have been discovered in this area in recent years.

A Cupisnique adobe temple was discovered nearby in 2008; this site is now known as "Collud". This temple sheds some light on the connection between the Cupisnique and the Chavin because of shared iconography.

The Chavin people who came after the Cupisnique built a temple adjacent to Collud about three hundred years later; this location is named "Zarpan".

All three temples are close together, and form a single archaeological site. There are numerous shared elements between these locations.

"During the Formative Period, probably beginning in the Initial Period, the Collud-Zarpán site, situated at the northwest end of the Huaca Ventarrón Complex, was the valley’s theocratic capital. It covered more than 2 square kilometers of ceremonial architecture spread between two mounds aligned east to west."

== See also ==
- Andean preceramic
- Huaca Prieta
