= Cupisnique =

Pre-Columbian culture in northern Peru

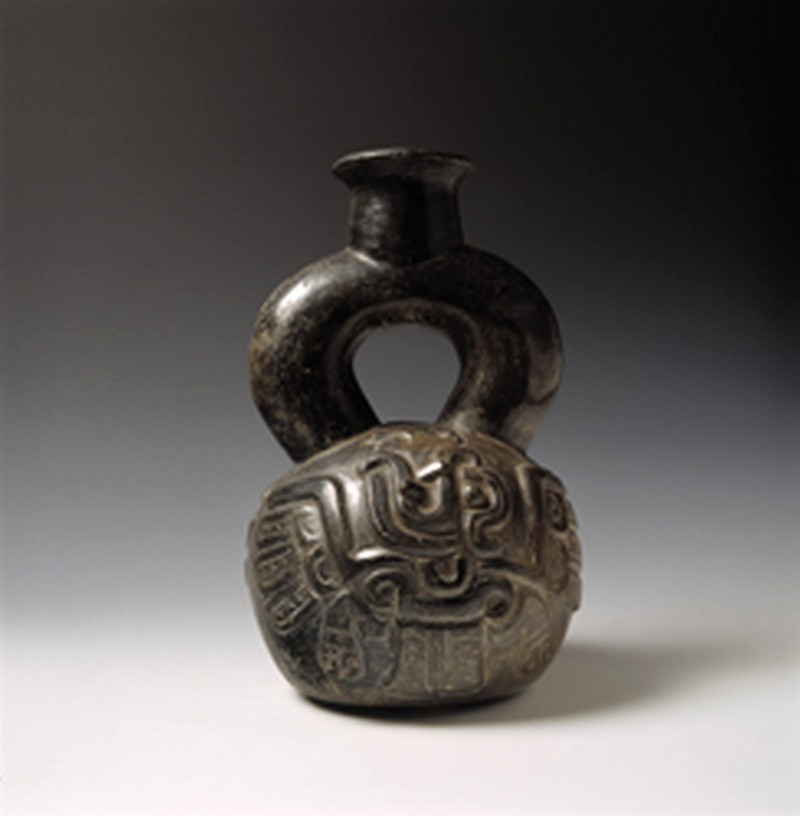
Stirrup-handled Cupinisque ceramic vase 1250 BC (Larco Museum collection)

The Cupisnique culture was a pre-Columbian indigenous culture that flourished from c. 1500 to 500 BC along what now is Peru's northern Pacific coast. The culture had a distinctive style of adobe clay architecture. Artifacts of the culture share artistic styles and religious symbols with the Chavin culture that arose in the same area at a later date.

== The Cupisnique and the Chavin ==
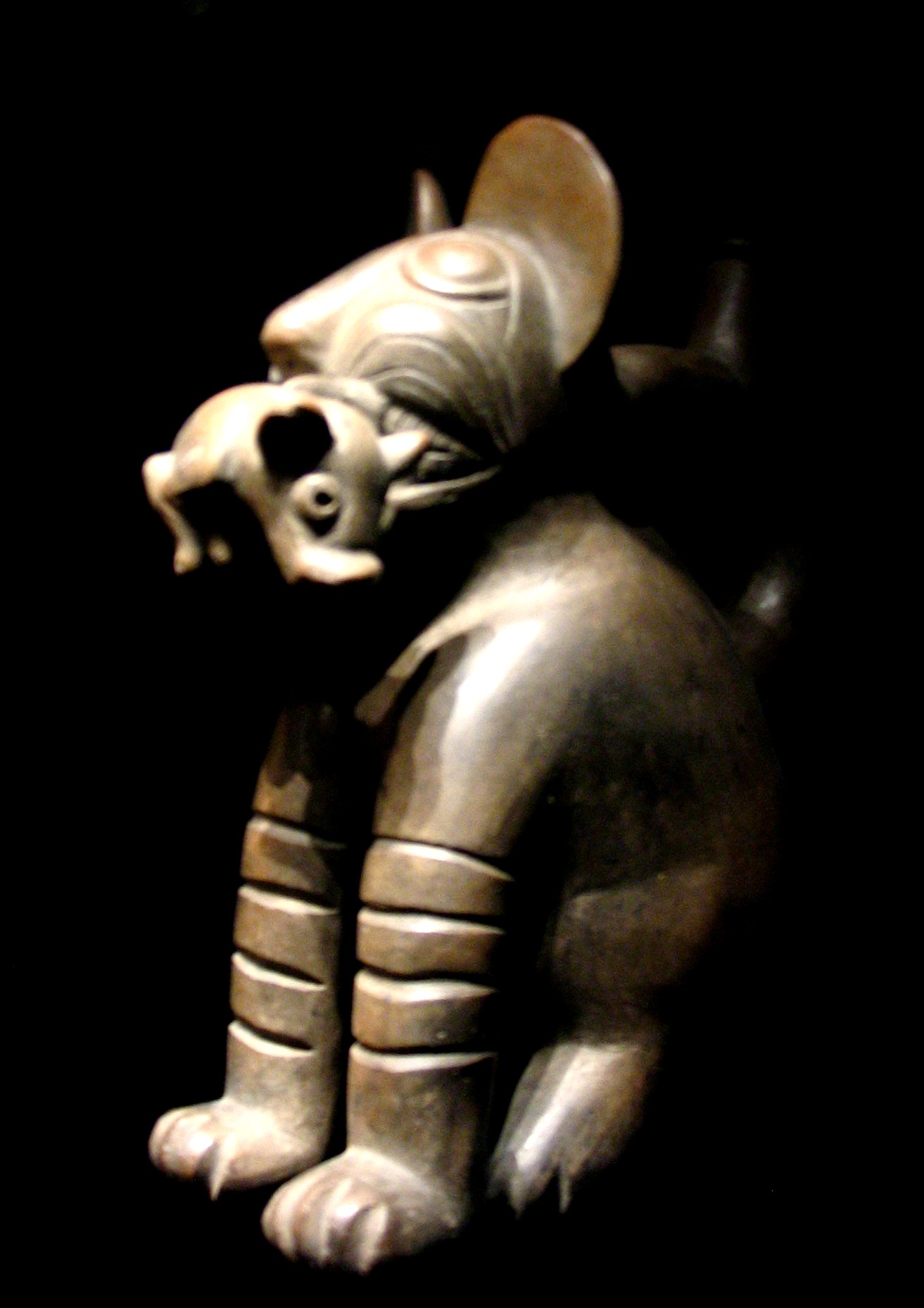
Cupisnique ceramic bottle depicting a feline with rounded ears, a distinctive characteristic of the ocelot (Musée du quai Branly, Paris)

The relationship between the Chavin culture and the Cupisnique culture is not well understood, and the names are sometimes used interchangeably. For instance, the anthropological scholar, Alana Cordy-Collins, treats as Cupisnique a culture lasting from 1000 – 200 BC, which are the dates some associate with the Chavin culture. Another scholar, Izumi Shimada, calls Cupisnique a possible ancestor of Mochica (Moche) culture with no mention of Chavin. Yet another scholar, Anna C. Roosevelt, refers to "the coastal manifestation of the Chavin Horizon... dominated by the Cupisnique style".

=== Spider deity temple discovered ===
A Cupisnique adobe temple was discovered in 2008 in the Lambayeque valley in the area of the archaeological site of Ventarron. That newly discovered temple was very close to the Ventarron temple. The adjacent location is known as "Collud".

This spider deity temple sheds some light on the connection between the Cupisnique and the Chavin because of shared iconography. In fact, some other related temples also had been discovered in the area at approximately the same time.

The Chavin people who came after the Cupisnique built a temple adjacent to Collud about three hundred years later, in a location named "Zarpan". The three temples are close together and form a single archaeological site.

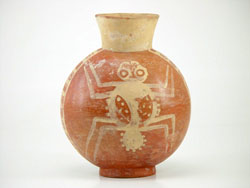
Ancient Moche people of Peru depicted spiders in their art, such as portrayed on this c. 300 AD ceramic artifact of the culture, with the spider deity shown holding a knife that often appears in depictions (Larco Museum)

There are many shared elements among motifs used in all three locations. For example, one common element is that of the spider deity. This spider motif appears to persevere from the 4,000-year-old temple of Ventarrón throughout time, to its appearance on artifacts of the Moche culture dated to c. 300 AD.

The temple found in 2008 also includes imagery of the spider deity, thought to be associated with rainfall, hunting, and warfare. The spider deity image combines a spider's neck and head, with the mouth of a large feline, and the beak of a bird.

According to the team leader Walter Alva,

"Cupisnique and Chavin shared the same gods and the same architectural and artistic forms, showing intense religious interaction among the cultures of the Early Formative Period from the north coast to the Andes and down to the central Andes."

== The Cupisnique and the Moche ==
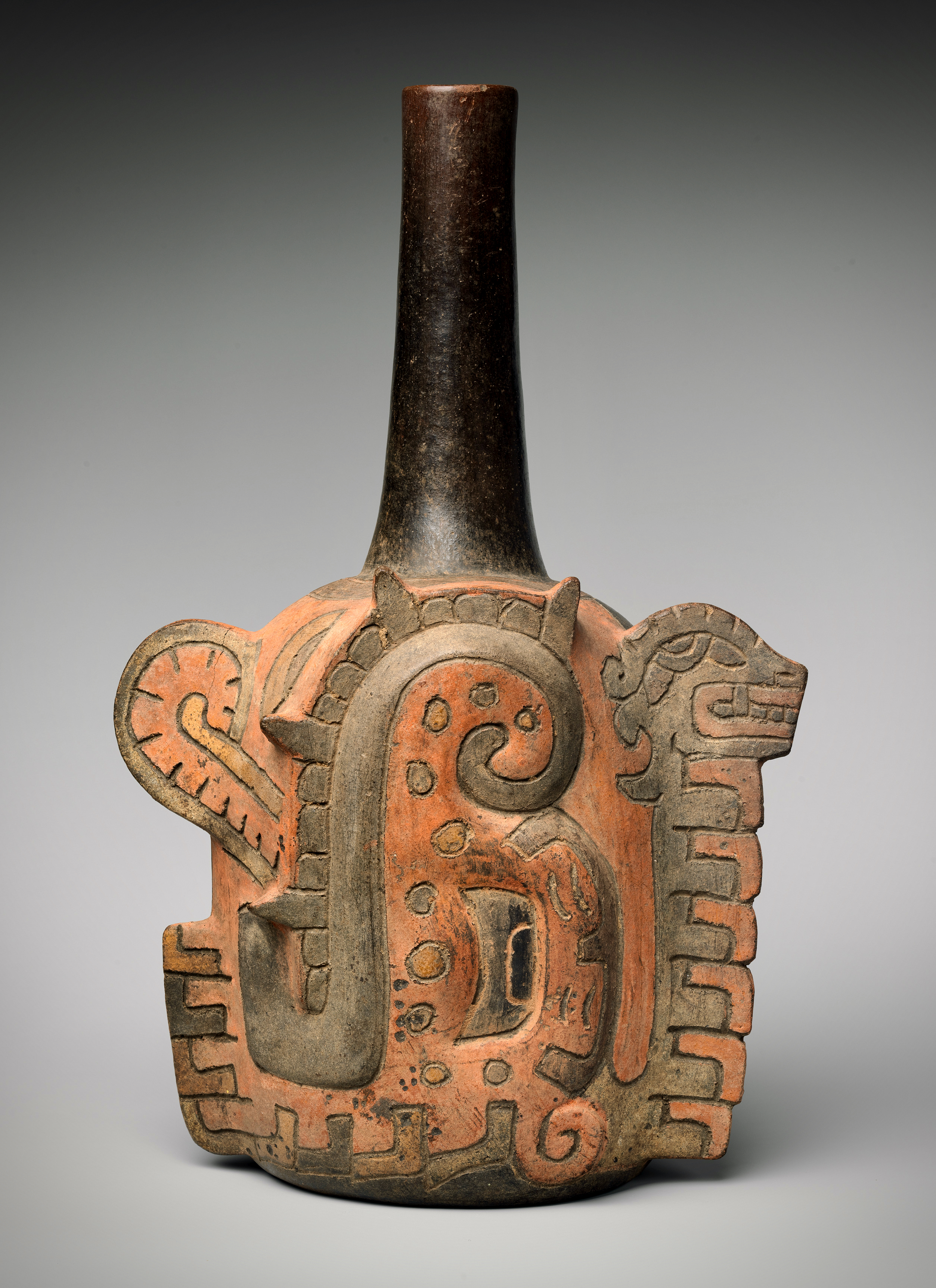
Cupisnique ceramic bottle 1000–800 B.C., with caiman body and feline head. Met Museum, NYC

Sometimes the Moche and the Cupisnique cultures are referred to interchangeably. The reason for that is because of similarities in their ceramic designs. The Moche were a very "vibrant" culture among emerging cultures within the Cupisnique society that had a base population of farming and fishing along with a middle and elite class.

The main connection between the Cupisnique and the Moche is the incorporation of the decapitation theme where there exists a decapitator and a decapitated character. In the Cupisnique society, "the decapitators appear in five supernatural guises: human, monster, bird, fish, and spider..." Moche decapitators are the same five plus two additional characters: the crab and the scorpion. Images of the five main decapitators from both the Cupisnique and the Moche culture appear in many references.

Scholars believe that the parallelism between Moche and Cupisnique iconography is not just coincidental, rather, that the Moche were "the heirs to a belief that they subscribed to in practice".

Sometimes the Cupisnique people are spoken of as a cult, due to two main reasons. The first reason being that there had been very "little direct evidence of their patterns of social organization, demography, or subsistence strategies". The second reason being the buildings [are] embellished with painted, incised stucco relief work depicting surreal creatures".

The Cupisnique motifs seem to be deeply rooted in religion, which apparently had a great influence upon the character of emerging cultures such as the Salinar, Vicus, Gallinazo, and as mentioned, the Moche culture.

== Other Cupisnique sites ==
One of the most important Cupisnique sites is Caballo Muerto in the Moche Valley.

In 2008, it was reported that archaeologists had excavated the Cupisnique site of Limoncarro in the Guadalupe District, Pacasmayo, La Libertad Region of the northern Peru coast. Two phases of construction were identified; among other things, animal faces indicating Cupisnique iconography were uncovered.

Kuntur Wasi is another site that was influenced by the Cupisnique culture.

In 2020, local farmers clearing land in the La Libertad region of northwestern Peru found the ruins of a shrine bearing a large mural painted in shades of ocher, yellow, gray and white. The site was previously unknown and it is estimated that about 60% of the shrine complex was accidentally destroyed during the process. Researchers have now identified the mural image as a 3,200-year-old painting of a knife-wielding spider god.

== Cupisnique mirrors ==
Mirrors dating to 900-200 BC were discovered in archaeological sites that have been identified as Cupisnique. They reflect high quality images.

== See also ==
- Columbian exchange
- Periodization of pre-Columbian Peru
- Population history of indigenous peoples of the Americas
