= Lambayeque, Peru =

Lambayeque Mochica: Ñampaxllæc San Pedro de Lambayeque
- City
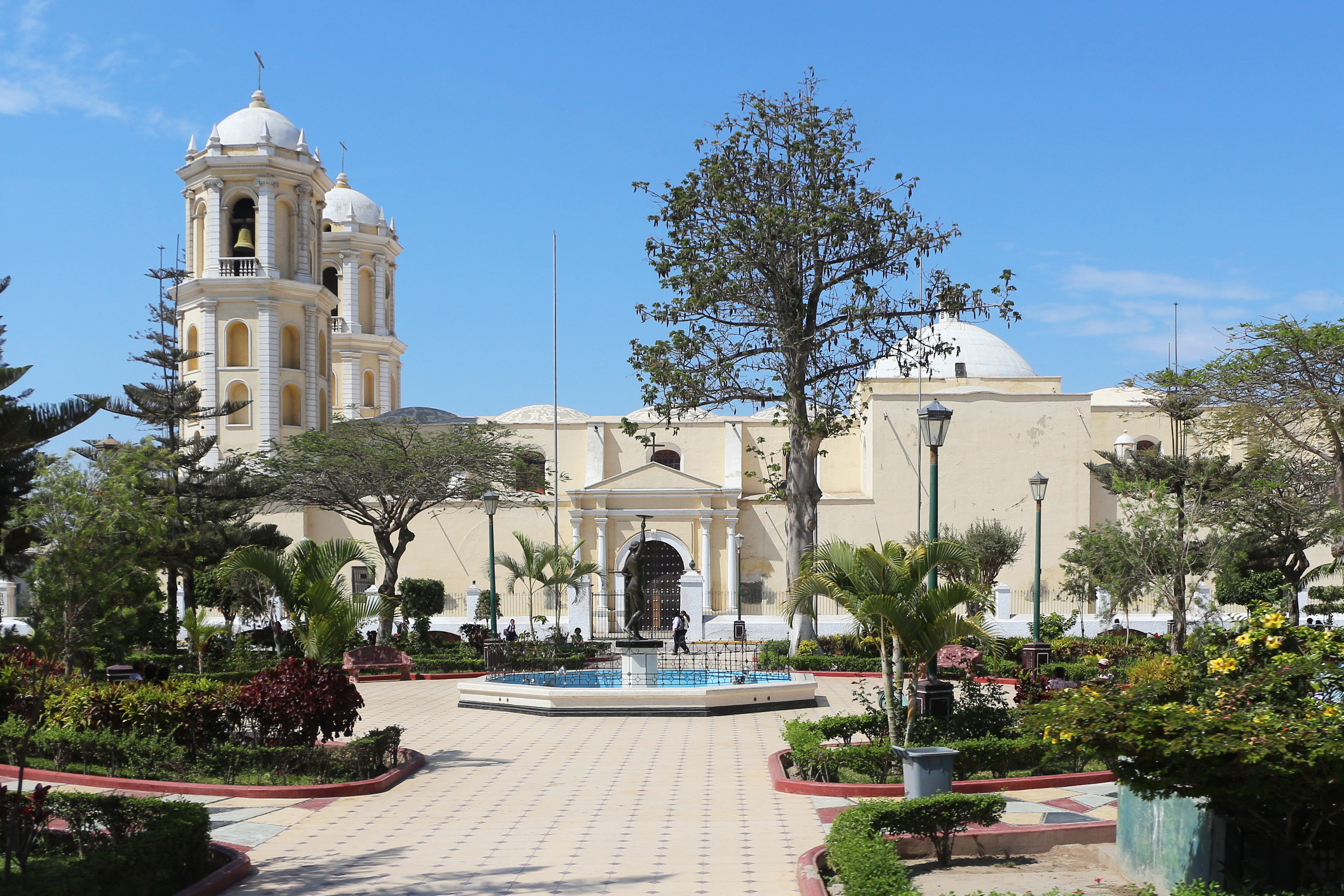
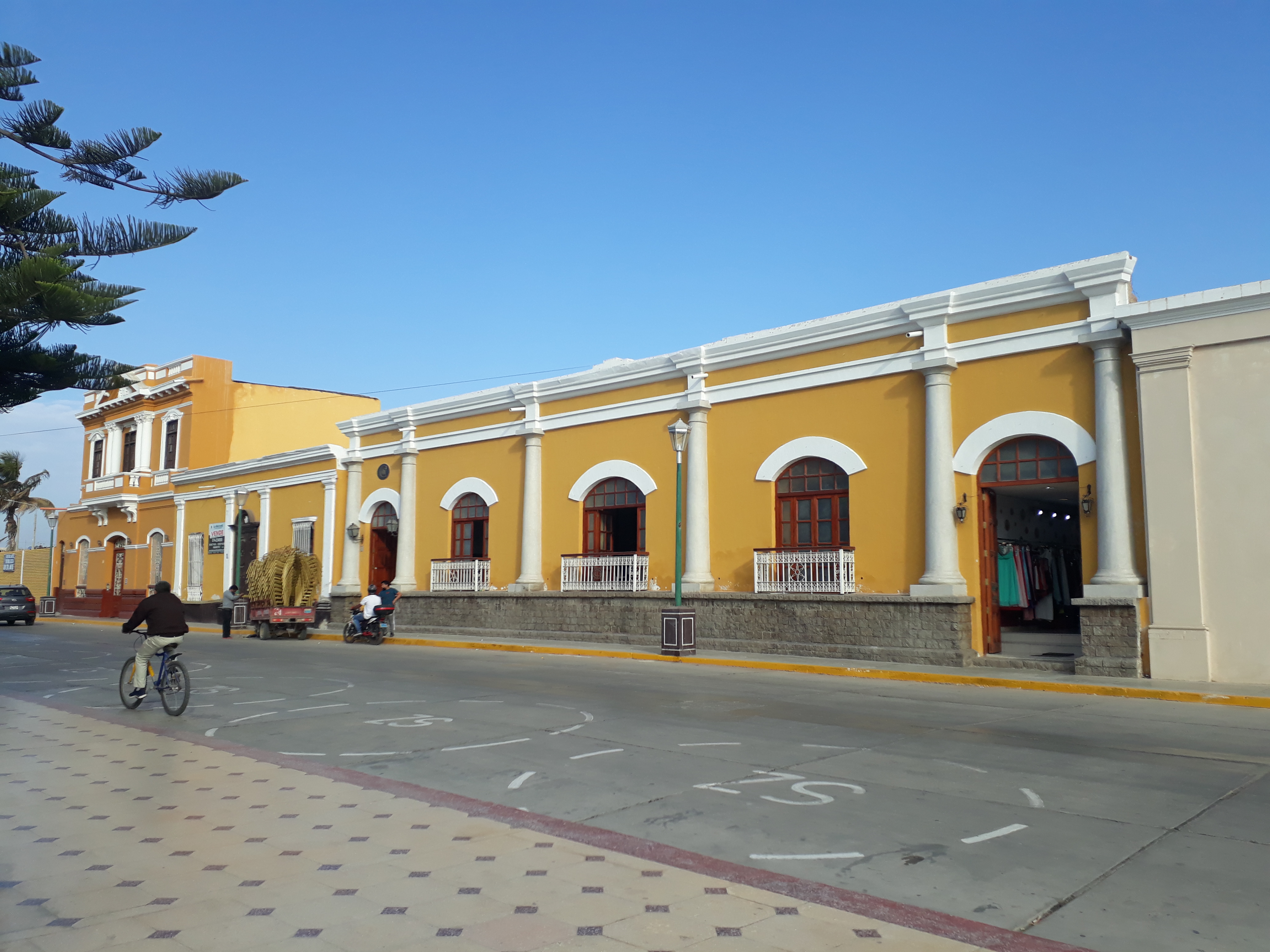
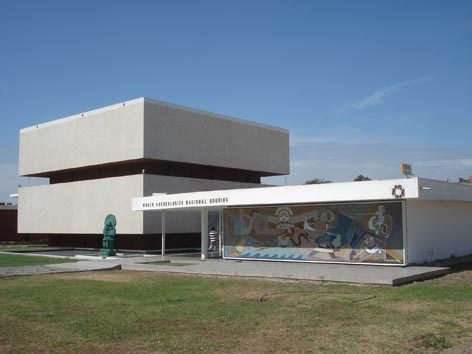
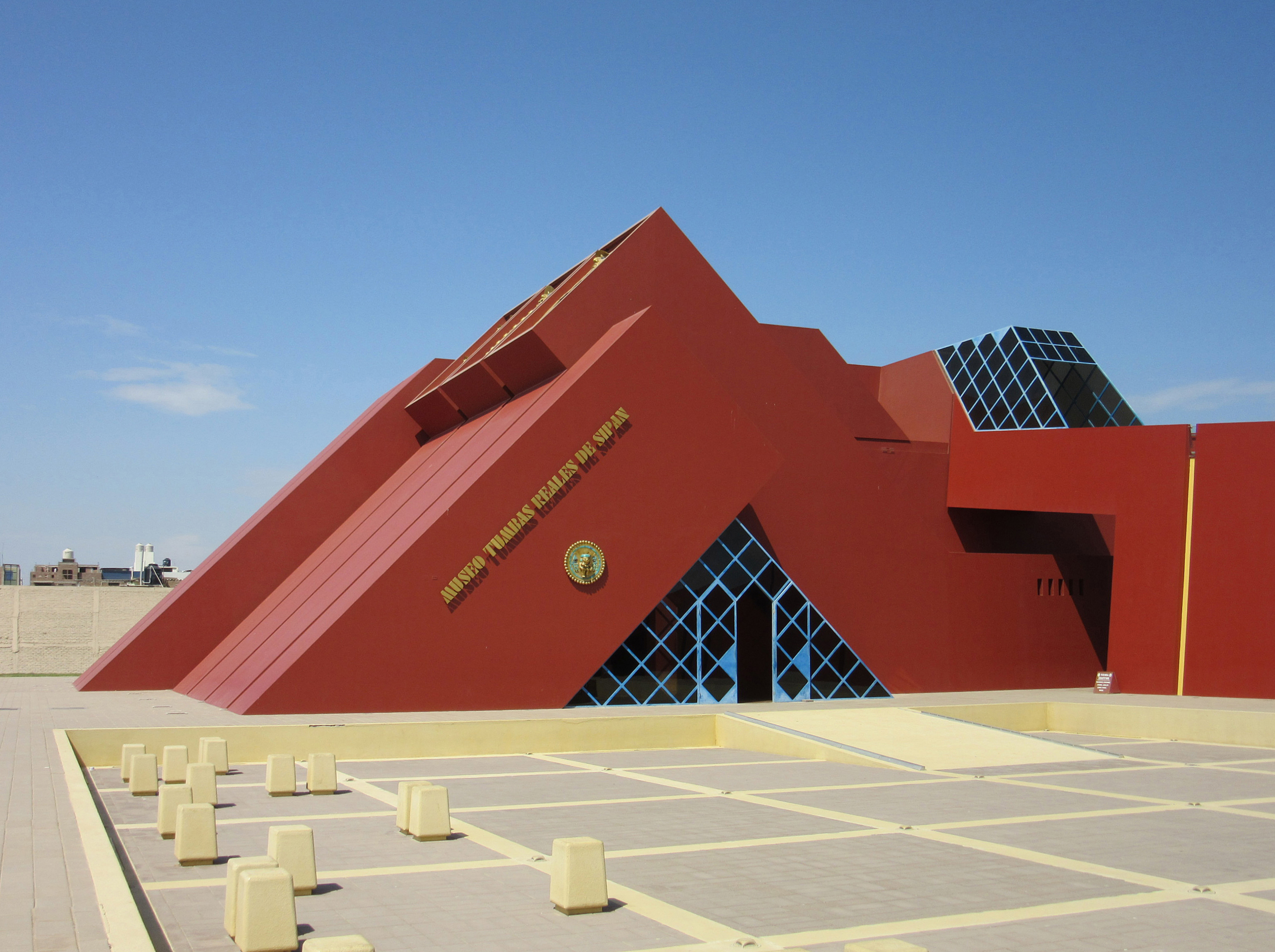
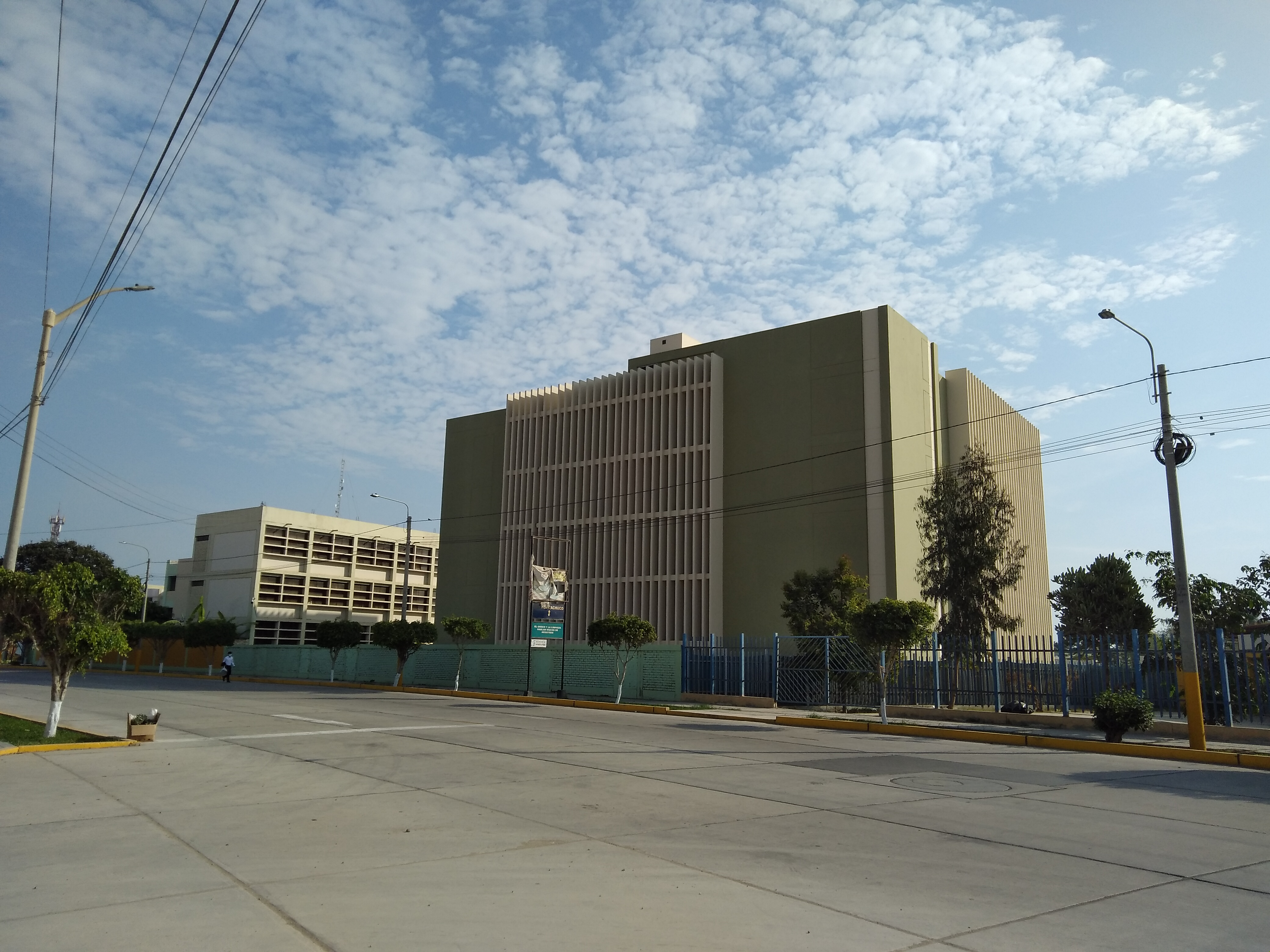
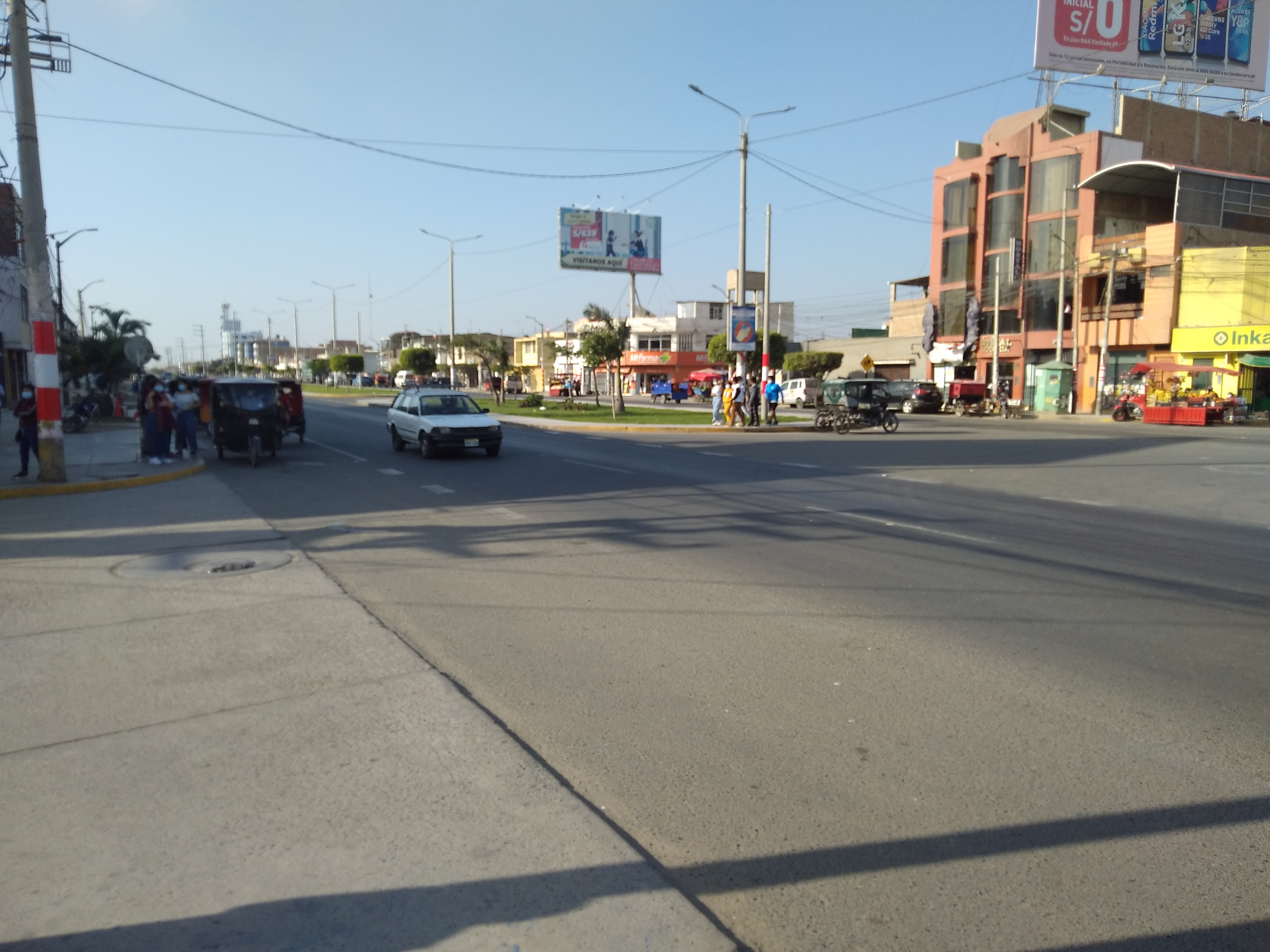

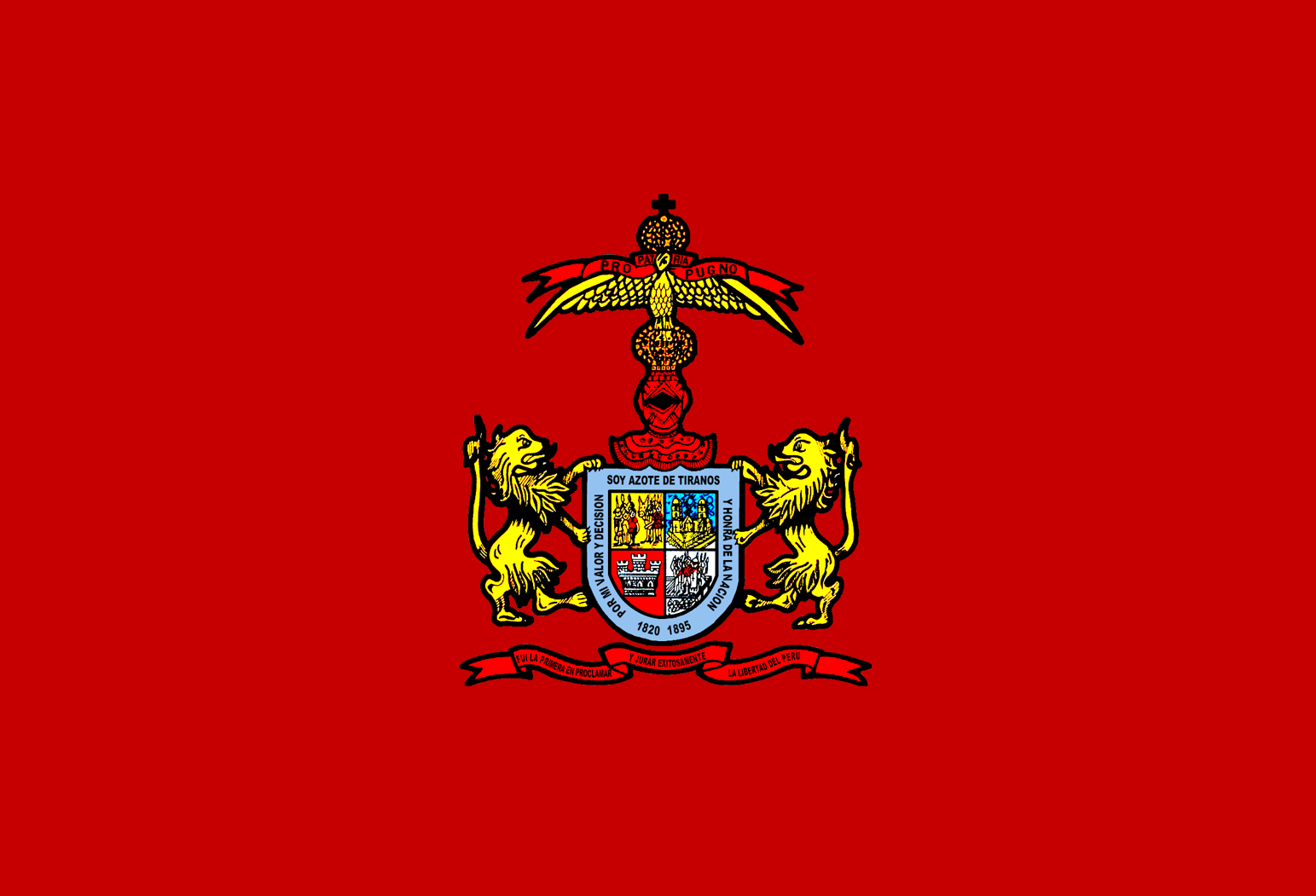
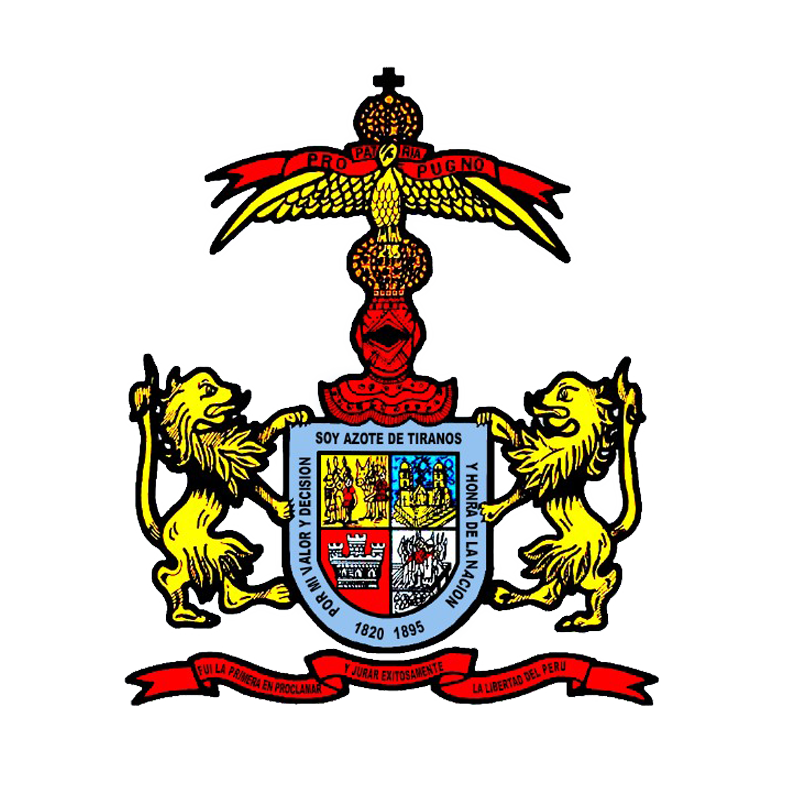
- Flag Seal
- Nicknames: Ciudad Generosa y Benemérita [Generous and Meritorius City], Ciudad Evocadora [Evocative city] and Cuna de la Libertad del Perú [Cradle of Peruvian liberty]
- Motto: Pro Patria Pugno (Latin for "I fight for my fatherland").
- Interactive map of Lambayeque
- Location within Peru
- Coordinates: 6.699651°S 79.902088°W
- Country: Peru
- Region: Lambayeque
- Province: Lambayeque
- District: Lambayeque

Government
  - Mayor: Percy Ramos Puelles

Area
  - Total: 6.211 km^{2} (2.398 sq mi)
- Elevation: 18 m (59 ft)

Population (2017)
  - Total: 58,276
  - Estimate (2015): 47,082
  - Density: 9,383/km^{2} (24,300/sq mi)
- Demonym: lambayecano/a
- Time zone: UTC-5 (PET)
- Postal code: 14013
- Area code: 074
- Website: Municipalidad de Lambayeque

Lambayeque (Mochica: Ñampaxllæc) is a city on the coast of northern Peru and capital of the homonymous district and province in the department of Lambayeque. It is located 4.7 km from the city of Chiclayo and 13 km from the Pacific Ocean. It is an important cultural and educational center of the department as it houses some of the most important museums in the country, such as the Royal Tombs Museum and the Brüning Museum. It was founded in 1553 under the name of San Pedro de Lambayeque by order of the Viceroy Conde de Nieva.

== Toponymy and etymology ==
Situated in the heart of the Mochica-speaking region, the toponym clearly originates from this language. In the colonial grammar of 1644, Fernando de la Carrera—the parish vicar of Reque, who notes in his prologue that he learned the tongue during his childhood in that locality—records the name as <Ñampaxllæc>. This spelling includes the characters <xll> and <æ>, the original pronunciations of which remain a subject of debate among specialists. For instance, linguist Alfredo Torero reconstructed the pronunciation as [ɲampa𝼆ʉk], whereas Rita Eloranta proposes [ɲampaɬɨk].

More than two centuries after Carrera, German researchers Ernst Middendorf, Walter Lehmann, and Hans Heinrich Brüning transcribed the contemporary Mochica pronunciations of the name. Lehmann and Middendorf recorded <Ñampajek ~ Ñanpajek> [ɲampajek], while Brüning noted <nyampášik ~ ñampášek ~ nyampášk> [ɲampaʃ(ɪ)k]. Meanwhile, in Spanish, the toponym appeared as early as the 16th century with an initial "L," varying between <Lanbayeque ~ Lambaieque ~ Lambayeque> (reflecting the same pronunciation used today).

Various etymological theories have been proposed for the name Lambayeque. Suggested roots include ñam ("smoke"; Brüning, Jorge Zevallos Quiñones), allæc ("lord" or curaca; Zevallos Quiñones), pallæc ("lima bean" or Phaseolus lunatus; Torero, Cerrón-Palomino), or <pášek> ("vessel for serving chicha"; Brüning). However, the most widely accepted connection among both laypeople and specialists links the toponym to <Yampallec> or <Yanpallec>, the name of a green stone idol mentioned by Spanish chronicler Miguel Cabello de Balboa in his Miscelánea Antártica (1586).

Consequently, written records indicate a variation in the initial segment of the name between a palatal nasal [ñ], a lateral alveolar approximant [l], and a yod [y]. Building on this link between the toponym and the idol's name, Eloranta subsequently postulated an analysis based on the Mochica verb paxll- ("to become"). Thus, <Ñampaxllæc> would be analyzed as: {ñaiñ_paxll-æc} (Literally: "bird_become-agentive nominalizer"), meaning "the one who turns into a bird".

== History ==
In January 2022, two people were killed in Lambayeque, where the tsunami caused by the eruption of Hunga Tonga–Hunga Ha'apai measured 2 metres (6 ft 7 in).

== Geography ==
The vast plains of Túcume are part of the Lambayeque Valley, the largest valley of the north coast of Peru. The Lambayeque Valley is the site of natural and man-made waterways and is also a region of about 250 decaying and heavily eroded mud-brick pyramids.

=== Climate ===
Lambayeque has a hot desert climate (Köppen: BWh) characterized by warm temperatures throughout the year and extremely low precipitation.

December through May marks the hotter part of the year. February, the hottest month, averages daily highs of 29.5 °C (85.1 °F) and daily lows of 21.6 °C (70.9 °F).

June to November marks the cooler half of the year, with mild temperatures and negligible rainfall. August, the coolest month, averages daily highs of 22.8 °C (73.0 °F) and daily lows of 15.9 °C (60.6 °F).

Climate data for Lambayeque (1991–2020)
Month	Jan	Feb	Mar	Apr	May	Jun	Jul	Aug	Sep	Oct	Nov	Dec	Year
Mean daily maximum °C (°F)	28.5 (83.3)	29.5 (85.1)	29.2 (84.6)	27.8 (82.0)	25.8 (78.4)	24.1 (75.4)	23.1 (73.6)	22.8 (73.0)	23.2 (73.8)	23.8 (74.8)	24.7 (76.5)	26.5 (79.7)	25.8 (78.4)
Mean daily minimum °C (°F)	20.3 (68.5)	21.6 (70.9)	21.4 (70.5)	19.9 (67.8)	18.5 (65.3)	17.4 (63.3)	16.3 (61.3)	15.9 (60.6)	16.0 (60.8)	16.3 (61.3)	16.9 (62.4)	18.4 (65.1)	18.2 (64.8)
Average precipitation mm (inches)	2.7 (0.11)	11.4 (0.45)	17.6 (0.69)	3.5 (0.14)	0.6 (0.02)	0.4 (0.02)	0.1 (0.00)	0.0 (0.0)	0.5 (0.02)	0.8 (0.03)	1.2 (0.05)	2.4 (0.09)	41.2 (1.62)
Source: NOAA

== Archaeology ==
The Brüning Museum, established in the early 20th century, contains hundreds of gold and silver pieces, as well as textiles and ceramics, from the Vicus, Moche, Chimú, Lambeyeque and Inca cultures. The Tumba Real (Royal Tombs of Sipán Museum), established in 2002, contains artefacts from the Moche tombs of the Lord of Sipan, of which fourteen have been excavated.

Dating from around 2000 BC, the Ventarron temple is one of the oldest found in the Americas, as reported by the Peruvian archeologist Walter Alva.

== Culture ==
Lambayeque is also the home of King Kong milk candy, a popular dessert with filling made of fresh milk, pineapple sweets and sometimes peanut.

The region is also known for alfajores.
