= Lord of Sipán =

Moche mummy found in Huaca Rajada, Sipán, Peru

Coordinates: 6.7050°S 79.8995°W

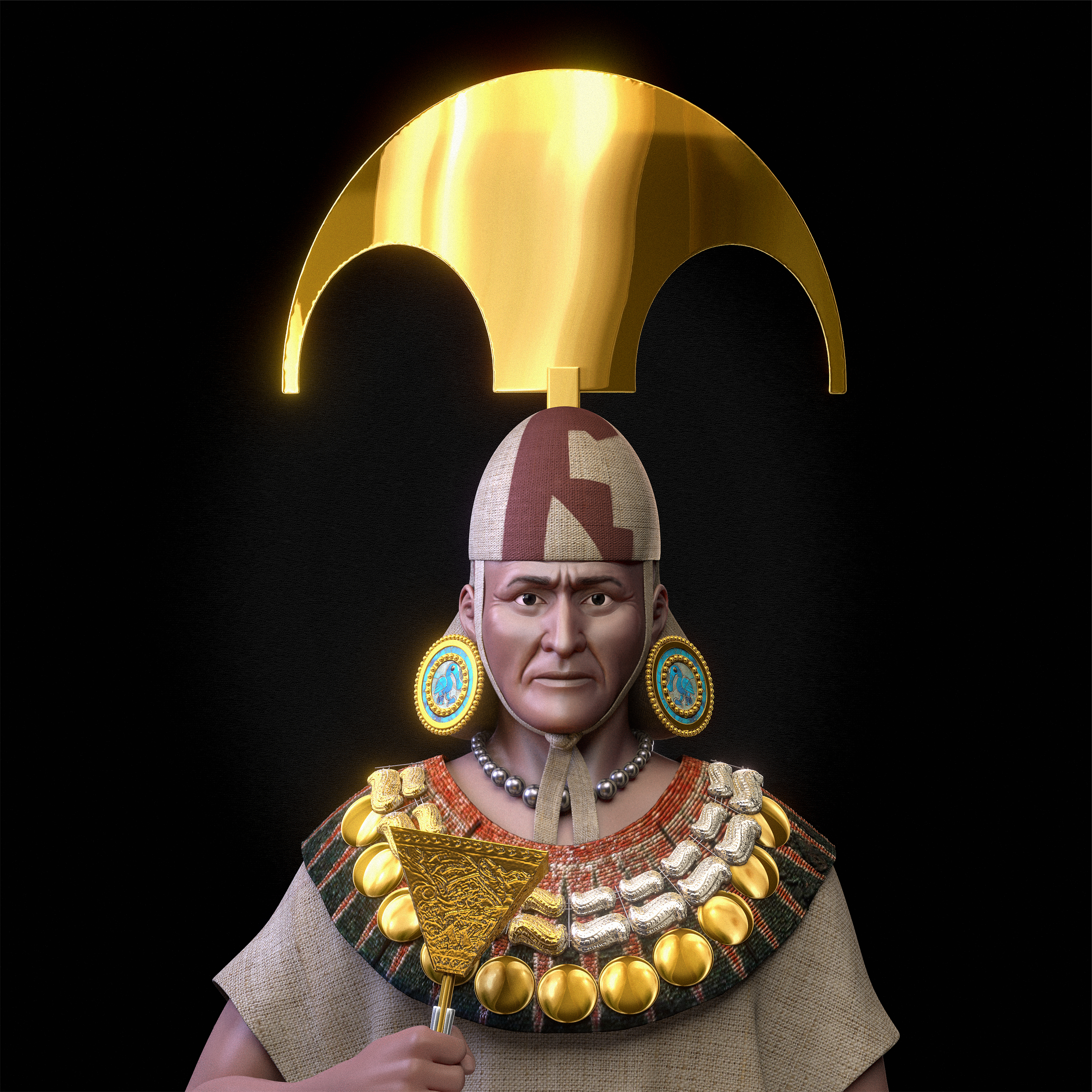
Forensic facial reconstruction of Lord of Sipán

The Lord of Sipán (El Señor de Sipán) is the name given to the first of several Moche mummies found at Huaca Rajada, Sipán, Peru by archaeologist Walter Alva. The site was discovered in 1987.

Some archaeologists consider this find to be one of the most important archaeological discoveries in South America in the last few decades of the 20th century, as the main tomb was found intact and untouched by thieves. By 2007, fourteen tombs had been located and identified at Huaca Rajada.

The Royal Tombs of Sipán Museum was constructed nearby Lambayeque to hold most of the artifacts and interpret the tombs. It opened in 2002 and Dr. Alva is director.

== Location ==
The Moche tombs at Huaca Rajada are located near the town of Sipán in the middle of the Lambayeque Valley. Sipán is in the Zaña district in the northern part of Peru. Close to the coast, it is about 20 miles east of the city of Chiclayo and about 30 miles away from Lambayeque.

== Huaca Rajada ==
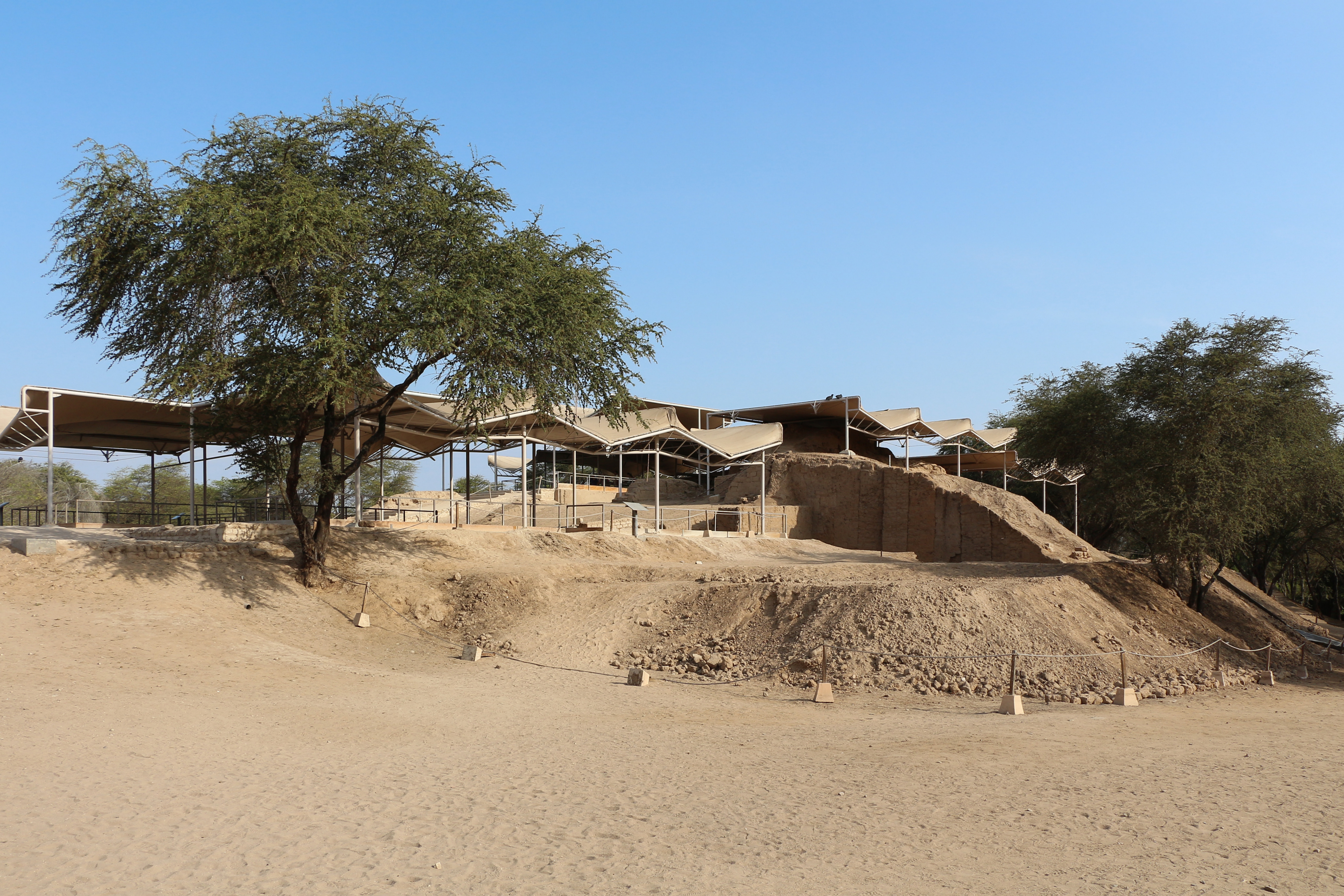
Site of Huaca Rajada

Huacas like Huaca Rajada were built by the Moche and other South American cultures as monuments. The Huaca Rajada monument consists of two small adobe pyramids plus a low platform. The platform and one of the pyramids were built before 300 AD by the Moche; the second pyramid at Huaca Rajada was built about 700 AD by a later culture. Many huacas were looted by the Spanish during and after the Spanish conquest of the Inca Empire; the looting of huacas continues to be a problem in many locations.

In early 1987, looters digging at Huaca Rajada found several objects made of gold. A disagreement among the looters caused the find to be reported to the local police. The police raided the site, recovered a number of items, and alerted Dr. Alva.

== Lord of Sipán ==
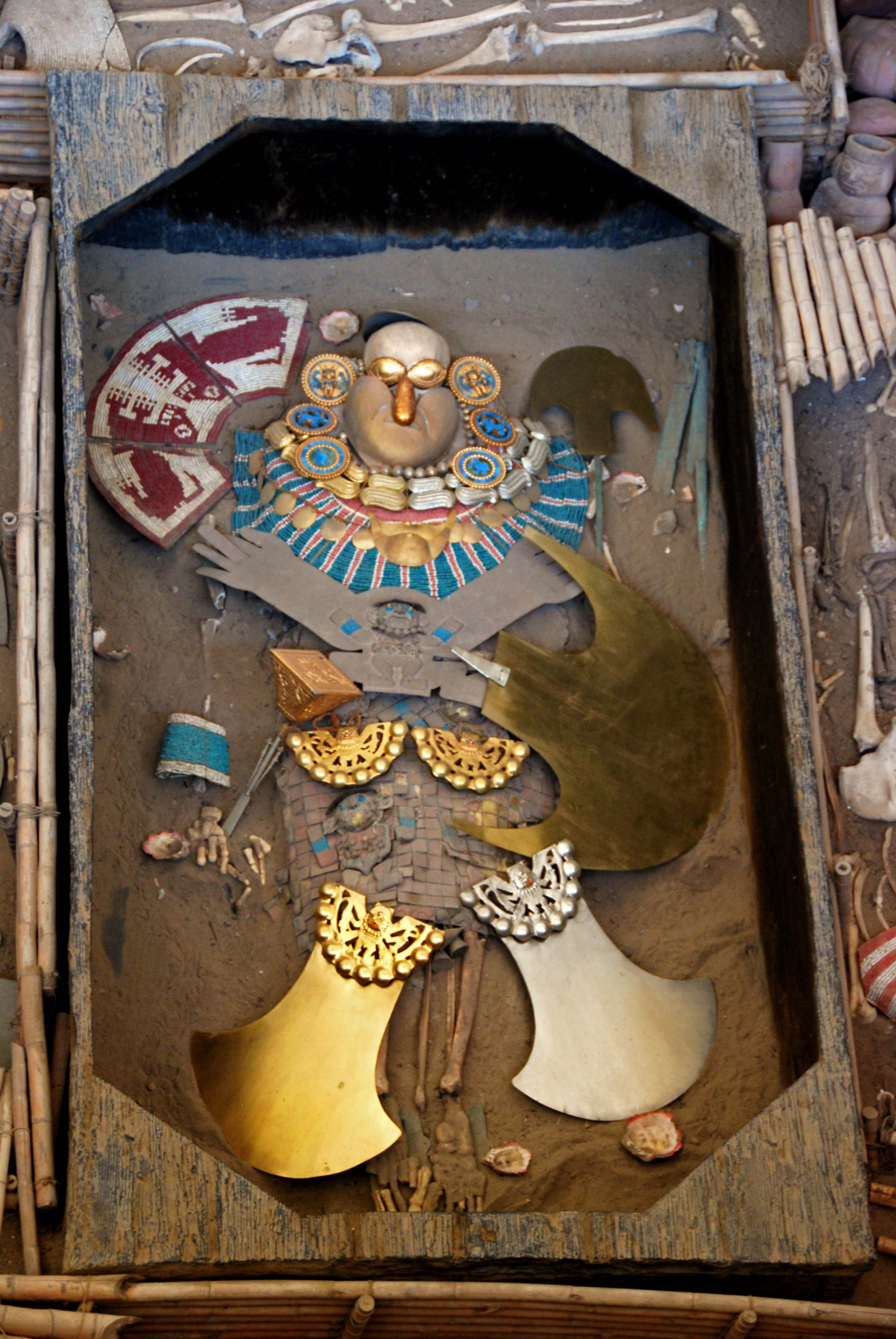
El Señor de Sipán, original artifacts in the Royal Tombs of Sipán museum, Lambayeque, Peru

Scientific analysis of the skeleton of the Lord of Sipán shows that he was approximately 1.63 meters tall and was about 35–45 years old at the time of his death. His jewelry and ornaments, which included headdresses, a face mask, a pectoral, (the pectoral was gold and had the head of a man and the body of an octopus) necklaces, nose rings, earrings and other items, indicate he was of the highest rank. Most of the ornaments were made of gold, silver, copper and semi-precious stones.

The Lord of Sipán was wearing two necklaces with beads of gold and silver in the shape of peanuts, which represent the earth. The peanuts symbolized that men came from the land, and that when they die, they return to the earth. Peanuts were used because they were an important food crop for the Moche. The necklaces had ten kernels on the right side made of gold, signifying masculinity and the sun god, and ten kernels on the left side made of silver, to represent femininity and the moon god.

Buried with the Lord of Sipán were six other people: three young women (possibly wives or concubines who had apparently died some time earlier), two males (probably warriors), and a child of about nine or ten. The remains of a third male (possibly also a warrior) was found on the roof of the burial chamber sitting in a niche overlooking the chamber. There was also a dog. The warriors who were buried with the Lord of Sipán had amputated feet, as if to prevent them from leaving the tomb. The women were dressed in ceremonial clothes. In addition to the people, archeologists found in the tomb a total of 451 ceremonial items and offerings (burial goods), and the remains of several animals, including a dog and two llamas.

== Other Sipán mummies ==
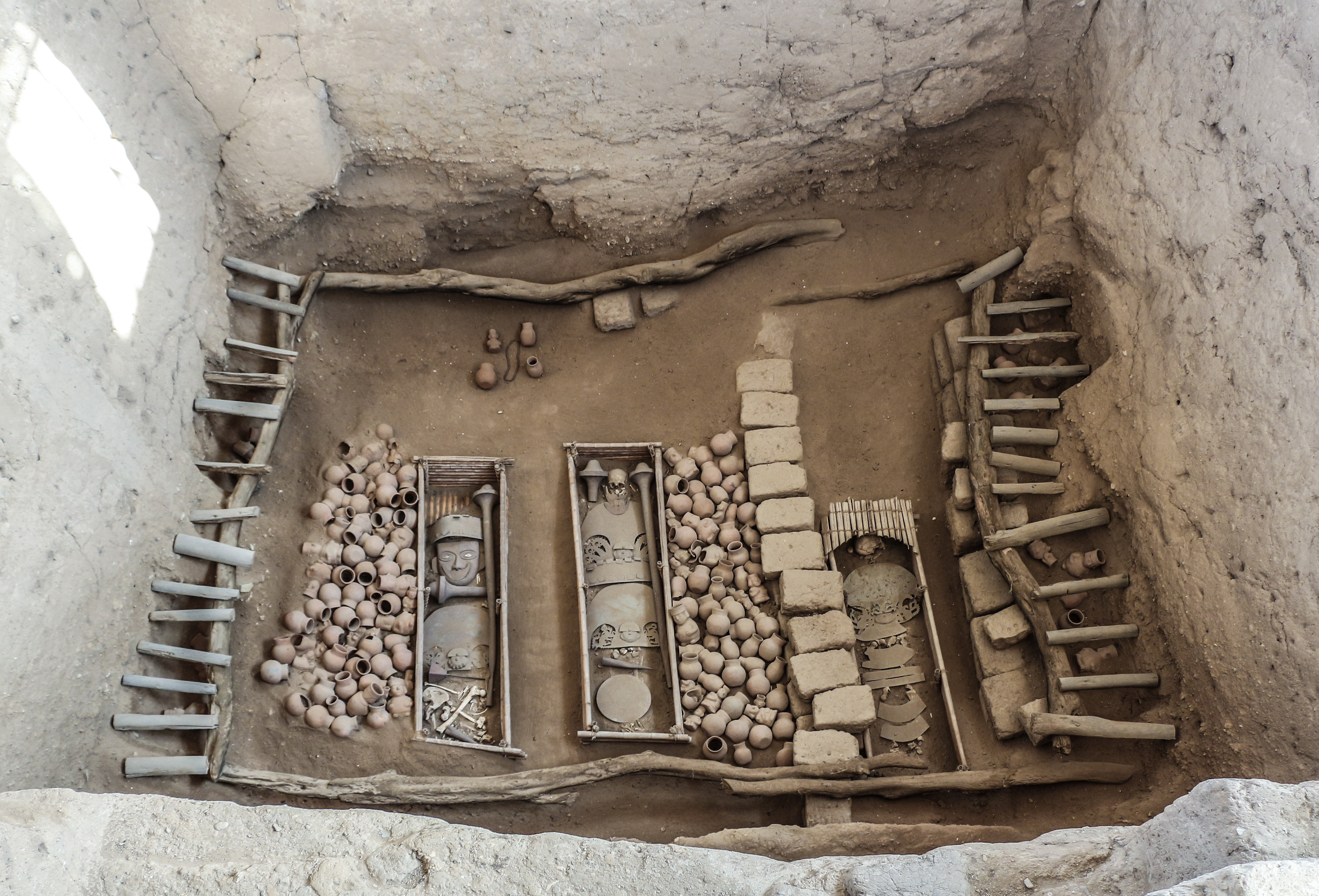
Tomb of the Warriors, Huaca Rajada

In 1988, a second tomb was found and excavated near that of the Lord of Sipán. Artifacts in this second tomb are believed to be related to religion: a cup or bowl for the sacrifices, a metal crown adorned with an owl with its wings extended, and other items associated with worship of the moon. Alva concluded that the individual buried in this tomb was a Moche priest. Carbon dating established that the skeleton in this second tomb was contemporary with the Lord of Sipan.

The third tomb found at Huaca Rajada was slightly older than the first two, but ornaments and other items found in the tomb indicated that the person buried in the tomb was of the same high rank as the first Lord of Sipán burial. DNA analysis of the remains in this third tomb established that the individual buried in the third tomb was related to the Lord of Sipán via the maternal line. As a result, the archeologists named this third individual The Old Lord of Sipán. The third tomb also contained the remains of two other people: a young woman, a likely sacrifice to accompany the Old Lord of Sipán to the next life; and a man with amputated feet, possibly sacrificed to be the Old Lord's guardian in the afterlife.

A total of fourteen tombs have been found at Sipán.

== DNA testing ==
Archeological research and DNA testing enabled deducing certain physical characteristics of the ruler, such as skin color, the form of his lips, hair, eyes and other facial features. It was also possible to provide an accurate estimate of his age at death, allowing for a more accurate facial reconstruction by researchers.

== Museum ==
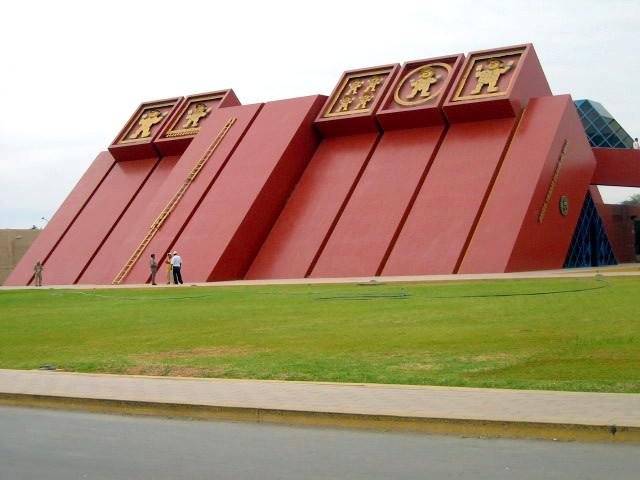
The Royal Tombs Museum of Sipán

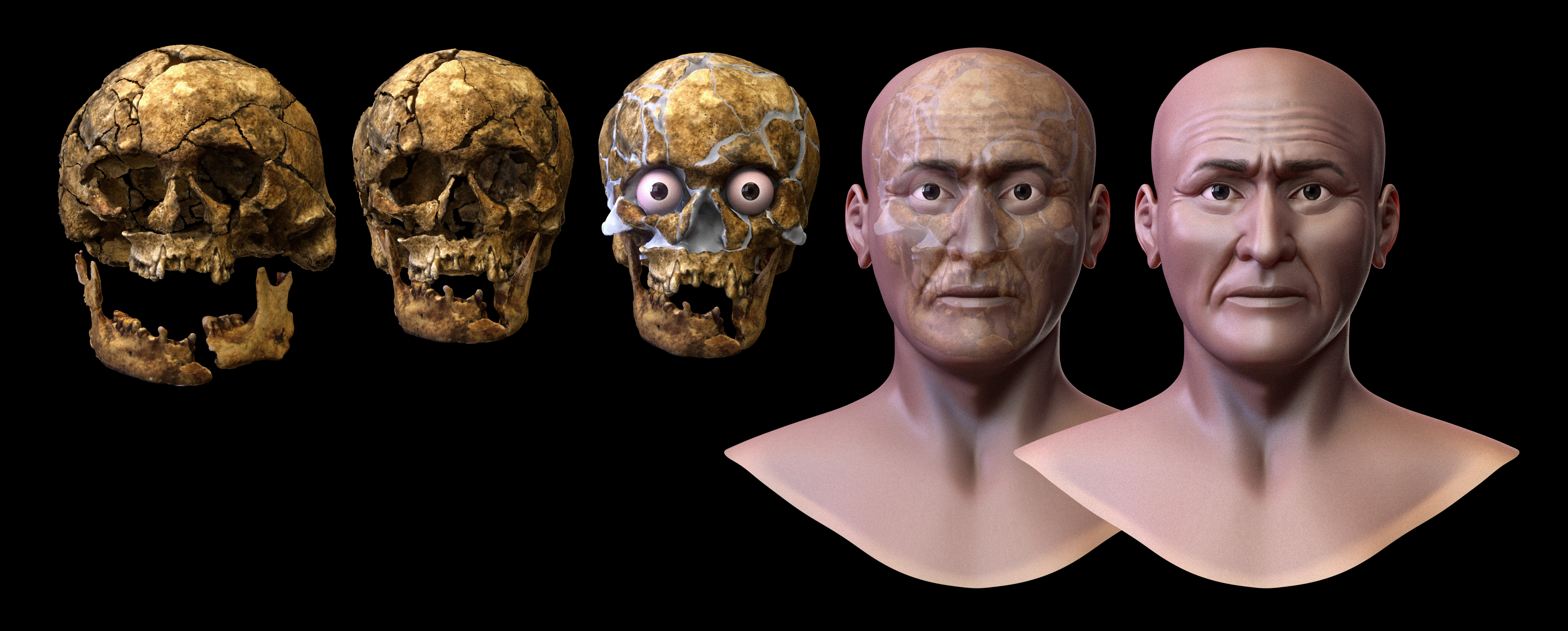
Steps of digital forensic facial reconstruction of Lord of Sipán.

The Royal Tombs of Sipán Museum, located in nearby Lambayeque, contains most of the important artifacts found at Huaca Rajada, including the Lord of Sipán and his entourage. Dr. Alva helped found and support construction of the museum, which opened in 2002. The museum was designed to resemble the ancient Moche tombs. He has been appointed as director of the museum. In 2009 a smaller museum was opened at the site of Huaca Rajada.
