= Izumi Shimada =

American anthropologist

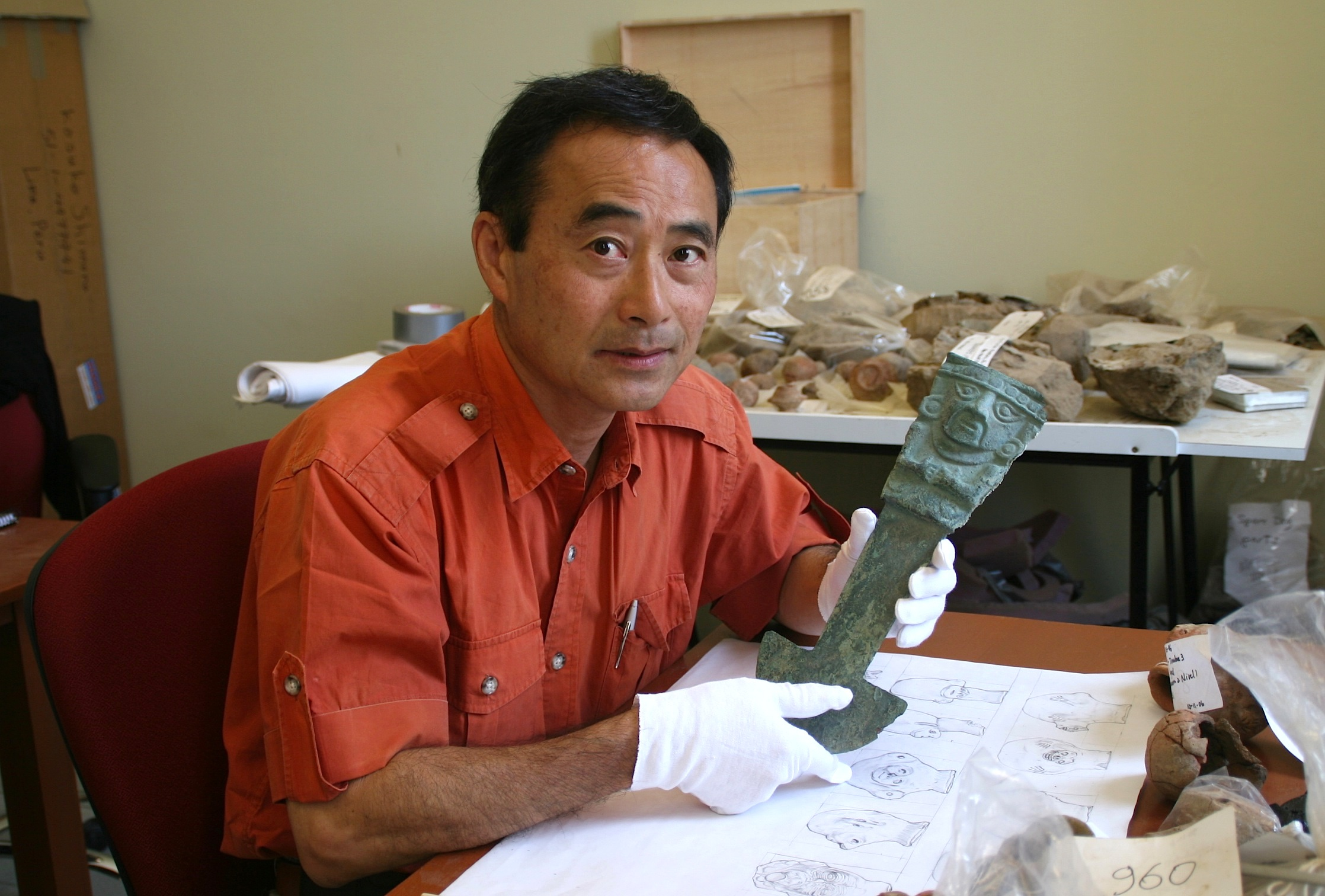
Professor Izumi Shimada holding tumi knife excavated at Huaca Loro in 2006

Izumi Shimada (島田泉) is a Distinguished Professor of Anthropology at Southern Illinois University, Carbondale (SIUC) and 2007 Outstanding Scholar with research interests in the archaeology of complex pre-Hispanic cultures in the Andes including Inca civilization, the technology and organization of craft production, mortuary analysis, experimental archaeology, the role of ideology and organized religion in cultural developments, and ecology-culture interaction.

Born in Kyoto, Japan in 1948, Shimada moved at the age of 16 with his parents to the U.S. in 1964. He majored in anthropology at Cornell (B.A. 1971) where he became interested in the ancient Andean civilization and experimental archaeology under tutelage of Prof. John V. Murra and Robert Ascher, respectively. Two seasons (1973, 1975) of archaeological fieldwork at the Moche city of Pampa Grande (c. AD 600–750) on the northern coast of Peru led to his doctorate in anthropology from the University of Arizona in 1976.

In 2019, the Emperor of Japan, Naruhito, conferred upon Shimada the "Order of the Sacred Treasure," an award created in 1888 that recognizes distinguished achievement.

== Career ==
Since then, Shimada taught at University of Oregon (1977–8), Princeton (1978–1983) and Harvard (1984–1991) before joining the SIUC in 1994.

From 1978 to the present, he has directed the Sicán Archaeological Project, focusing on the developmental processes, technology, religion, and other aspects of the pre-Hispanic Sicán culture (c. AD 800–1400) on the northern coast of Peru. The project results formed the collection foundations of the Sicán National Museum in Ferreñafe, Peru, which opened in 2004. It included the study of metal and metallurgy.

In 2003 Shimada began interdisciplinary investigation into the social foundations and the paleo-environmental context of the famed prehistoric religious center of Pachacamac, outside the city of Lima. The executive government (2003) and the congress (2006) of Peru bestowed him medals of honor for his contribution to Peruvian cultural and historical knowledge and understanding.

He has written 150 journal articles and book chapters, collaborating on many of them with other prominent scholars in the field, including, but not limited to, Kenichi Shinoda and Robert Corruccini. Dr. Shimada has written or edited many books, including the following works:

- Pampa Grande and the Mochica Culture (1994);
- Cultura Sicán (1995);
- Andean Ceramics: Technology, Organization and Approaches (1998);
- Craft Production in Complex Societies (2007)
- editor, The Inka Empire: A Multidisciplinary Approach (2015); Spanish translation, El Imperio Inka (2020)

== Legacy and honors ==
- 2003, national government of Peru awarded him a medal of honor
- 2004, the Sicán National Museum, based on collection from the Shimada-led Sicán Archaeological Project, opened in Ferreñafe, Peru
- 2006, Peruvian Congress awarded a medal of honor to him
- 2019 Order of the Sacred Treasure from the Emperor of Japan

== See also ==
- Sican culture

== Select publications ==
=== Peer-reviewed articles ===
- I. Shimada, K. Shinoda, J. Farnum, R.S. Corruccini, H. Watanabe. 2004. "An Integrated Analysis of Pre-Hispanic Mortuary Practices", Current Anthropology 45:369-402.
- R.S. Corruccini, I. Shimada. 2002a. "Dental Relatedness Corresponding to Mortuary Patterning at Huaca Loro, Peru", in American Journal of Physical Anthropology 117:113-121.
- R.S. Corruccini, I. Shimada, K. Shinoda. 2002b. "Dental and mtDNA Relatedness Among Thousand Year-Old Remains from Huaca Loro, Peru", in Dental Anthropology 16:9-14.
