= Huaca Rajada =

Archaeological site in Peru

- Sipán; Huaca Rajada-Sipán
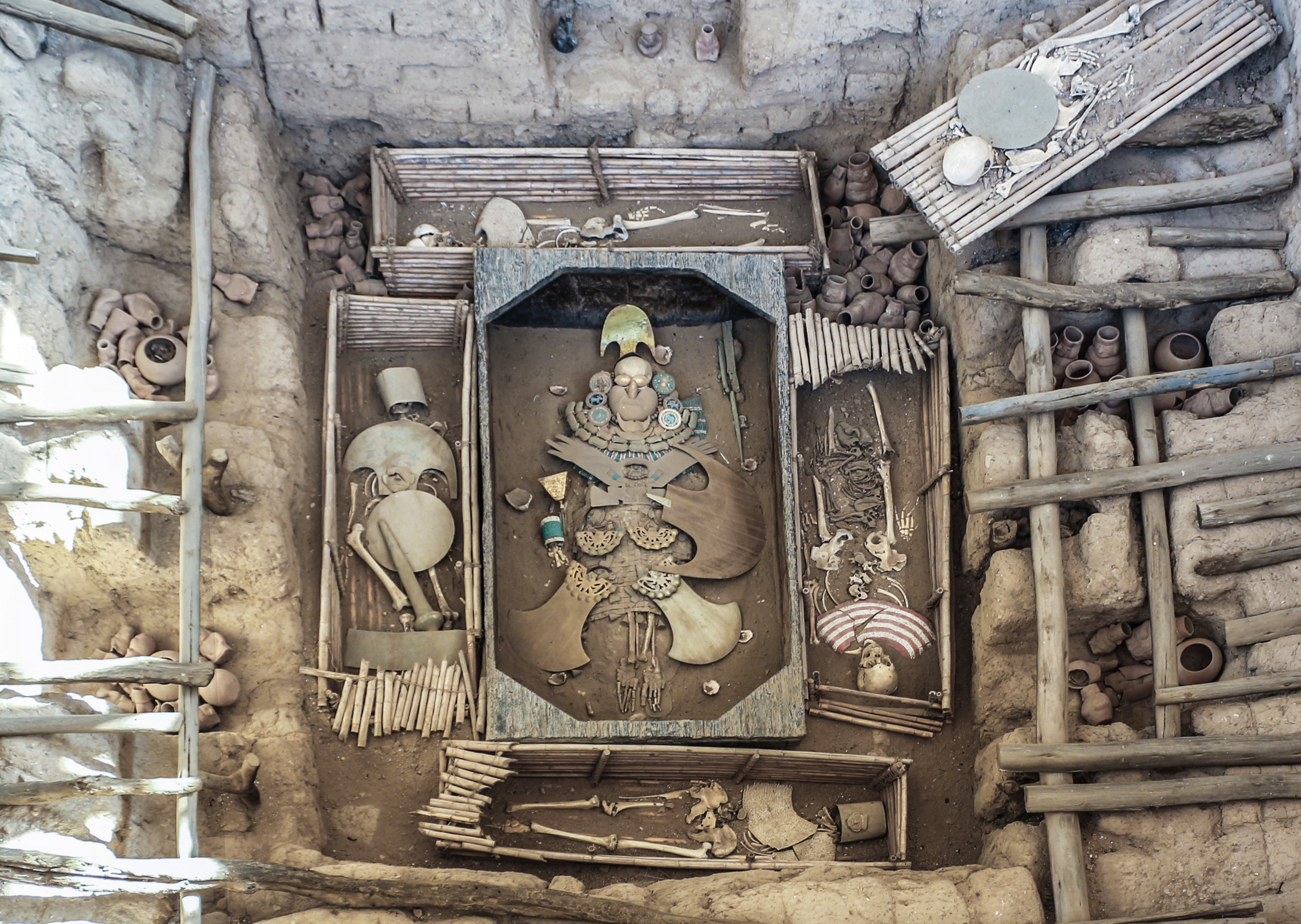
- Lord of Sipán, original artifacts in the Royal Tombs of Sipán museum, Lambayeque, Peru

- Location within Peru Location within South America
- Interactive map of Huaca Rajada
- 6°48′05″S 79°36′08″W
- Type: Settlement
- Periods: Early Intermediate
- Cultures: Moche
- Location: Sipán, Zaña District, Chiclayo Province, Lambayeque Region, Peru
- Region: Lambayeque valley (North of Peru)

History
- Built by: Moche culture

Site notes
- Material: Adobe
- Elevation: 83–102 m (272–335 ft)
- Area: 29.5 ha (73 acres)
- Owner: Peruvian Government
- Public access: Yes

Huaca Rajada, also known as Sipán, is a Moche archaeological site in northern Peru in the Lambayeque Valley, that is famous for the tomb of Lord of Sipán (El Señor de Sipán), excavated by Walter Alva and his wife Susana Meneses beginning in 1987. The city of Sipán is dated from 50 to 700 AD, the same time as the Moche Period.

== Significance ==
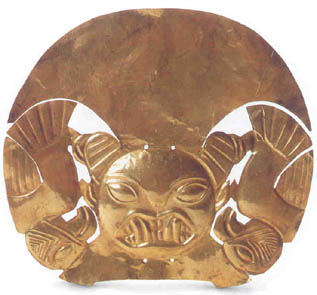
Moche Headdress Larco Museum Collection.

Sipán is an archaeological site where royal tombs were discovered and excavated between 1987 and 1990, a fairly recent find in the last 30 years, and is considered to be a very important archaeological discovery. Many of the tombs were looted, yet the artifacts that remained and were discovered by archaeologists play an important role in understanding the Moche rulers and tradition. Tombs have been found also in Sipán's Huaca Rajada, an area near Chiclayo. The tombs in the area are of adobe construction, of pyramidal shape, and have now shown erosion which could have been exacerbated over time by successive El Niño events. There is very little research on the commoners of Sipán, yet it is well known that the commoners often paid a tax through labor which allowed for the creation of the burial platforms for the Lords of Sipán. These platforms and other adobe structures are often made with marked adobe bricks which tracked this labor in order to pay off taxes. Other than providing labor for the Lord there is very little known specifically about Moche commoners from Sipán.

The tombs of Sipán allowed for archaeologists and anthropologists to get a better understanding of the Sacrifice Ceremony of the Sipán rulers that had been illustrated on murals, ceramics, and other decorative goods. The Sacrifice Ceremonies were often depicted with prisoners among gods or royalty. The tombs at Sipán showed that rulers actually took part in such Sacrifice Ceremonies when looking at the artifacts uncovered including: adornments and a headdress that matched the illustrations of the ceremony along with large knives and tools that would have been used for bloodletting and decapitation.

== Looting ==
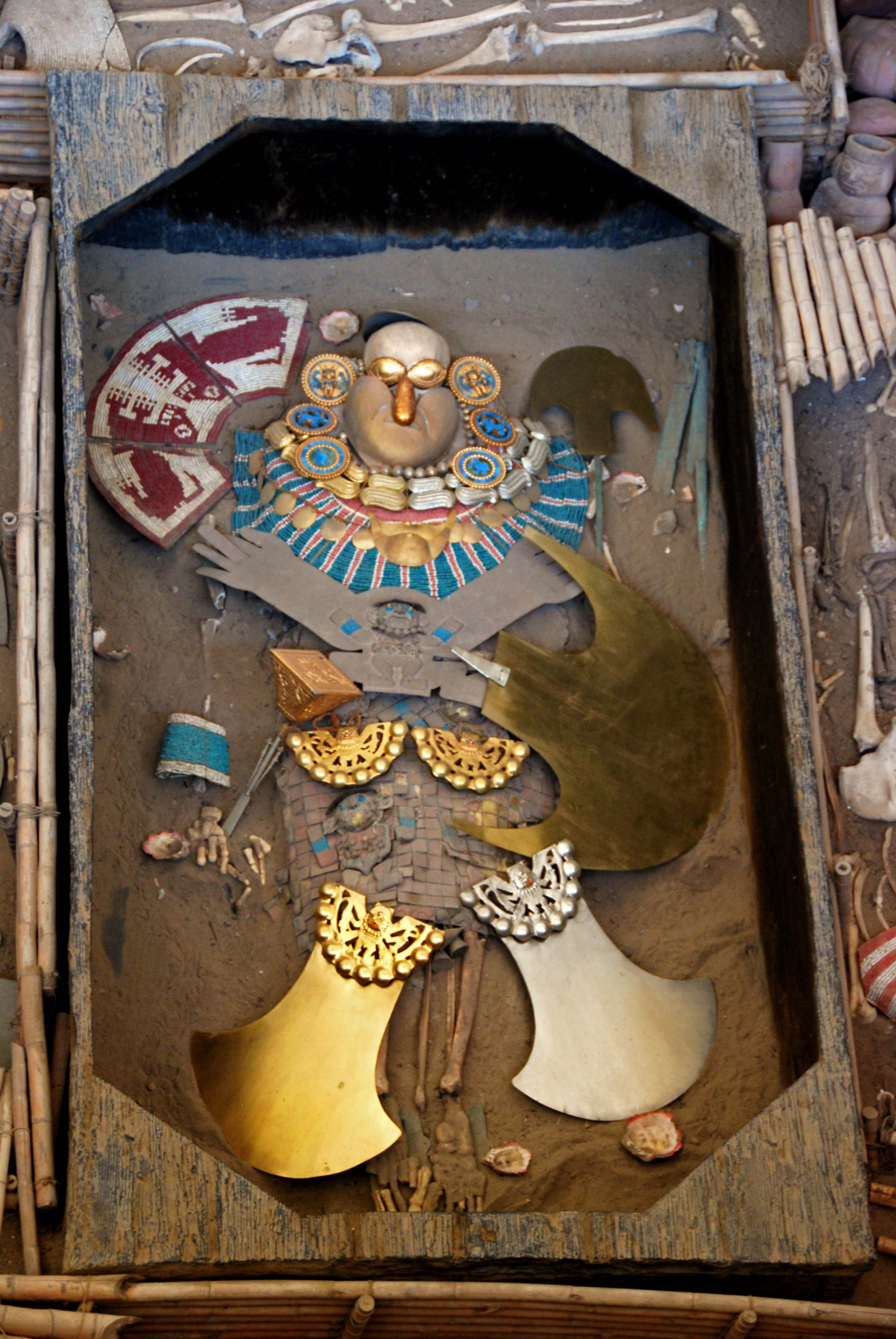
Reconstruction of the tomb of the Lord of Sipán, Huaca Rajada

In February 1987, a man by the name of Ernil Bernal led a band of huaqueros (tomb looters) who tunneled into one of the pyramids located at Huaca Rajada. Over the next few nights, they took a large number of valuable metal objects, destroying hundreds of ceramics and human remains in the process. Untold numbers of artifacts were lost, sold for profit to private collections on the black market. Alva arrived with the police a day or more later, after an exceedingly ornate mask had been confiscated from the huaqueros stash house and presented to the researcher. There are a number of accounts from the events taking place upon the arrival of Alva and the police, however it is clear that they were able to drive the huaqueros away from the site, erect fences around the tombs, and begin excavation. Thereafter Alva and his team excavated 12 more tombs while villagers and huaqueros threw rocks and taunted them in an attempt to get the researchers out of the site and allow the looting to continue. The villagers were unsuccessful, however, as Alva completed his work which became the foundation of the "Royal Tombs of Sipán" discussed below.

== Metalwork ==
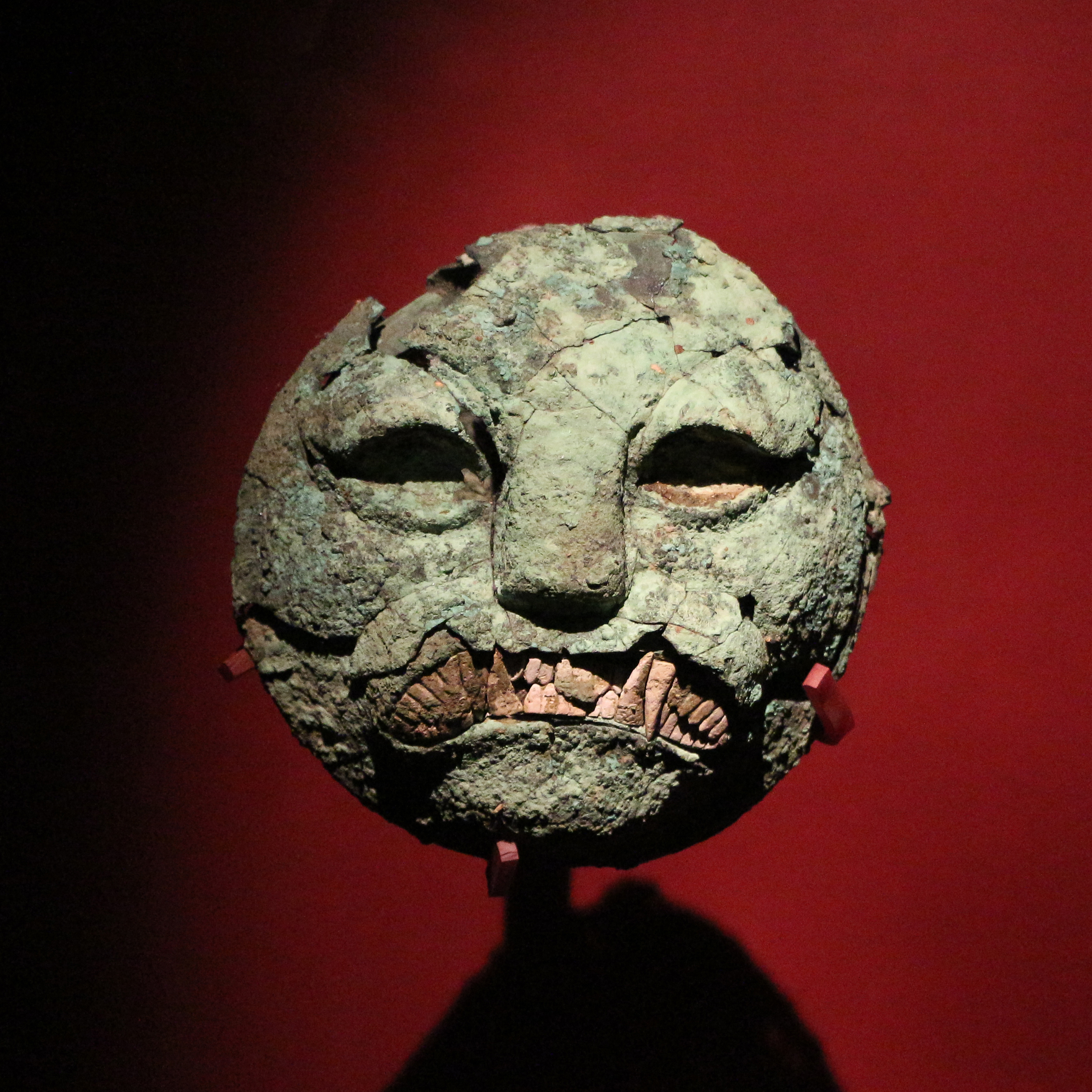
funerary mask in Huaca Rajada.

During the excavations in 1987–1990, a spectacular treasure of gold and silver ornamental and ceremonial artifacts was recovered, dating to AD 50–300. These objects demonstrate the outstanding craftsmanship of the Moche metalsmiths through their use of elaborate and advanced metalworking techniques. Moche smiths made these artifacts out of thin sheets of copper alloys, using electrochemical processes to purify an extremely thin (0.5–2.0 μm) layers of gold or silver coating.

To make the artifacts, copper ingots were hammered into sheet metal and formed into the desired shape (e.g. a mask). While the exact method for adding the gold film to the outside is not known, one well-accepted theory is that gold was likely dissolved in aqueous solutions of corrosive compounds recovered from the Northern Peruvian deserts and brought to a low boil, after which the copper sheet was dipped in resulting in the reaction:

2Au^{3+} + 3Cu ⇌ 2Au^{0} + 3Cu^{2+}

thereby dissolving copper and depositing gold on the surface of the metal. The sheet is then heated to between 500 and 800_{o}C, allowing the gold film to permanently bond to the surface. These gold films were not pure gold, but have been found to be of gold-copper-silver solutions (ex. Cu_{28}Au_{2}Ag).

Some of the silver artifacts (namely individually made head-shaped beads, about 4.0 cm by 5.1 cm) were formed by alternating between hammering and annealing copper-silver alloy (Cu_{18}Ag_{1}Au) resulting in copper-oxide forming along the surface which can be removed using an acid (plant juices) or base (stale urine that has turned to ammonia). After many repetitions, the copper will be depleted resulting in the appearance of pure silver (in actuality silver only makes up 18% of the surface). Other silver artifacts are believed to have been made in roughly the same manner, but contain as much as 90% silver on the surface

Examples of metalwork found in Sipán include the above-mentioned head-shaped beads, peanut-shaped beads, coffin straps, fan handles, spearheads, a copper-plated banner, ceremonial knives, golden headdresses, silver and gold nose and ear ornaments, scepters, a gold necklace made of 10 spiderweb beads (spider bodies with human faces sitting on golden wires), a gilded copper animal (possibly fox or dog), among others. The vast majority of these works were placed in richly decorated tombs, indicating both their high value toward the Sipán leadership and the frequent need for artisans to continue to make new artifacts as old ones were buried.

== Museums with artifacts from Sipán ==
=== Museo Tumbas Reales de Sipán ===
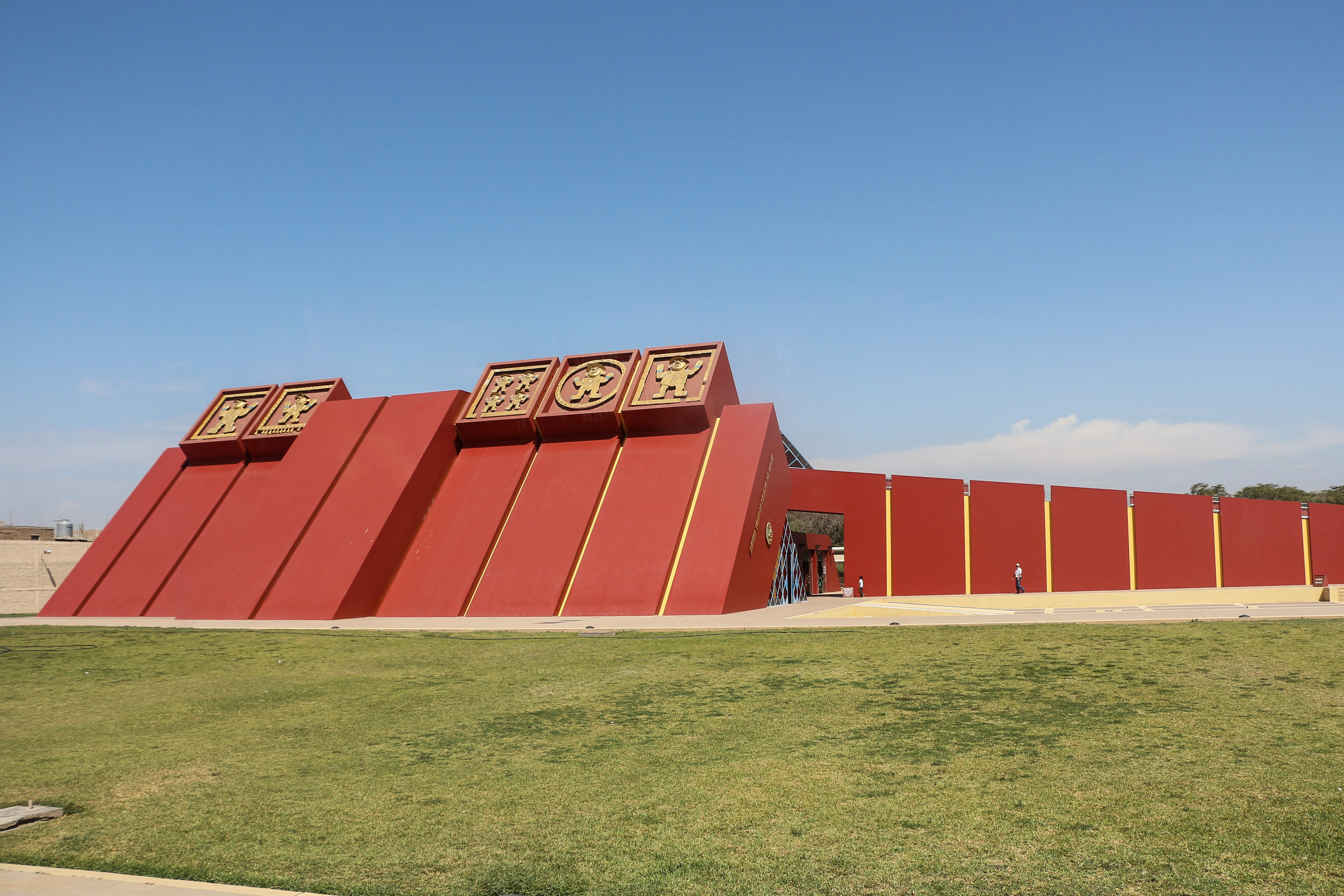
Museo Tumbas Reales de Sipán

- The Museo Tumbas Reales de Sipán, Royal Tombs of Sipán Museum, is located in Lambayeque, Peru and was opened in 2002. This museum specifically focuses on the tomb of the Lord of Sipán found in Sipán in 1987.
- The museum's focus is based on the Lord of Sipán as well as the 8 people sacrificed with him, the Old Lord of Sipán and priest accompanying the Lord.
- The setup of the museum is specific to the way in which the archaeology was conducted with the museum starting on the third floor and moving into lower levels which correlate to the excavation of the tomb.
- The tomb replication is complete with the exact structures from the Lord of Sipán tomb as well as full body adornment of precious metals, jewels, ceramics, wood carvings, and other grave goods.
- See External links for more information on the Museo Tumbas Reales de Sipán.

=== Royal Tombs of Sipán Exhibit by the Fowler Museum of Cultural History ===
- The Royal Tombs of Sipán was a traveling exhibit across the United States from 1993 to 1995.
- The exhibit has rooms separated by their specific location. There are three main rooms that are for tomb 1 (Lord of Sipán as well as the wealthiest tomb), tomb 2 (with very few artifacts), and tomb 3 (the oldest tomb).
- The exhibit has a separate room that contains artifacts that have been recovered from looters. These artifacts are separate from the labeled tomb rooms, because it is not possible to know the exact tomb the artifact was originally taken from.
- Artifacts on Display:
  - Tomb 1 was the richest tomb that included the possessions of the Lord of Sipán. Some of the artifacts on display were: multiple earspools, very large peanut shaped beaded necklaces, 12 feather fans, intricate designs of animals in metalworking, and a mannequin that is wearing all of the Lord of Sipán's burial regalia.
  - Tomb 2 is a much smaller display with only three cases of artifacts. These artifacts include: an owl headdress (created from copper and feathers), and a double stranded necklace where one strand was of human faces smiling and the other was of human faces grimacing.
  - Tomb 3 is the oldest tomb that was a pit burial. This burial was still very elaborate based on its artifacts that include gold jewelry that incorporated human faces and spider webs. Many of the artifacts were poorly preserved and were not on display in the exhibit, but were displayed in catalogs. The poorly preserved artifacts include: gilded animals that had movable body parts, wooden artifacts, and pieces of textiles.

=== Reconstruction of Tomb ===
A reconstruction of one of the tombs of Sipán is on display the American Museum of Natural History in New York City.

== Nearby Moche locations ==
- Pampa Grande is located about 10 km to the east from Sipán along the Chancay River valley.
- Chiclayo is located about 29 km to the west of Sipán.
- Lambayeque is located about 40 km to the west-northwest of Sipán.
- Pacatnamu is located about 58 km to the south of Sipán.
