= Walter Alva =

Peruvian archaeologist (born 1951)

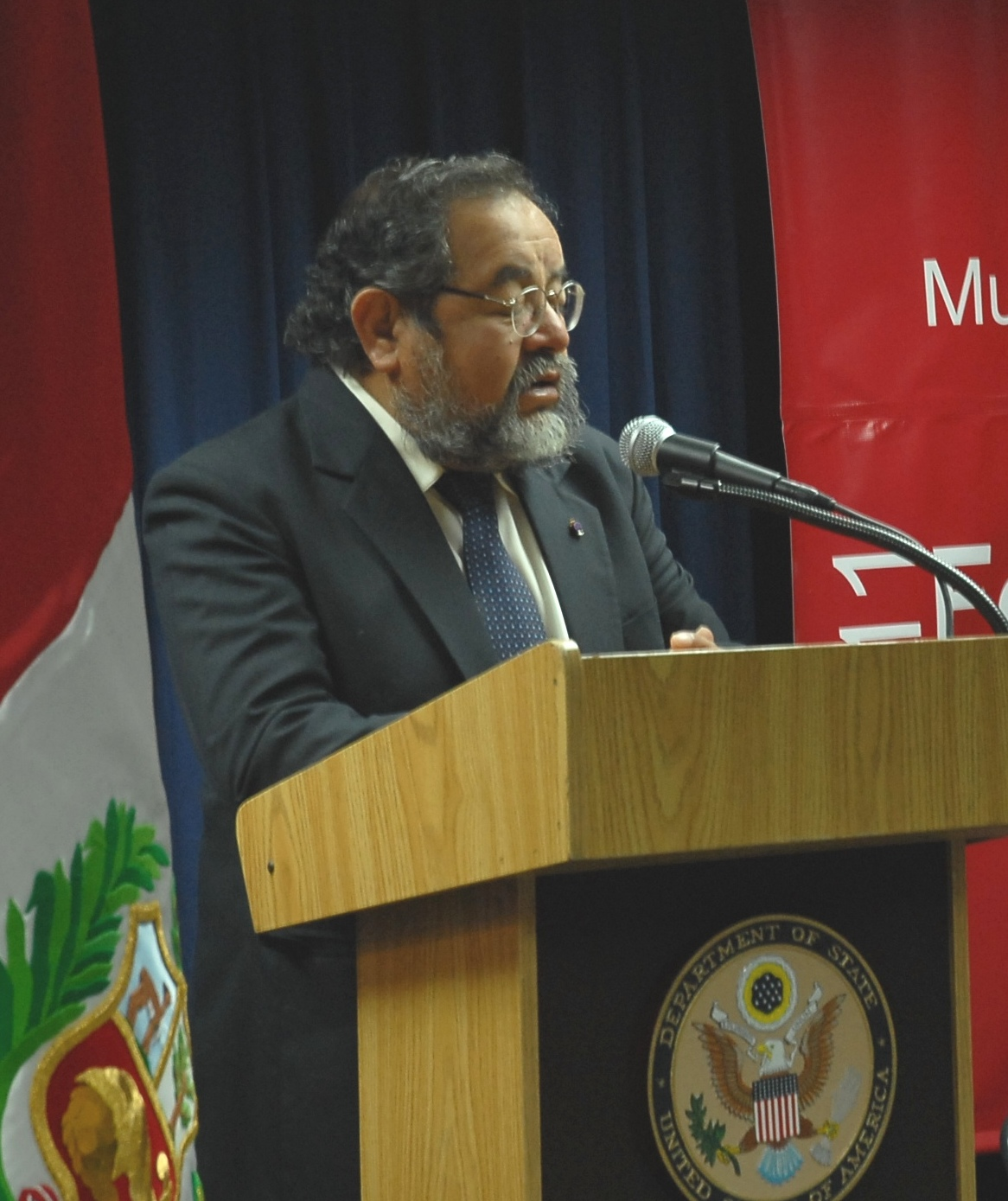
- Alva in 2011
- Born: Walter Alva Alva; 28 June 1951 (age 75); Contumazá Province, Peru
- Occupation: Archaeologist
- Employer: Bruning Archeological Museum
- Known for: Discovery of the Lord of Sipan's tomb
- Awards: Orden El Sol del Peru

Walter Alva (born 28 June 1951), born Walter Alva Alva, is a Peruvian archaeologist specializing in the study and excavation of the prehistoric Moche culture. He is known for two major finds: the tomb of the Lord of Sipan and related people in 1987, and 2007.

== Early life and education ==
Alva was born on 28 June 1951 in Contumazá Province. He earned his undergraduate and graduate degrees in archaeology.

== Career ==
Alva has worked for years at the Bruning Archeological Museum in Lambayeque, Peru. He advanced to the post of director there.

== Major finds ==
=== Lord of Sipan ===
In 1987, Alva was called by police to investigate a site at Sipán, where huaqueros (grave robbers) had stolen artifacts from an archaeological site. Despite being ill with bronchitis, he made the trip. The robbers had discovered a crypt of a lord, filled with jewels and gold, and Alva knew it was significant. Alva did most of the excavating without delay, as he was concerned that robbers might come back and cause more damage. As a result, he started digging without any funding or the support of the area police, with matters made worse as the result of the primary robber being killed by police.

After further digging, Alva found, among other things, the undamaged body of a Moche lord. From these finds, he and other scholars were able to determine that Huaca Rajada, a group of three pyramids once thought to belong to the later Chimú culture, were a part of Moche culture. The findings were later described by the National Geographic Society as the richest intact pre-Columbian tomb in the Western Hemisphere.

During many of these years, Alva was the director of the Bruning Archaeological Museum in Lambayeque, Peru.

=== Murals at Ventarron ===
In 2007, Alva discovered murals at a 4,000-year-old Peruvian temple in Ventarron. The murals, showing a deer caught in a net, are considered the oldest murals in the Americas. Alva determined their age by the process of carbon dating. The construction material that was used at the temple was not primitive. As a result, Alva was able to show that the civilization was able to spread farther than originally thought. He worked on the dig with his son Ignacio, who is also an archaeologist.

== Legacy and honors ==
- 1990, the Orden El Sol del Peru was awarded to Alva.
- 2015, Alva won the Esteban Campodónico Prize in the area of outstanding professional activity in service to Peruvian society.
