= Batán Grande =

Archaeological site in Peru

- Sicán
- Huaca Loro

- Location within Peru Location within South America
- Click on the map for a fullscreen view
- 6.47°S 79.796°W
- Type: Settlement
- Periods: Middle Horizon
- Cultures: Sican or Lambayeque
- Location: Pitipo District, Ferreñafe Province, Lambayeque Region, Peru
- Region: Tumbes–Piura dry forests (North of Peru)
- Part of: Pómac Forest Historical Sanctuary

History
- Built: c. 800
- Abandoned: c. 1200

Site notes
- Material: Adobe
- Elevation: 60–80 m (200–260 ft)
- Condition: Preserved
- Owner: Peruvian Government
- Public access: Yes

The Batán Grande or Sicán Archaeological Complex, just north of Chiclayo, Ferreñafe province, Lambayeque region, Peru, is an ancient archaeological site that was occupied by the Sicán culture. The site has 50 identified pyramids.

The archaeological site is located in the Historic Forest Sanctuary of Pómac. It was probably built between the 8th and 12th centuries A.D.

== Batán Grande Reserved Zone ==
Batán Grande Reserved Zone is a national park around the site. Primarily the park protects the ancient city of Poma founded by the Lambayeque culture around 800 C.E. This archaeological site was extensively looted throughout the 20th century. The park was established on 16 October 1991 and has a surface area of 134 km^{2}.

The Sicán Culture developed between 700 and 1350 on the north coast of Peru. The Lambayeque were a subdivision of the Sican, and appear first in the Batán Grande area.

Before the discovery of the city of Poma, Batán Grande was a farm raising sugar cane.

== See also ==
- Pómac Forest Historic Sanctuary
- Sicán culture
- Túcume
- Chotuna-Chornancap
