= Manuel Antonio Mesones Muro =

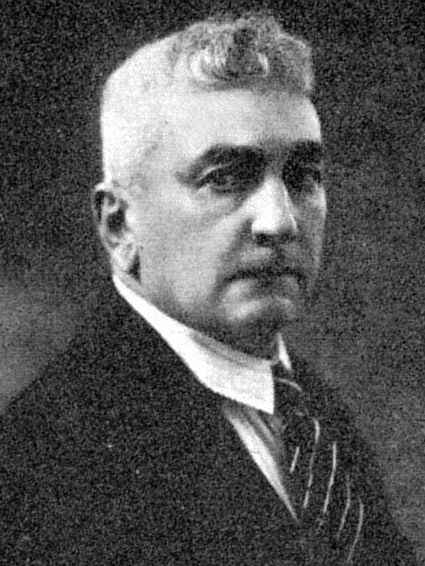
- Born: Manuel Antonio Mesones Muro; June 16, 1862; Ferreñafe, Peru
- Died: October 28, 1930 (aged 68); Chiclayo, Peru
- Occupation: Explorer

Manuel Antonio Mesones Muro (16 June 1862 - 28 October 1930) was born in Ferreñafe in the Lambayeque Region of Peru. He was one of the pioneers of the exploration of north-eastern Peru and a scientist of many talents - a natural historian, geographer, historian, geologist, archeologist and linguist.

== Early life ==
At the age of six his parents sent him to be educated in Germany, where he studied at the prestigious universities of Bremen and Hamburg before returning home to Peru aged 26, to begin a distinguished career as an explorer. Mesones Muro is also cousin for Alfredo Solf y Muro.

== Exploration of the Andes ==
Finding a route through the Andes to link the forested interior of Peru with the Pacific Ocean was a longstanding challenge. By the end of the 19th century many detailed technical and economic studies had been undertaken but Mesones Muro was the first to embark on the task of exploring all the regions of Peru in order to identify a route for the much anticipated railroad.

== "The Marañón Man" ==
Through his explorations Mesones Muro's name became permanently associated with that of one of the major tributaries of the Amazon River. One of his biographers baptised him "el hombre del Marañón" - "the Marañón man".

The idea of opening up an outlet to the Pacific Ocean for Peru's Amazon region dates back to 1843. One proposal envisaged a journey of 650 km, starting from Piura. The author, Jorge von Hassel, was convinced that no low level route existed across the high Andes. Powerful political and economic interests were already planning the construction of the proposed railroad when on April 10, 1902, Mesones Muro, at the time completely unknown, published a documented letter in Lima in which he suggested that the starting point for the shortest route to the Marañon should be Puerto Etėn. Arguing with authority and a command of all the information available he also pointed to the advantage conferred by the 48 km of track already built between Etėn and Ferreñafe.

Mesones Muro immediately set about organising an exploratory expedition, funded with his own savings. His aim was to find the solution that best served the national interest. He set out on May 18, 1902, on an expedition that was to take him on an extraordinary adventure through the Rupa-Rupa forest ending with the first trip through the Pongo de Manseriche gorge and the discovery of the Paso de Porculla, at 2,144 m above sea level the lowest point in the Andes range. Mesones's companions on this expedition were Enrique Brüning and the engineer Eduardo de Habich.

Having overcome countless obstacles, the members of the expedition returned home and Mesones himself set off for Lima, where he described the expedition's findings to the Geographical Society, causing a sensation when he revealed the existence in the Cordillera del Norte of a mountain pass only slightly higher than 2,000 m. and announced that the Pongo de Manseriche gorge was in fact navigable.

However, because of opposition from vested interests this heralded the start of a period of physical hardship and personal distress for Mesones Muro. Either through bad faith or a lack of interest, all discussion of the route through to the Marañón River ceased. With even greater determination Mesones Muro returned to his study of maps, planes, historical accounts and anything else that might be useful to him in work that very few other people understood. He was a man ahead of his time. His imagination conjured up visions of regional projects that integrated railroads with ports, rivers, navigation systems, telegraphs, etc. The idea of diverting the Huancabamba River to irrigate vast areas of land in the basin of the Pacific Ocean came to him in one such moment of inspiration.

When a dispute broke out with Ecuador during the presidency of Guillermo Billinghurst, he travelled immediately to Lima to offer his services to his country. Ten years after his previous expedition, with his high-minded enthusiasm once again enabling him to overcome the indifference and parsimony of Government authorities and employees, he sailed down the Marañón River to Iquitos in record time to show how it was possible to defend the region. As if that was not enough, he set off to make the return journey upriver through the Pongo de Manseriche gorge in a motorboat.

Back in Lima, he embarked on a vain campaign to challenge the lack of strategic vision that resulted in wasteful expenditure on small-scale projects. The only result of his efforts to gain official support for his way of seeing things was that Government employees took to referring to him as "el loco Marañon" (the Marañon madman).

Determined to prove that he was right he spent every cent he had preparing the "First commercial expedition from the Pacific Ocean to the Atlantic Ocean".

During the presidency of Augusto B. Leguía he saw one of his most costly visions - the diversion of the Huancabamba River towards the Pacific Ocean - come close to realisation and then collapse.

Finally in his last years he was appointed director of the Brüning Museum in Lambayeque, a position from which he was dismissed shortly before his death in hospital.
