= Chotuna-Chornancap =

Archaeological site in Peru

- Chotuna; Chornancap; Chot
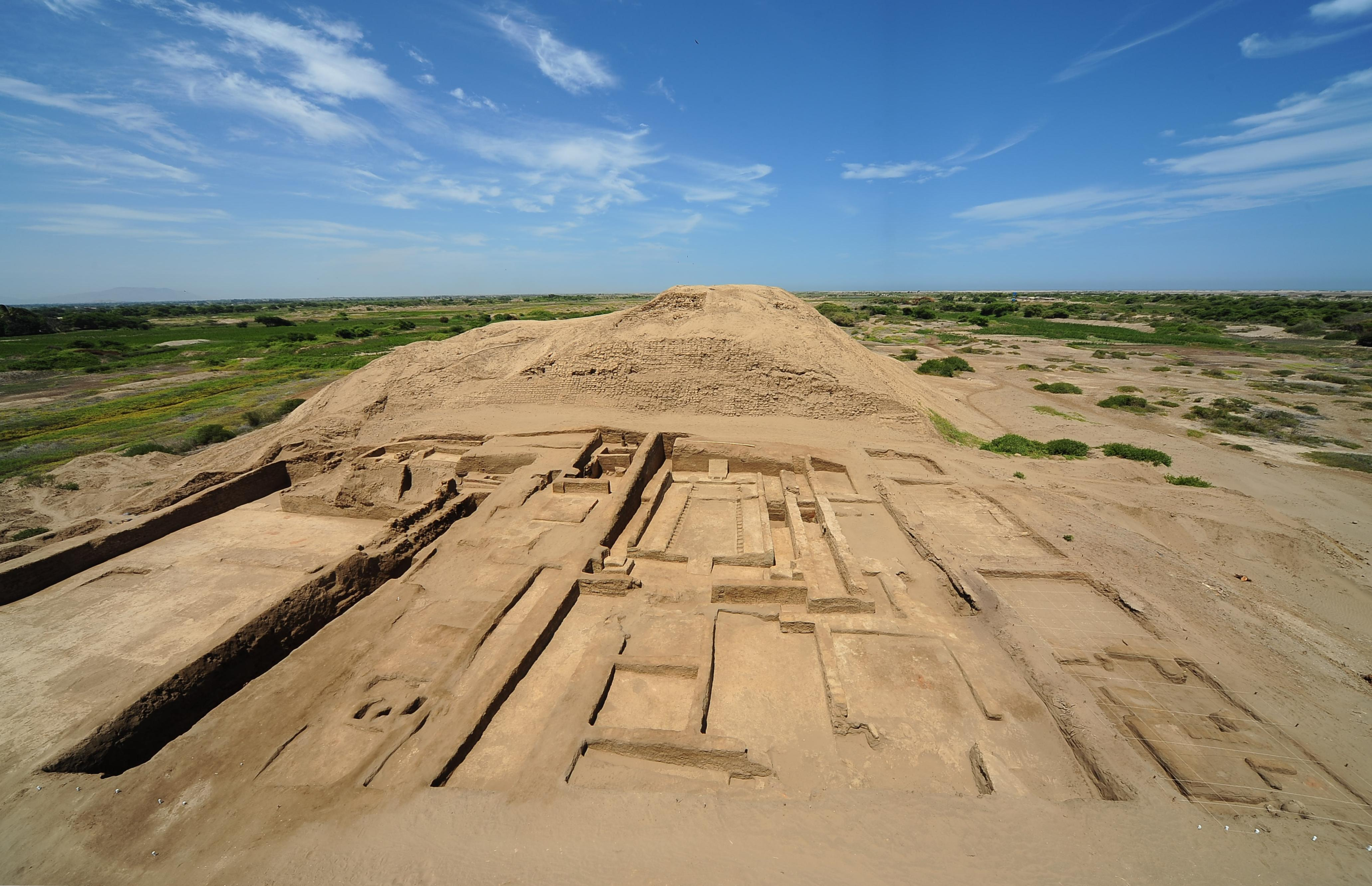
- General view of the site

- Location within Peru Location within South America
- Interactive map of Chotuna-Chornancap
- 6.7202°S 79.9529°W
- Type: Settlement
- Periods: Middle Horizon to Late Horizon
- Cultures: Sican or Lambayeque
- Region: Lambayeque province, Department of Lambayeque, Peru.

Site notes
- Material: Adobe
- Area: 95 ha (230 acres)

The Chotuna Chornancap Archaeological Complex is an archaeological site in Lambayeque district, Lambayeque province, Lambayeque Region, 14.5 kilometres (9.0 mi) north-west of Chiclayo, Peru of a set of truncated pyramids and compounds, highlighting two pyramids: Chotuna and Chornancap, the first of them believed to be related to the legend of Naylamp. Chotuna was a ceremonial center of the Sican culture, one of the cultures of Pre-Columbian Peru, which developed between the years 700 to 1300 AD. Later the Chimu and then the Inca occupation followed. In 2011 the tomb of the so-called priestess of Chornancap was discovered.

== Investigations ==
The ruins of Chotuna were investigated between the decades of 1910 and 1920 by Hans Heinrich Brüning, who identified the place with Chot, the place mentioned by the chronicler Miguel Cabello Valboa as the shrine of the idol Yampallec, according to the legend of Naylamp. Although Brüning changed his opinion afterwards, local people's sentiment still identifies Huaca Chotuna with the mythical Chot and assumes that Naylamp and his descendants are buried in its depths.

Later Chotuna and its neighboring Chornancap were visited by Hermann Trimborn and Jorge Rondón (1972); the former left historical and descriptive comments on both monuments.

Between 1980 and 1982, Christopher B. Donnan conducted research and mapped the site. He also discovered several mural paintings at Chornancap.

In 2006, the Chotuna-Chornancap Archaeological Project was initiated by archaeologist Carlos Wester La Torre, director of the Brüning National Archaeological Museum in Lambayeque, with the support of the Peruvian State through the Ministry of Culture of Peru. A complex architectural structure was uncovered, located 80 meters south of the Chornancap huaca, giving hope to scholars that the site would indeed be the mythical Chot, although no Yampallec Idol was found.

In October 2011, an elaborate tomb of a young woman assumed to be a priestess or ruler, nicknamed the "Priestess of Chornancap", her body was discovered in a dig led by Carlos Wester La Torre of the Brüning Museum, burial goods included clothing and ornaments, and eight young women sacrifices were buried along with her. They also found the tomb of a male, around 20 to 30 years old, buried with ceremonial knives. A further 13 graves were found in excavations by a different team in 2016.

In August 2012, a tomb was found under the remains of the Chornancap priestess, accompanied by a rich funerary item, presumably also an important figure.

Research continues to this day. In September 2016, the discovery of a group of 17 pre-Hispanic burials in Chornancap was announced, including one of them, apparently belonging to a prominent figure, surrounded by ceramic objects, and flanked by the remains of two children with amputated feet.

Archaeological research at the complex has revealed strong evidence of ritualised human sacrifice of both children and adults. In Chotuna-Chornancap the method of sacrifice seems to have changed over time from semi-decapitation, a common method employed by the late Moche and early Sican cultures, to chest opening, a method popularized in the north coast cultural area of Peru some centuries after the fall of Moche, mainly in the Chimu and Late Sicán territories, chest opening sacrifices were introduced through cultural diffusion from the northern region of South America to the Northern Peruvian Coast, along with many other profound cultural changes in the north coast region, the Sican and Chimu founding legends of Naylamp and Takaynamo respectively are an indicative of this. These late-adopted sacrificial techniques strongly contrast with earlier sacrificial methods in the area or with the methods commonly used in the neighboring contemporary cultures of the south, such as by strangulation or a deadly blunt blow to the back of the head.

== Chronology ==
Chotuna-Chornancap went through three periods, approximate chronology include:

- 700–1300. Ceremonial center of the Sican culture;
- 1300–1470. Chimu occupation;
- 1470–1532. Inca occupation.

The archaeological complex of Chotuna-Chornancap is located in the district of San José in the department of Lambayeque, 8 km west of the city of Chiclayo, on the northern coast of Peru. These are the remains of a set of truncated pyramids and compounds, highlighting two pyramids: Chotuna and Chornancap, the first of them related to the legend of Naylamp.

Chotuna was a ceremonial center of the Sican culture, one of the cultures of Pre-Columbian Peru, which developed between the years 700 to 1300 AD. Later the Chimu and then Inca occupation followed. In 2011 the tomb of the so-called Priestess of Chornancap was discovered.1
