= Túcume District =

Coordinates: 6.5156°S 79.8459°W

Túcume
- District
- Interactive map of Túcume
- Country: Peru
- Region: Lambayeque
- Province: Lambayeque
- Founded: November 17, 1894
- Capital: Túcume

Government
  - Mayor: Carlos Otto Santamaria Baldera

Area
  - Total: 67 km^{2} (26 sq mi)
- Elevation: 43 m (141 ft)

Population (2005 census)
  - Total: 20,951
  - Density: 310/km^{2} (810/sq mi)
- Time zone: UTC-5 (PET)
- UBIGEO: 140312

Túcume District is one of twelve districts of the province Lambayeque in Peru.
