= Bosque de Pómac Historic Sanctuary =

Protected Historical Site in Peru

Coordinates: 06°28′25″S 79°46′35″W

- Santuario Histórico Bosque de Pómac; Bosque de Pómac
- IUCN category III (natural monument or feature)
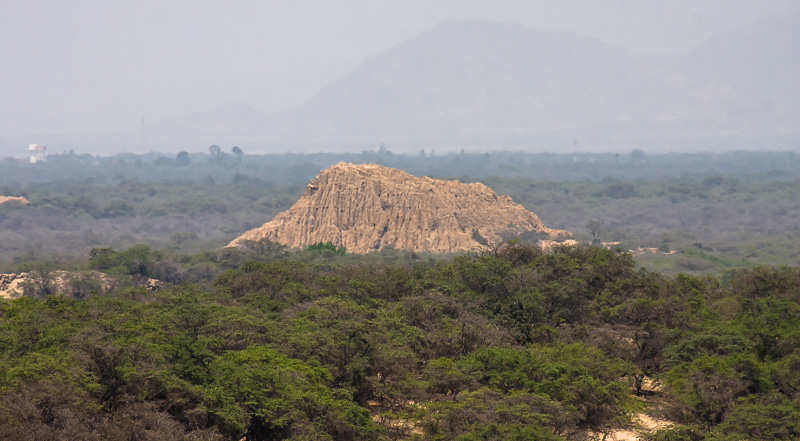
- Partial view of the forest with Huaca El Loro archaeological site.
- Interactive map of Bosque de Pómac Historic Sanctuary
- Location: Peru; Ferreñafe Province, Lambayeque
- Nearest city: Ferreñafe
- Area: 5,887.38 ha (58.87 km^{2})
- Established: 2001
- Governing body: SERNANP
- Website: Santuario Histórico Bosque de Pómac

Bosque de Pómac Historic Sanctuary (Spanish: Santuario Histórico Bosque de Pómac) is a protected area in Peru located in the region of Lambayeque. This area preserves part of the Tumbes-Piura dry forests and several pyramids in Batán Grande archaeological complex built by Pre-Columbian cultures.

== Geography ==
Bosque de Pómac is located in the district of Pitipo, Ferreñafe Province, in the northern Peruvian region of Lambayeque. This area is in a coastal plain, part of the Pacific coast tropical desert, and also in the middle valley of the La Leche river.

== Ecology ==
The area is densely covered by a tropical dry forest ecosystem, dominated by trees of the genus Prosopis. Birds seen in the area include: the Peruvian thick-knee, the burrowing owl, the Amazilia hummingbird, etc.

== Archaeology ==
There are 36 Pre-Columbian pyramids inside the area, which is an important source of archaeological discoveries, especially from the Sican culture.

== See also ==
- Batán Grande
- Iperu, tourist information and assistance
- Tourism in Peru
- Natural and Cultural Peruvian Heritage
- Sican culture
