= Pitipo District =

Coordinates: 6.5664°S 79.7808°W

Pitipo
- District
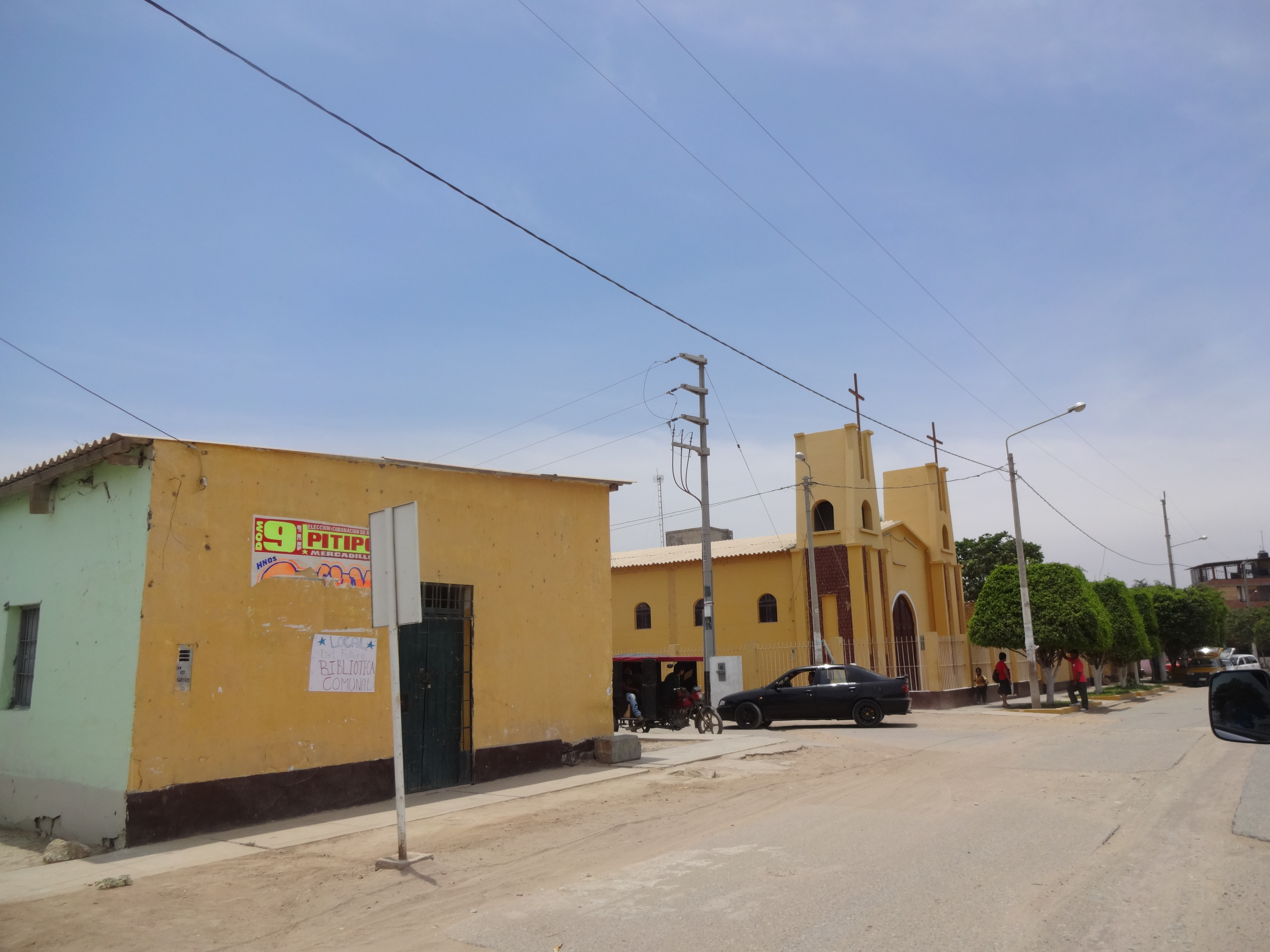
- Church of Pitipo

- Coat of arms
- Interactive map of Pitipo
- Country: Peru
- Region: Lambayeque
- Province: Ferreñafe
- Founded: February 17, 1951
- Capital: Pitipo

Government
  - Mayor: Manuel Gaudioso Valverde Ancajima

Area
  - Total: 558.18 km^{2} (215.51 sq mi)
- Elevation: 80 m (260 ft)

Population (2005 census)
  - Total: 18,466
  - Density: 33.083/km^{2} (85.683/sq mi)
- Time zone: UTC-5 (PET)
- UBIGEO: 140205

Pitipo District is one of six districts of the province Ferreñafe in Peru.

== Places of interest ==
- Pómac Forest Historical Sanctuary
