= Abra de Porculla =

Depression in Peru

Coordinates: 5.8333°S 79.5000°W

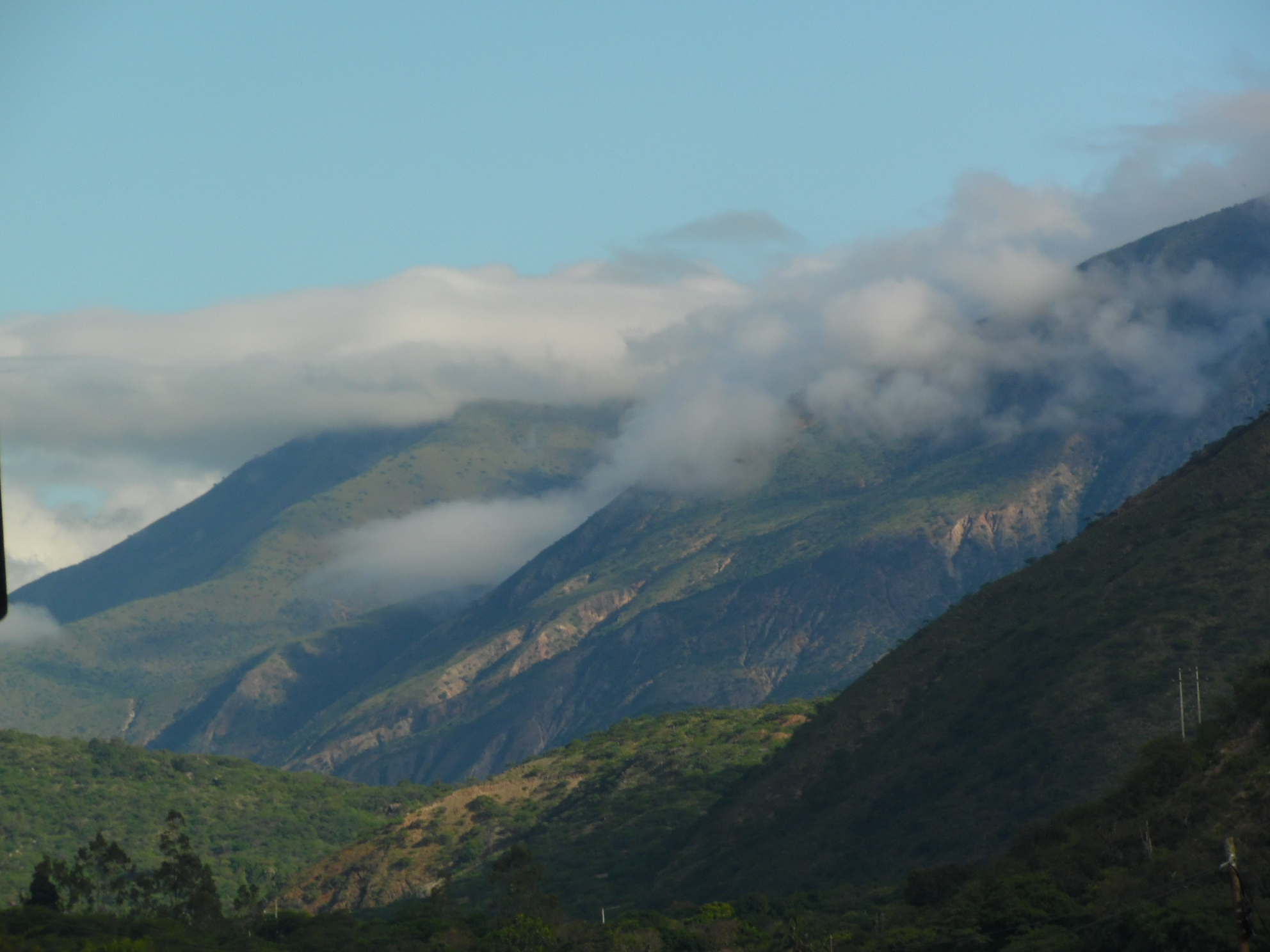

The Abra de Porculla, also known as the Paso de Porculla is an east-west pass through the Western Cordillera of the Andes Mountains in northern Peru. At 2145 m above sea level it is the lowest pass through the Andes throughout the entire length of the mountain chain from Colombia to Chile. It lies at the point where the Huancabamba Depression also interrupts the Central and Eastern Cordilleras.

The pass was discovered in 1902 by the Peruvian explorer Manuel Antonio Mesones Muro. It offers one of the shortest routes across South America between the Pacific and Atlantic Oceans and carries the Carretera Interoceánica Norte (Northern Interoceanic Highway), linking Peru and Brazil. The route offers an alternative to the Panama Canal and Cape Horn for east-west transcontinental traffic.

The Huancabamba Depression in which the Abra de Porculla pass is located separates the northern and southern Andes and serves as a biogeographic barrier to species movement. The pass, at latitude approximately 6° South, marks the southern limit of the Northern Andes Ecoregional Complex (NAEC). The NAEC is a complex of 14 distinct ecoregions in the highlands of the tropical Andes, each harbouring a unique set of species, climatic conditions, and geographical features but linked by common ecological processes.
