= Huancabamba Depression =

Valley in the Andes Mountains, Peru

Coordinates: 5.8333°S 79.5000°W

The Huancabamba Depression is an east–west depression through the Andes Mountains of northern Peru. The Huancabamba Depression interrupts the Central and Eastern Cordilleras of the Andes, and the Marañón River and its tributaries drain eastward through the depression into the Amazon basin. The Western Cordillera has its lowest point, 2,145 meters (7,037 ft), at the Paso de Porculla.

The Huancabamba Depression is home to the Marañón dry forests, which form both a biogeographic connection between the lowland forests of the Pacific coast and the Amazon basin, and a biogeographic barrier between the Northern Andes and the Central Andes.
