= Túcume =

Archaeological site in Peru

- Pyramids of Túcume Purgatorio
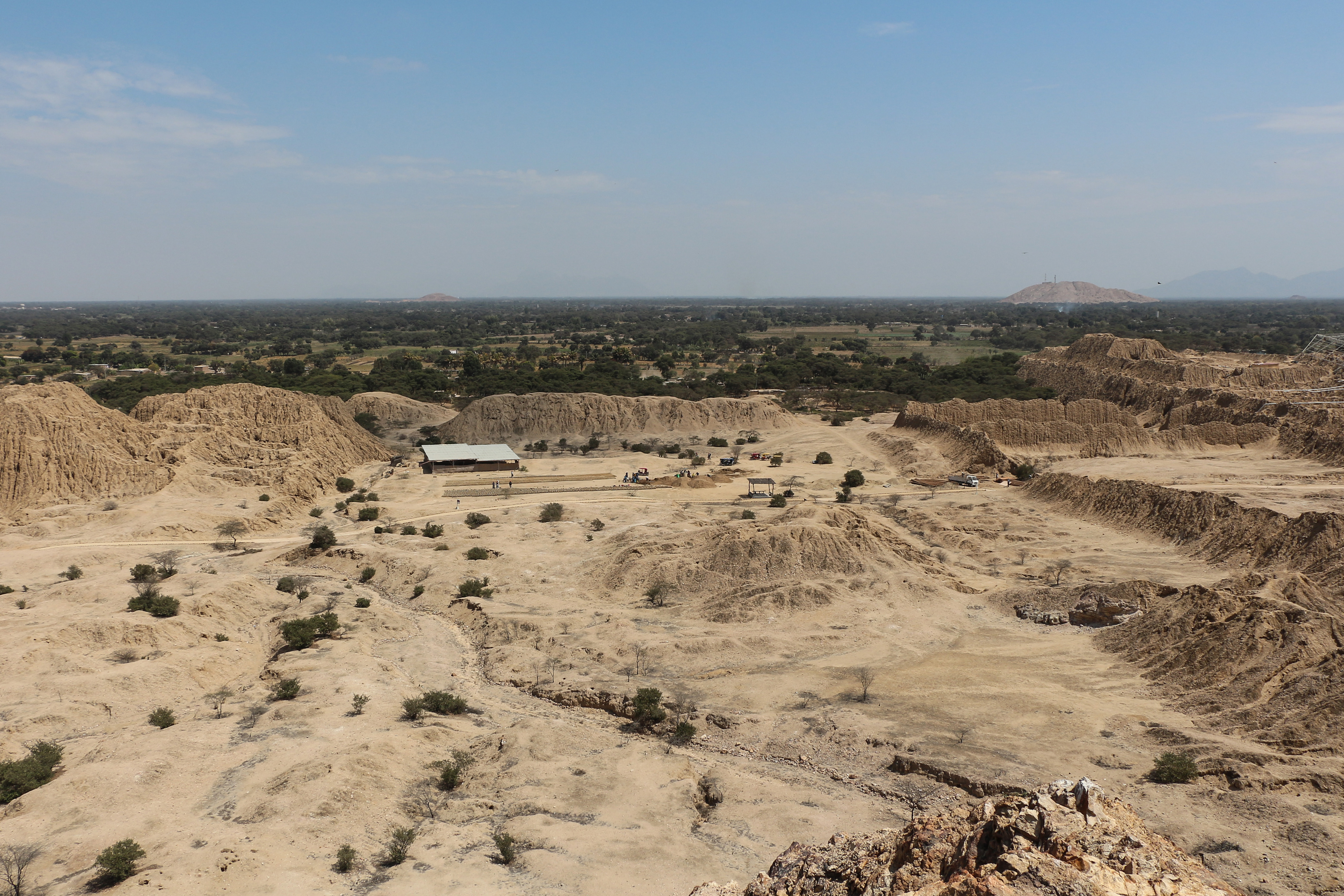
- General view of the site

- Location within Peru Location within South America
- Interactive map of Túcume
- 06°30′57″S 79°50′39″W
- Type: Settlement
- Periods: Middle Horizon to Late Horizon
- Cultures: Sican, Chimú, Inca
- Location: Túcume
- Region: Túcume District, Lambayeque Province, Lambayeque Region, Peru

History
- Built: c. 800
- Built by: Sican culture
- Abandoned: 1532

Site notes
- Material: Adobe
- Area: 2.185 km^{2} (0.844 sq mi)

Túcume is a pre-Hispanic site in Peru, south of the La Leche River on a plain around La Raya Mountain. It covers an area of over 540 acres (220 ha) and encompassing 26 major pyramids and mounds. The area is referred to as "Pirámides de Túcume" (en: pyramids of Túcume) or Purgatorio (purgatory) by local people.

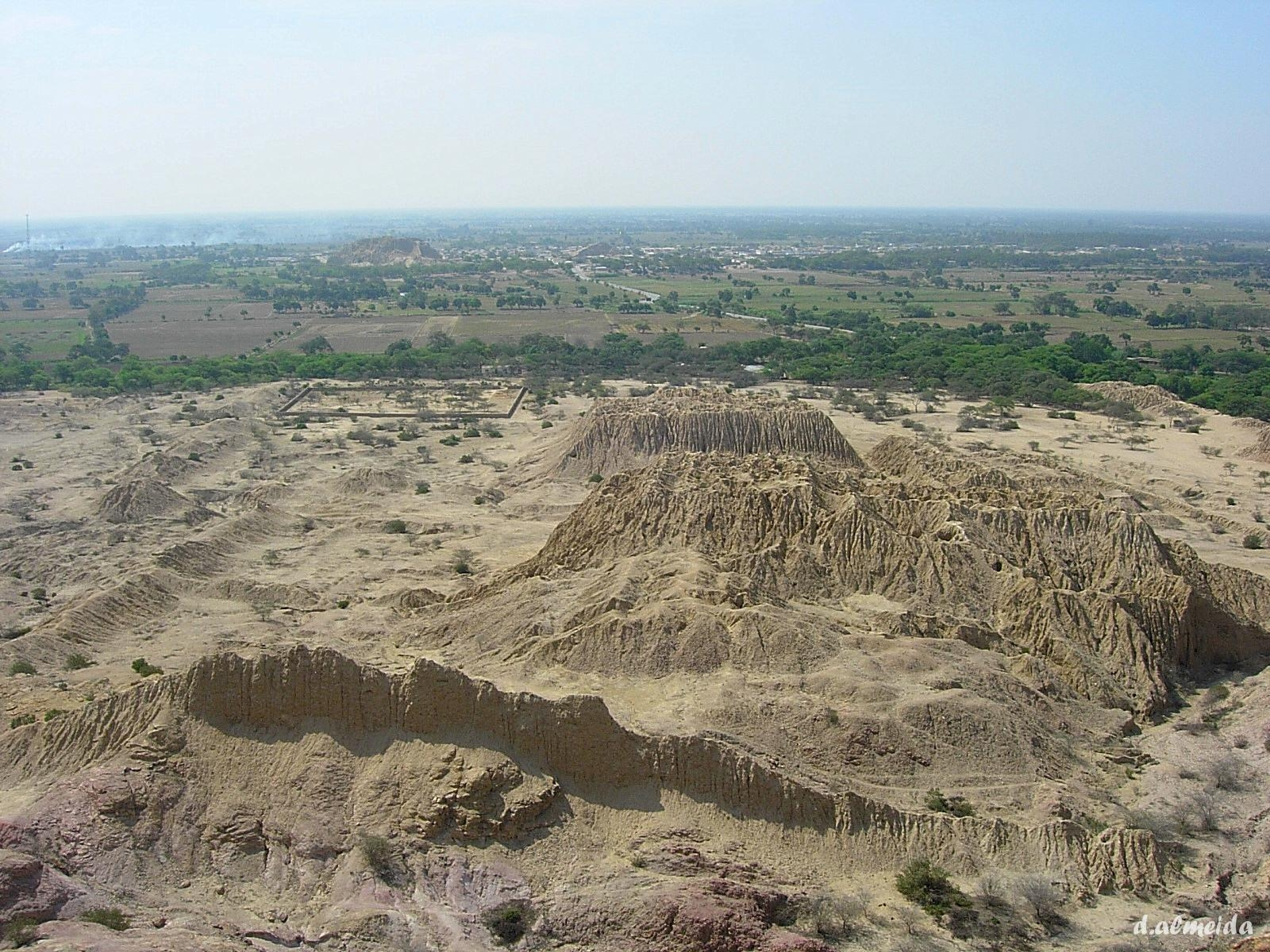
The Túcume mounds

The site was a major regional center, maybe even the capital of the successive occupations of the area by the Lambayeque/Sican (800-1350 AD), Chimú (1350–1450 AD) and Inca (1450–1532 AD). Local shaman healers (curanderos) invoke power of Tucume and La Raya Mountain in their rituals, and local people fear these sites.

The vast plains of Túcume are part of the Lambayeque region, the largest valley of the north coast of Peru. The Lambayeque Valley is the site of scores of natural and man-made waterways and is also a region containing the remains of about 250 decaying and heavily eroded mud-brick pyramids.

== See also ==
- Iperu, tourist information and assistance
- Tourism in Peru
