= Sican culture =

Archaeological culture in Peru

Sican
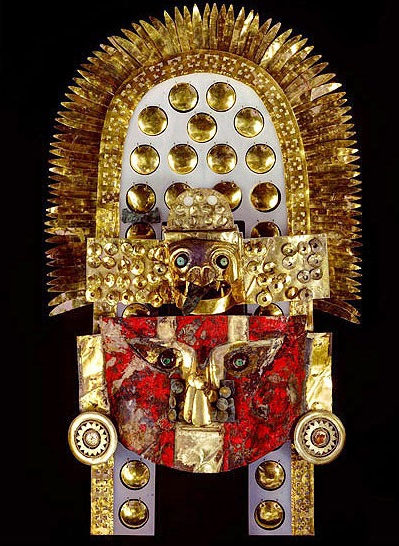
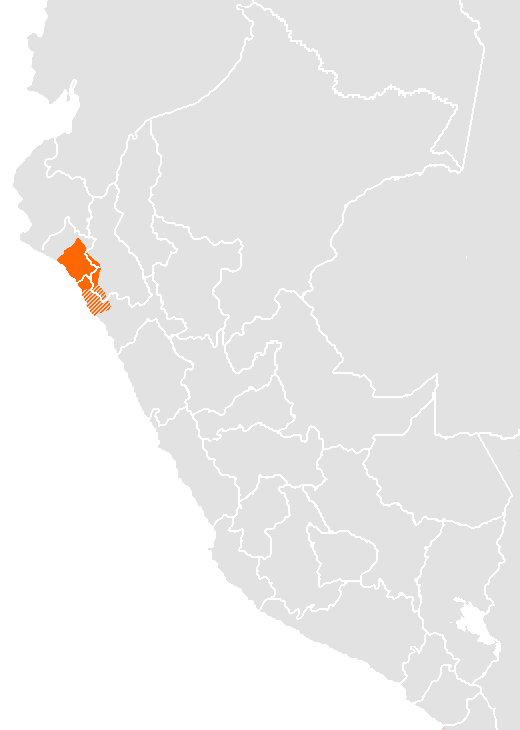
- Approximate extent of the Sican culture based on the extent of the Mochica and sites outside Lambayeque (orange).
- Alternative names: Lambayeque culture Lambayeque kingdom
- Language: Mochica (common language)
- Horizon: Middle Horizon
- Geographical range: Department of Lambayeque: Olmos valley Motupe Valley; La Leche valley Lambayeque valley Zaña valley Department of La Libertad: Chamán valley Jequetepeque valley Chicama valley
- Period: Late Intermediate
- Dates: c. 750 - 1375
- Type site: Batán Grande (Sicán)
- Major sites: Túcume; Chotuna-Chornancap; Apurlec; Cucurripe; Rosario Group huacas
- Characteristics: Specialists in goldsmithing and metallurgy of ancient Peru.
- Preceded by: Moche
- Followed by: Chimor

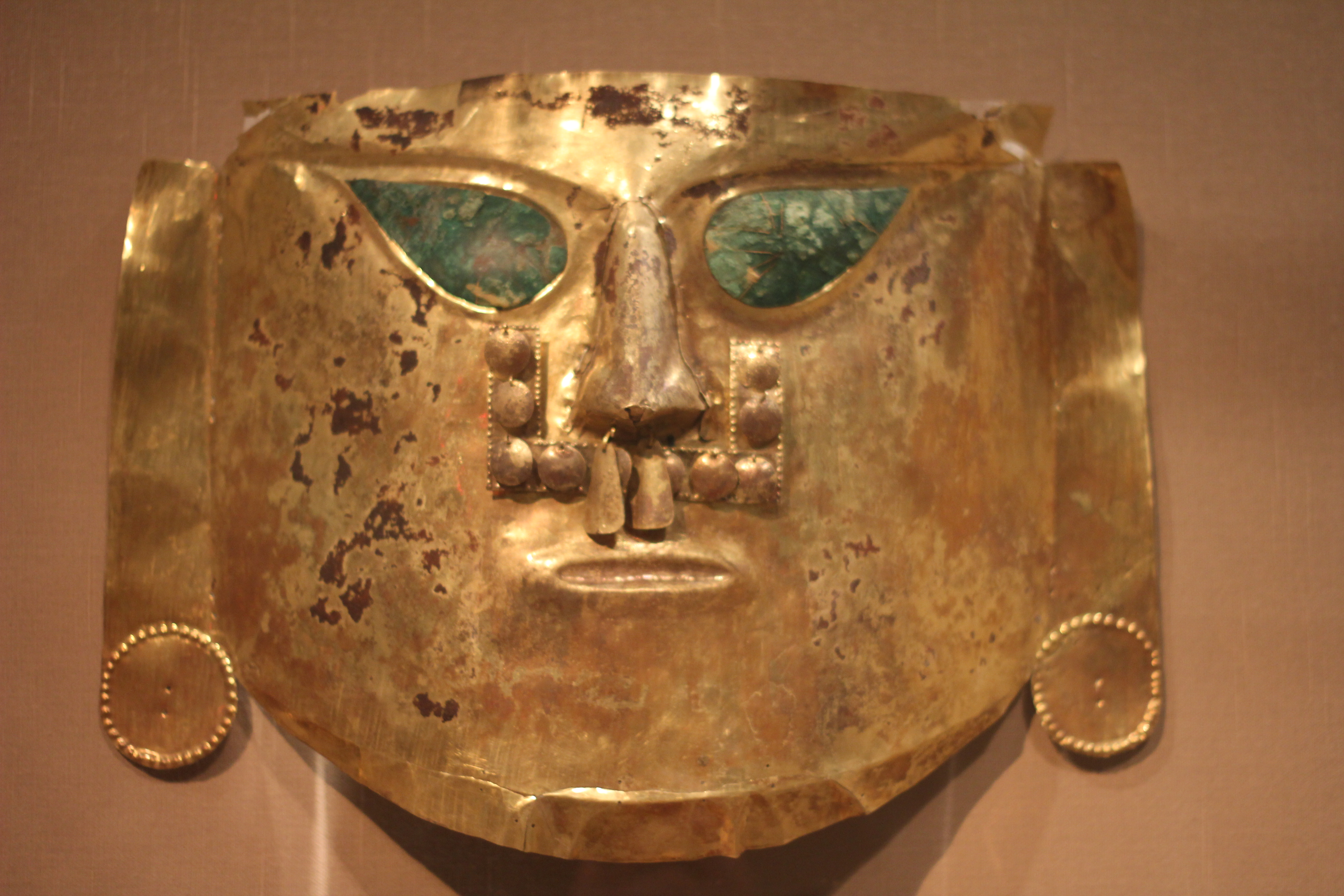
Gold Ceremonial Mask, La Leche Valley, A.D. 900-1100

The Sican (also Sicán) culture is the name that archaeologist Izumi Shimada gave to the culture that inhabited what is now the north coast of Peru between about 750 and 1375 CE. According to Shimada, Sican means "temple of the Moon". The Sican culture is also referred to as Lambayeque culture, after the name of the region in Peru. It succeeded the Moche culture. There is still controversy among archeologists and anthropologists over whether the two are separate cultures. The Sican culture is divided into three major periods based on cultural changes as evidenced in archeological artifacts.

== Geography and location ==
Archaeologist Izumi Shimada, founder of the Sican Archaeological Project, named the prehistoric culture which he discovered in northwestern Peru. They succeeded the Moche and preceded Chimor and the Inca Empire, the historical civilization that encountered the Spanish explorers and conquistadors.

The Sican inhabited a coastal territory near the La Leche and Lambayeque Rivers. The archaeological sites span the Lambayeque region, including the Motupe, La Leche, Lambayeque, and Zaña valleys, near modern-day Chiclayo. Numerous sites have been identified in the Batán Grande area of the La Leche Valley.

The climate of the area during Sican occupation was similar to the current climate, despite changes in landscape accumulated in the last 600 years. The drought-and-flood cycles seen in the region for the past 1500 years did not spare the Sican culture. (Goldstein and Shimada 2007, p. 49)

== Historical periods ==
=== Early Sican ===
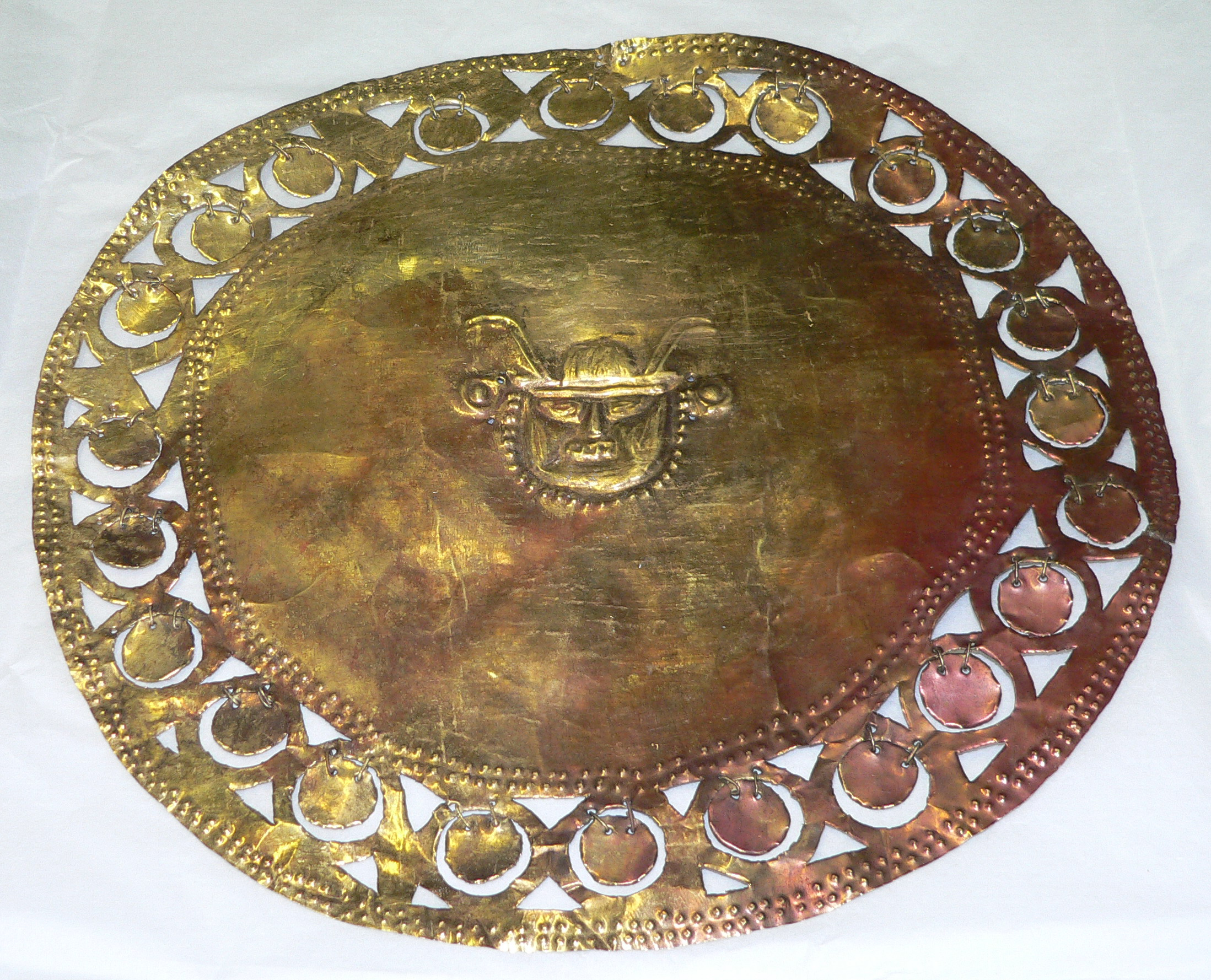
Gold disc ornament

The Early Sican period began around 750 and lasted until 900. The lack of artifacts has limited the development of knowledge about this early period. The Sican were probably descendants of the Moche culture, which fell around 800. Their works shows shared motifs in the artifacts recovered. Similar groups include Cajamarca, Wari, and Pachacamac. From remains found in the archaeological locations, researchers have determined that this culture maintained commercial exchange with people from present-day Ecuador (shells and snails), Colombia to the north (emeralds and amber), Chile to the south (blue stone), and the eastern basin of the Marañón River (seeds of gold). The Lambayeque culture may have been a separate trading people as well. Around 800, the Sican created the city of Poma, located at Batán Grande, in La Leche Valley. Few other Early Sican sites have been discovered.

The Early Sican culture is known for the highly polished, black-finish ceramics found in the La Leche Valley. This black-finish ceramic style began in the Moche culture prior to the Early Sican, and shows the sharing of cultures in the region. Much of the ceramics were examples of a single spout, loop-handle bottle, featuring an anthropomorphic-avian (bird) face at the spout base. The face consisted of bulging eyes, a hooked beak or triangular projection instead of a nose, stylized ears, and no mouth. It appeared to be a predecessor to the related faces of the Sican Deity and the Sican Lord of the Middle Sican culture. (Shimada 2000, p. 51)

Aside from the shared ceramic styles, much of the Early Sican defines a distinguishable culture. While the ceramic styles and iconography show some continuity with previous cultures, the combination of all the influences is Sican. The changing ceramic styles, iconography, and funerary practices reflect a change in religious ideology and cosmology that expressed the Sican culture. Most importantly, the late Early Sican period saw the accumulation of these changes in art style and iconography, coupled with other changes in organization, by which the Sican constructed monumental adobe structures, developed large-scale copper alloy smelting and metalworking, and developed the elaborate funerary tradition that would come to characterize the Middle Sican (Shimada 1985, p. 361). Such changes have been seen by researchers at sites in Batán Grande, including the Huaca del Pueblo site, dated to around 850-900.

=== Middle Sican ===
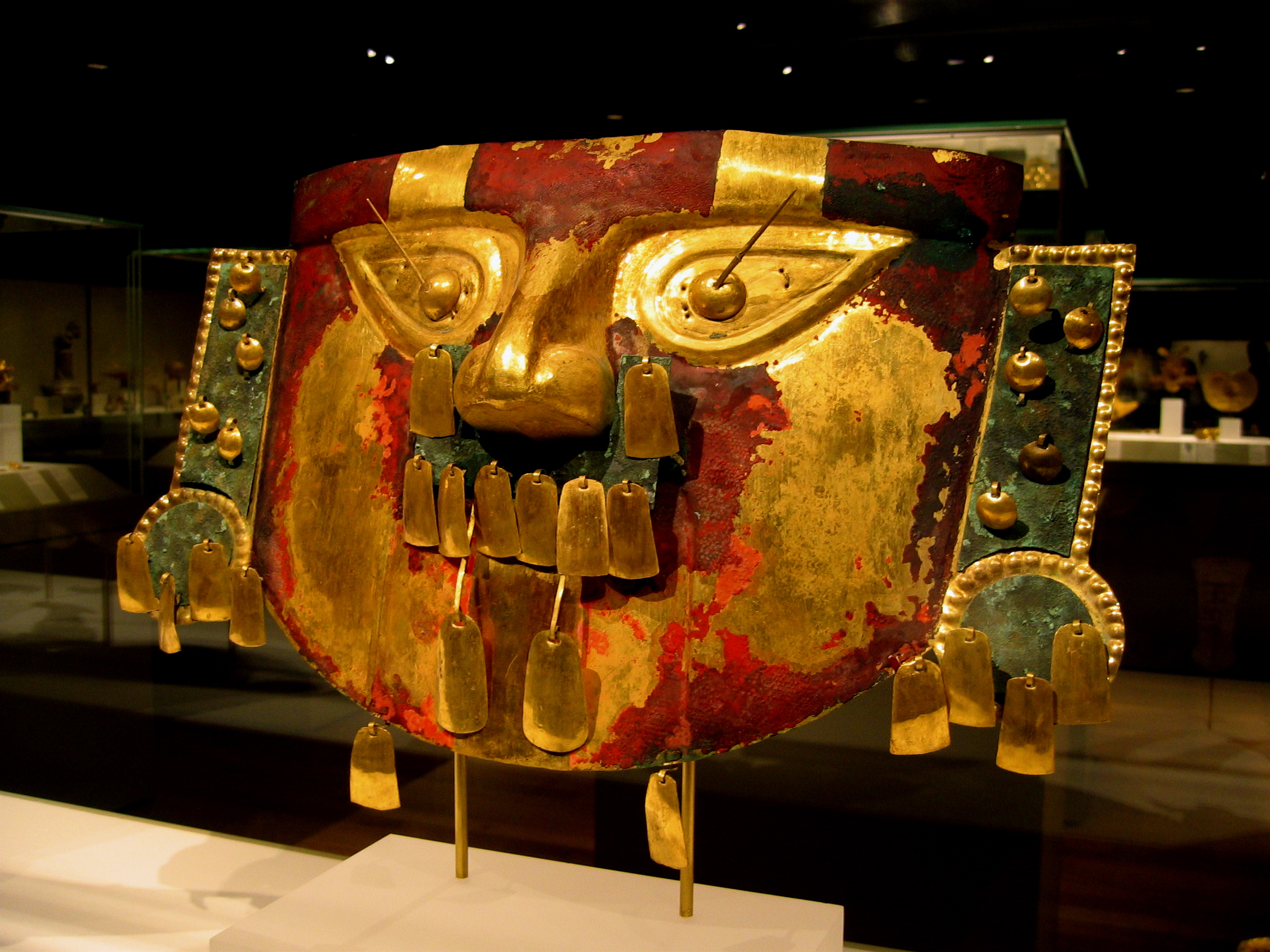
9-11th century Sican funerary mask in the Metropolitan Museum of Art, New York

The Middle Sican period lasted from 900 to 1100 . This is the period of the Sican's "cultural florescence", and is marked by the emergence of various cultural innovations, some of which were unprecedented in the local area. The decline of the Wari Empire and the Middle Cajamarca polity enabled the resurgence in local political and religious identity and autonomy. The Middle Sican culture is marked by distinctive characteristics in six areas: art and ideology, crafts and technology, funerary customs, long-distance trade, religious cities and monumental temples, and the structure and authority of the state (Shimada 2000, p. 52-61; Shimada 1985, p. 365-369). Together, these characteristics provide evidence that the Sicán culture had a highly productive economy, clear social differentiation, and an influential religious ideology. The religious ideology was the underpinning of the structure of their theocratic state.

==== Art and ideology ====
Sicán art is representational in style and religious in nature. Features such as sculptural representation and the minimization of number of colors (one to three), were common among the art of many earlier cultures that flourished on the north coast of Peru. Sicán art reconfigured the motifs, conventions, and concepts of these antecedent cultures (mainly the Wari and Moche) into an overall new and unique style. The references to the old ideas, images and ways of antecedent cultures in Sicán art would have been useful in providing prestige and legitimacy to the new Sicán religion which was emerging.

Sicán iconography is dominated by the Sican Deity It decorates all artistic media of the Sicán, including ceramics, metal works, and textiles. Metal objects such as silver beakers also served as important media for Sicán religious expression, often featuring iconography of supernatural figures, processions, and marine elements associated with cosmological beliefs and ritual practice. The icon is most commonly represented with a mask face and upturned eyes. Sometimes it may be shown with avian features, such as beaks, wings, and talons, which are evident in Early Sicán ceramics. These avian features are related to Naylamp, the key figure in Sicán mythology. The name "Naylamp" was first mentioned by the Spanish chronicler Miguel Cabello Valboa, who referred to the Moche figure "Naymlap" in his 1586 Miscelánea Antártica. Later authors believe the form is Mochica Ñañlap, of which the first part is ñañ "waterfowl"; a connexion has been made between the Moche and Chimú cultures and the empire of Chimor and the Mochica language.

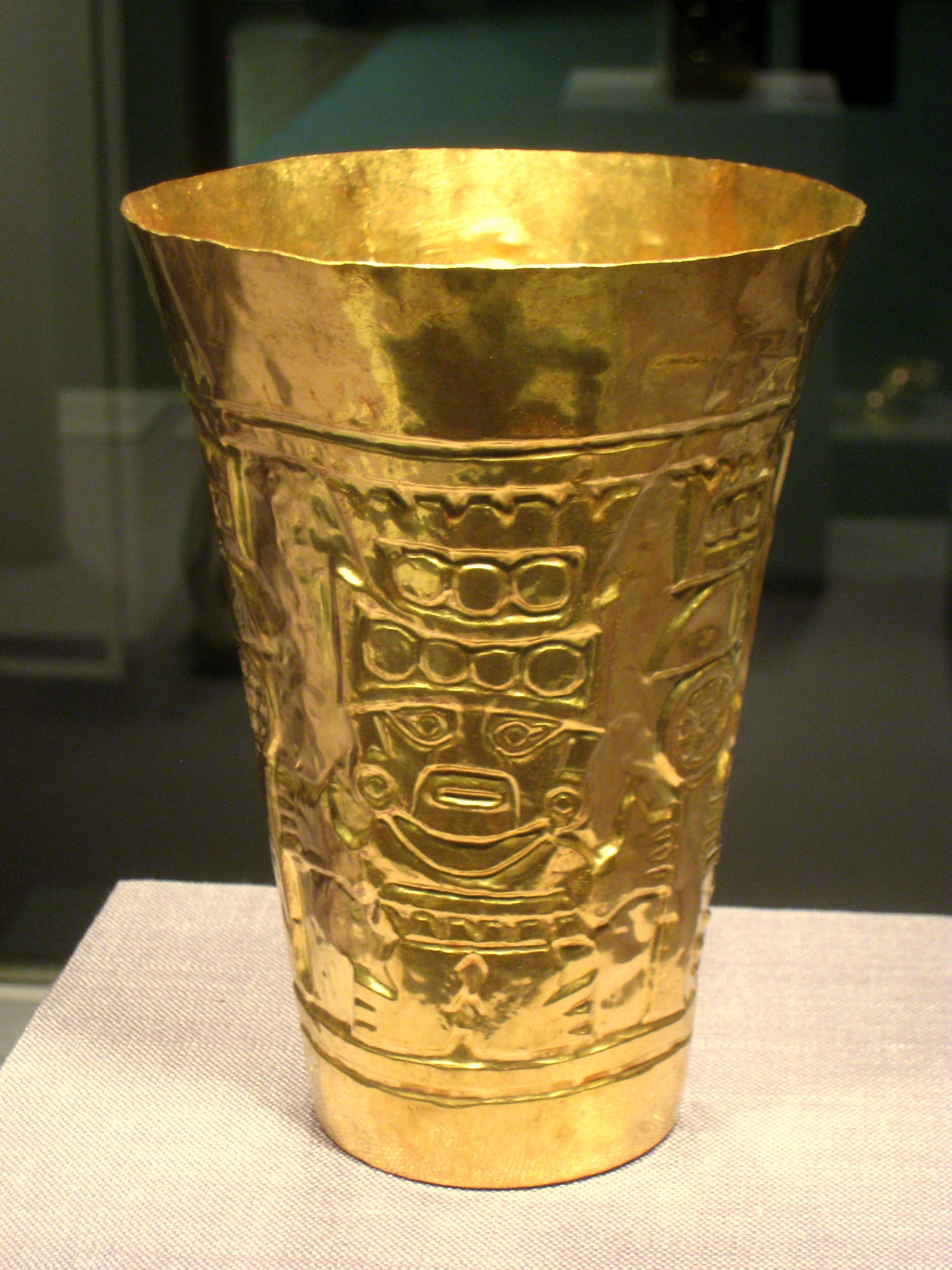
Sican gold cup, 850-1050

Naylamp was said to be the founder of the first dynasty of prehistoric kings in La Leche and Lambayeque valleys. In The Legend of Naylamp, first recorded in the 16th century by the Spanish chronicler Miguel Cabello de Balboa, Naylamp is said to have traveled on a balsa raft by sea to the Lambayeque shores. He founded a large city, and the 12 sons of his eldest son each founded a new city in the Lambayeque region. When Naylamp died, he sprouted wings and flew off to another world (Nickle Arts Museum 2006, p. 18 and 65). Middle Sicán art did not change the concept or representation of the icon of the Sicán Deity. Both the preceding Moche and Wari cultures feature a single dominant male figure, and the upturned eyes characteristic of the Sicán Deity are common to the art and iconography of other Pre-Hispanic societies. The iconography accompanying the Sicán Deity was unique and significant (Nickle Arts Museum 2006, p. 66). Iconography of the moon and the ocean may symbolize the Sicán Deity's involvement in the wellbeing of marine life and fishermen. Iconography related to water signifies the importance of irrigation and agriculture to the Sicán. Other iconography, such as of the sun and moon, symbolizes the importance of duality in both human and celestial life. Depictions of the Sicán Deity with tumi knives and trophy heads may indicate his omnipotent control in both human life and the celestial world (Nickle Arts Museum 2006, p. 66; Shimada 2000, p. 52-53). Through the iconography which the Sicán associated with the icon, anthropologists theorize that the Sicán Deity may have been attributed with power to control all of the celestial forces fundamental to life and abundance (Shimada 2000, p. 53).

The lack of representation of humans in Middle Sicán art emphasizes the omnipresence of the Sicán Deity in Sicán iconography. The only exceptions are representations of the Sicán Lord, the male elite personage, and his entourage. (Shimada 2000, p. 53) Iconography of the Sicán Lord is almost identical to the Sicán Deity, except that he is shown in natural settings and does not have avian features. The Sicán Lord was probably meant to represent an earthly alter-ego of the Deity.

==== Crafts and technology ====
The population of Batán Grande included many skilled artisans. Craft production during the Middle Sican flourished and became one of the leading characteristics of the period. The highly polished black finish ceramics from the Early Sican bloomed in this later phase, along with metallurgy; however, the ceramic technology used in the Middle Sican developed over 2500 years from local pottery production techniques (Shimada and Wagner 2001, p. 26). Workshops, such as the one found at Huaca Sialupe to the west of Batán Grande, likely had both pottery and metalworking production sites (Goldsmith and Shimada 2007, p. 45). Ceramics allowed for a medium to convey political and religious ideology in the forms of storage vessels, architectural ornaments, cooking vessels, sculptures of the Deity or animals, and other types proliferated during this period. The potters likely worked separately from one another, rather than in assembly-line type production. Huaca Sialupe excavations produced clusters of similar kilns using local hardwood for charcoal. Field experiments indicated that the kilns were used either for ceramics or metallurgy (Shimada and Wagner 2001, p. 28). The Paleteada ceramics used the paddle-and-anvil technique to form and decorate pottery, primarily with geometric designs (Cleland and Shimada 1998, p. 112). The monochrome black pottery became widely popular across the region during the Middle Sican as the Sican themselves began to emphasize the black pottery, with the help of the Middle Sican religious prestige. Only the geometric designs continued on the pottery into the Late Sican.

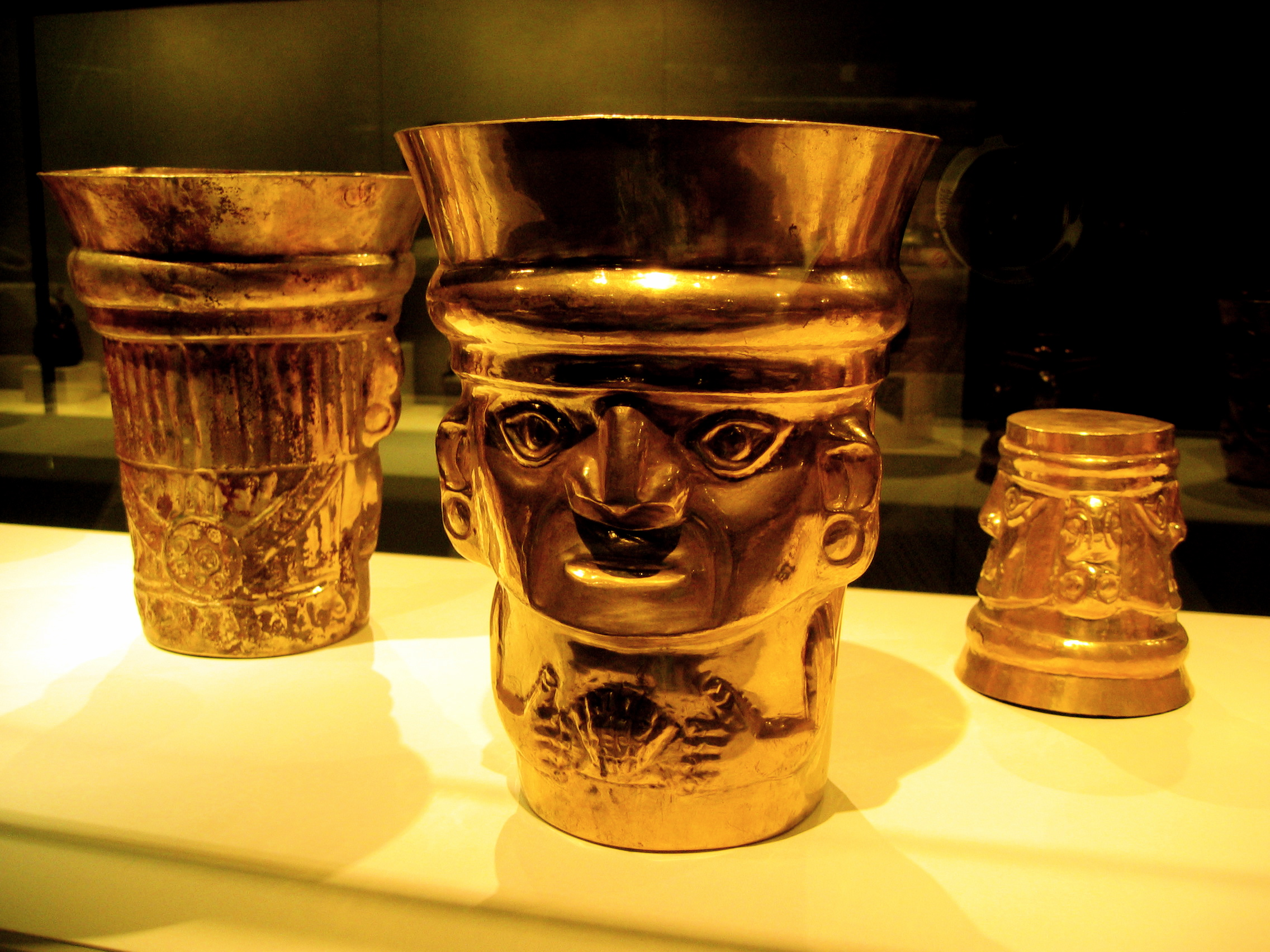
9th to 11th century Sican beaker gold cups from Lambayeque, Peru. Now in the Metropolitan Museum

Metallurgy is one of the Sican's greatest legacies, lasting nearly 600 years at Batán Grande (Shimada and Merkel 1991, p. 83). Some Middle Sican workshops showed multicraft production and it is likely the crafts competed for resources, such as fuel for kilns. Middle- and high-status burials both contained the black ceramics, while only the social elite had access to the precious metal object; therefore, metalworking probably was given production preference by the elites (Goldsmith and Shimada 2007, p. 47). Among Sicán metalwork, artisans produced elaborately decorated silver drinking vessels, including beakers, using advanced hammering and repoussé techniques; these objects were closely associated with elite ritual practices. The greatness of Middle Sican metallurgy was the large-scale smelting and diverse use of arsenical copper, which was more ductile and corrosion-resistant than pure copper. The great amounts of smelting and/or metalworking sites found in the Lambayeque region point to the convergence of major factors to allow such an occurrence: accessible ore deposits, extensive forests for hardwood to make charcoal, pottery making tradition using efficient kilns, gold working tradition that formed the basis for later metalworking technology, and a demand for goods by the elites (Shimada, Goldstein, Wagner, Bezur 2007, p. 339). The large number of smelting sites also point to the amount of labor required by using their method. In modern standards, their copper-alloy smelting was inefficient, which could have led to the high number of workshops with multiple furnaces (Shimada and Merkel 1991, p. 85).

==== Society ====
The precious metal objects found in Middle Sican sites reveal the unprecedented scale of their production and use. Metal objects permeated all levels of society. Tumbaga, a thin sheet of low-karat gold alloy, was used to wrap ceramic vessels for the lower elites, while the upper elites had high karat gold alloys. Common laborers only had arsenical copper objects. The precious metal objects then clearly demonstrate a hierarchy within the society (Shimada 2000, p. 56). No evidence of metalworking at the large sites has been uncovered, such as the Middle Sican capital Sican or elsewhere in the Batán Grande area, but the precious metal objects were clearly for the elites. From their high status sites, the elites supervised the manufacturing of their precious metal objects for ritual or funerary purposes (Shimada and Merkel 1991, p. 86).

==== Funerary practices ====
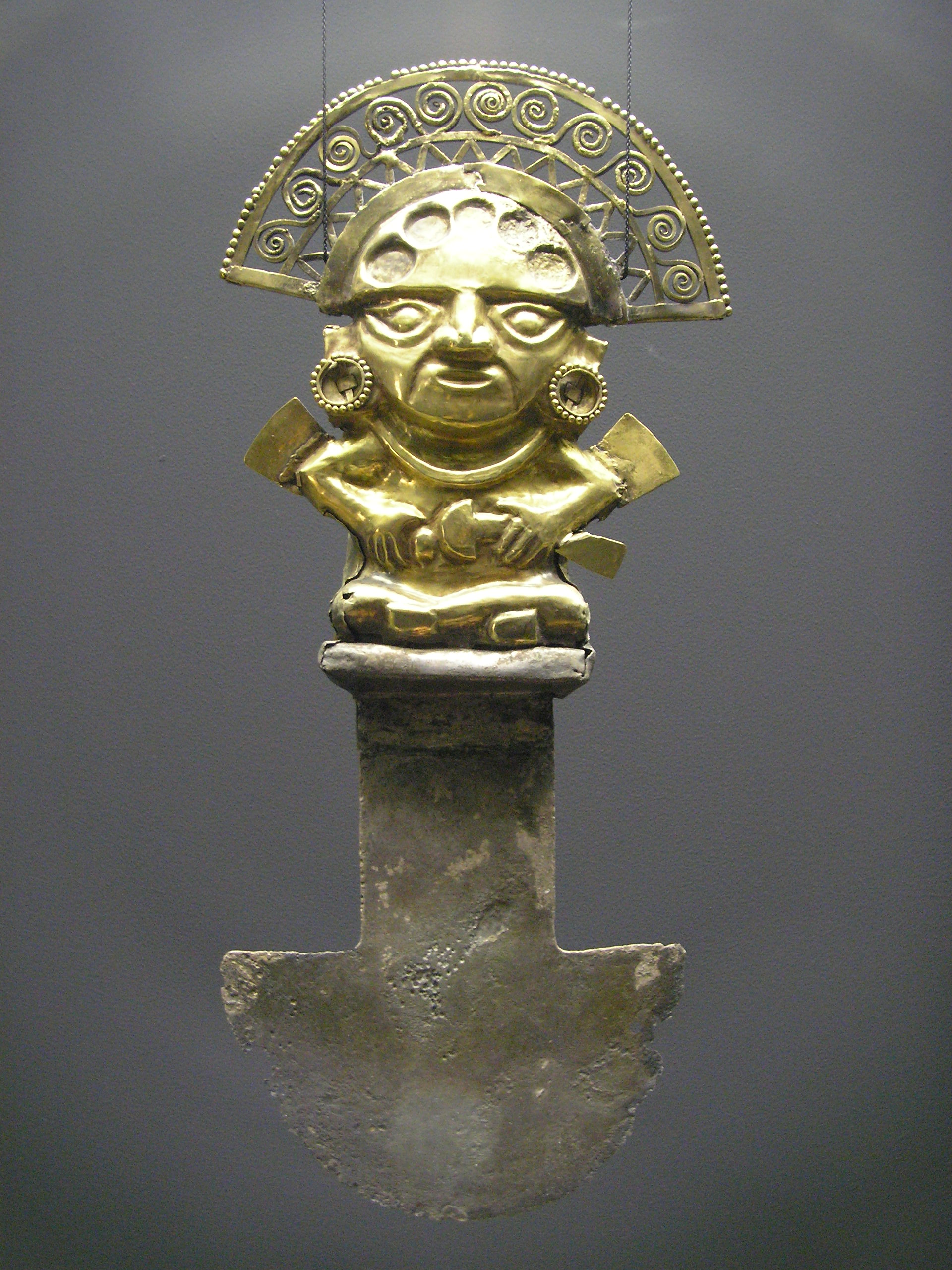
Ceremonial Tumi, 850-1050

Excavations of religious sites have revealed much about the funerary practices of the Sicán people. These funerary practices have helped anthropologists understand the broader organization and structure of Sicán society and religion. Most of the evidence for these funerary practices has been based on excavations carried out at the Huaca Loro site in the city of Poma, located at Batán Grande, in La Leche Valley, by Izumi Shimada and the SAP.

First of all, the funerary practices at Huaca Loro reflect the social differentiation and hierarchy present Sicán society. This social stratification is revealed in varying burial types and practices, along with accompanying grave goods. Heavily decorated silver drinking vessels, including beakers, have also been identified among elite Sicán grave goods and were likely used in ceremonial drinking practices associated with funerary rituals.

The most obvious difference in burial type based on social hierarchy was that commoners were buried in simple, shallow graves on the peripheries of the monumental mounds while the elite of Sicán society were buried in deep shaft tombs beneath monumental mounds, as shown in the East and West tombs at Huaca Loro. Secondly, it was found that one's social status was also a determinant of the burial position of the body; seated, extended, or flexed. For example, bodies of the High Elite were always buried in the seated position, while commoners could be buried in a seated, extended, or flexed position (Nickle Arts Museum 2006, p. 87; Shimada et al. 2004).

Furthermore, social differentiation is manifested even within the elite tombs at Huaca Loro, through the grouping and placement of bodies. The complex internal organization of both East and West Tombs was designed according to specific social and kinship relationships (Shimada et al. 2004). Recent studies that included the use of MtDNA (systematic mitochondrial DNA) analysis and inherited dental traits analysis revealed that women in the West Tomb were grouped according to their kinship ties to the principal personage and each other (Shimada et al. 2005; Shimada et al. 2004). The grouping of women in the south part of the West Tomb were found to be maternally related to one another, as well as the principal personage; the grouping of women in the north part of the West Tomb were found to not only be unrelated to one another, but also unrelated to the principal personage. Further, ceramics in the south part were found to be of typical Middle Sicán style, while the ceramics in the North part were of a Mochica style (Shimada et al. 2005; Shimada et al. 2004). This evidence suggests that while the women of the South part of the West tomb were grouped and placed according to their kinship ties with the principal personage, the women of the North part of the West tomb had no kinship ties with the principal personage or each other therefore were placed and grouped according to some other distinct relationship to the principal personage. This genetic evidence and along with the differing styles of ceramics suggests that the North-niche women of the West Tomb were perhaps descendants of a different ethnic group, the Moche, who had been integrated into Sicán society under political domination (Shimada et al. 2004). While these relationships have not been proved definitively, it shows the great complexity itself of elite burial practices based on social differentiation.

Social stratification and hierarchy is also evidenced through the variation in quantity and quality of grave goods associated with those of different social status. The elite East Tomb at Huaca Loro, contained over a ton of diverse grave goods, over two-thirds of which were objects of arsenical bronze, tumbaga (low-karat gold), silver and copper alloys, and high-karat gold alloys. Other grave goods of the elite included semi-precious stone objects, amber, feathers, textiles, imported shells (such as conus and spondylus), shell beads, and double spout bottles. (Nickle Arts Museum 2006, p. 87; Shimada 2000, p. 56; Bruhns 1994, p. 290) On the other hand, commoner burials had a significantly less amount of grave goods of different types, made of less valuable materials. For example, commoner grave goods at Huaca Loro were usually restricted to single-spout bottles, utilitarian plain and/or paddle decorated pottery, and copper-arsenic objects, instead of the precious metal objects of the elite tombs. (Nickle Arts Museum 2006, p. 87, Shimada et al. 2004) The power of the elite of Sicán society is demonstrated not only by the amount, quality, and diversity of exotic and status goods accumulated in the tombs, but also by the amount of time and labor that would have gone into making and acquiring them. (Shimada 2000, p. 56)

All together, the construction of the monumental mound at Huaca Loro, the preparation of the East and West Tombs and performance of the associated rituals required careful and complex planning, and considerable material, labor resources and time, and suggests the elite's control and monopoly of power in society.

Secondly, the funerary practices of the Sicán suggest the existence of an elite lineage that used the new Sicán religion to demonstrate and maintain their power (Shimada et al. 2004). The Sicán elite used funerary practices as a way to symbolize their relationship to the divine. The sheer size and grandeur of the monumental mounds built above the elite tombs would have been awe-inspiring to Sicán citizens and a symbol the divine nature of the figures buried below. (Shimada et al. 2004) Colorful murals with religious iconography decorated ceremonial precincts in the temples of the mounds, establishing the sanctity of the ritual space, and reaffirming this connection of the buried elite below to the divine. (Nickle Arts Museum 2006, Shimada et al. 2004) Also, the principal personage of the East Tomb at Huaca Loro wears a mask identical to the Sicán Deity, which is another reference to his relationship to the Deity and the divine. (Shimada et al. 2004, p. 389) The construction itself of these monumental mounds served as a reminder of the elite's power and endurance, and combined with the symbolic use of Sicán religious iconography to justify the divine merits of the elite lineage, was an attempt by the Sicán elite to "preserve the status quo of inherited rights." (Shimada et al. 2004, p. 370) The funerary rites and rituals performed by the living lineage members served to further reinforce their lineage identity and the three-way relationship between the divine, the dead, and the living elite. (Shimada et al. 2004, p. 389)

==== Foreign trade ====
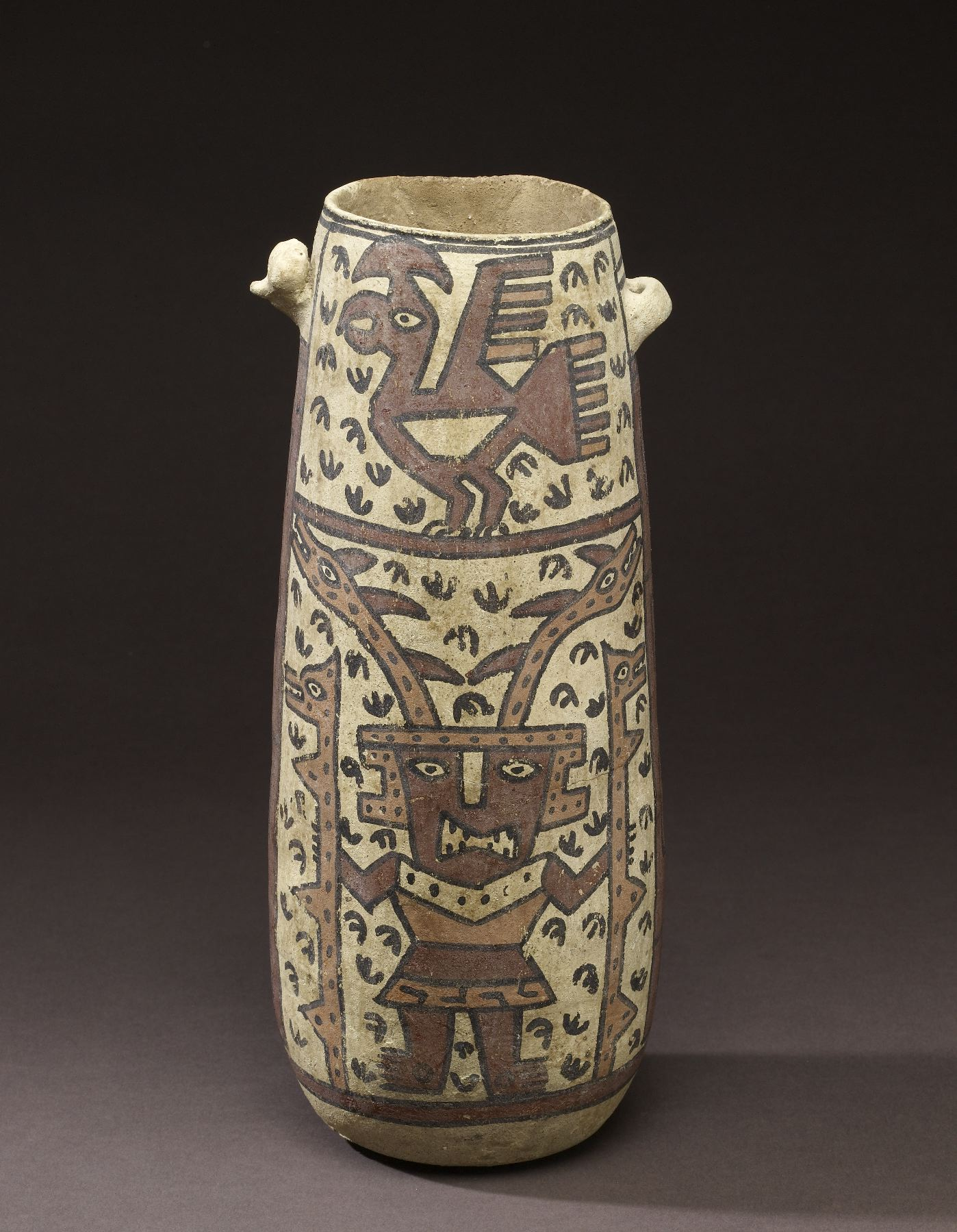
Chancay, vessel with the Sican god, Late Intermediate

The variety of grave goods suggests the wide range of power of the Middle Sican elite. They not only received the most grave offerings, but also the best quality and exotic offerings. None of the metalworking sites showed evidence of on-site mining of any of the materials. In addition, the spondylus shell, emeralds, feathers, and other minerals were imported to the area. Their materials came from mainly the northern Andes, such as Ecuador (from the Manteno and Milagro cultures), Peru, Colombia, but could have also reached as far south as the Tiwanaku empire in the south-central Andes and east to the Marañón River, a major tributary of the Amazon River. The Middle Sican trade networks appear to be unprecedented in range and goods involved, which helped to insure the spread of Sican religion and polity outside of the Lambayeque and La Leche valleys (Shimada 2000, p. 58). They also could have controlled the transport methods in addition to the goods being traded. The breeding and herding of llamas on the North Coast since the time of the Moche could have been utilized by the Sican to provide the goods as well as a caravan of llamas to transport the goods considerable distances (Shimada 1985, p. 391).

==== Religious cities and mounds ====
The Sicán culture is characterized by the establishment of religious cities with monumental temples. The religious capital city and cultural center of the Middle Sicán is referenced as the Sicán Precinct. (Bruhns 1994, p. 293). This T-shaped area is defined by monumental mounds of Huaca Loro, El Moscón, Las Ventanas, La Merced, and Abejas built between around AD 900 and 1050. The pyramidal monumental mounds were used as both burials sites for the elite and places of worship and ritual. The construction of the monumental mounds required considerable material, labor resources and time, indicating the Sicán elite's control and monopoly over the society's resources and manpower. They are a dramatic symbol of the power, wealth and permanence of the Middle Sicán elite and their theocratic state that dominated much of the north coast.

Two types of mounds are found in the Lambayeque Valley dating to the Sicán. The first type is the T-shaped mound, which is a relatively low mound with a short, central ramp providing direct access to the top of the mound. The second type is a relatively tall mound with steep sides and a zig-zagging ramp to provide circuitous access to the mound top. This second type also featured an enclosed structure at the top of the mound, likely for private rituals, whereas the first type of mound was likely for public rituals (Shimada 2000, p. 60; Shimada, Shinoda, Farnum, Corruccini, Watanabe 2004, p. 388). The mounds also covered and protected the shafts of tombs of elites underneath.

The Sicán used a walled-chamber-and-fill technique (which first appeared on the North Coast during Moche V) for constructing the monumental mound where the walls were created by adobe bricks and mortar in conjunction with chambers of superimposed lattices filled with refuse and other readily available materials. Marks on the adobe bricks used to make the mounds are indications of the patrons donating materials and/or labor for the construction of the temples (Shimada 2000, p. 60). This construction technique required "large-scale, unified construction with centrally pooled materials and labor force" (Shimada 2000 p. 60). It allowed for rapid erection of monumental buildings while minimizing labor and material investment and promoted the centralization of political and religious power in order to plan and complete these monumental mounds.

==== Agriculture and canals ====
While the Sican ceramics and metallurgy are vastly studied, agriculture during the Middle to Late Sican may have been linked to their increasing craft production. Shimada suggests that the canals at Pampa de Chaparri were developed by the Sican as part of an agro-industrial complex marked by an increase in mining and smelting operations, settlement growth, and the expansion of agriculture. Along the canals, 39 Middle Sican sites and 76 Late Sican sites were identified; however, few sites were located in the irrigation fields. This Sican occupation at the irrigation system points to its construction during the Middle Sican. The construction of this irrigation system, as well as the association of hierarchical social units and canal branches, coincides with the rapid and dramatic growth of the Middle Sican. Irrigation for agriculture was a necessity for the Sican elite to produce a surplus of food to feed artisans and laborers, who in turn support the elites.

=== Late Sican ===
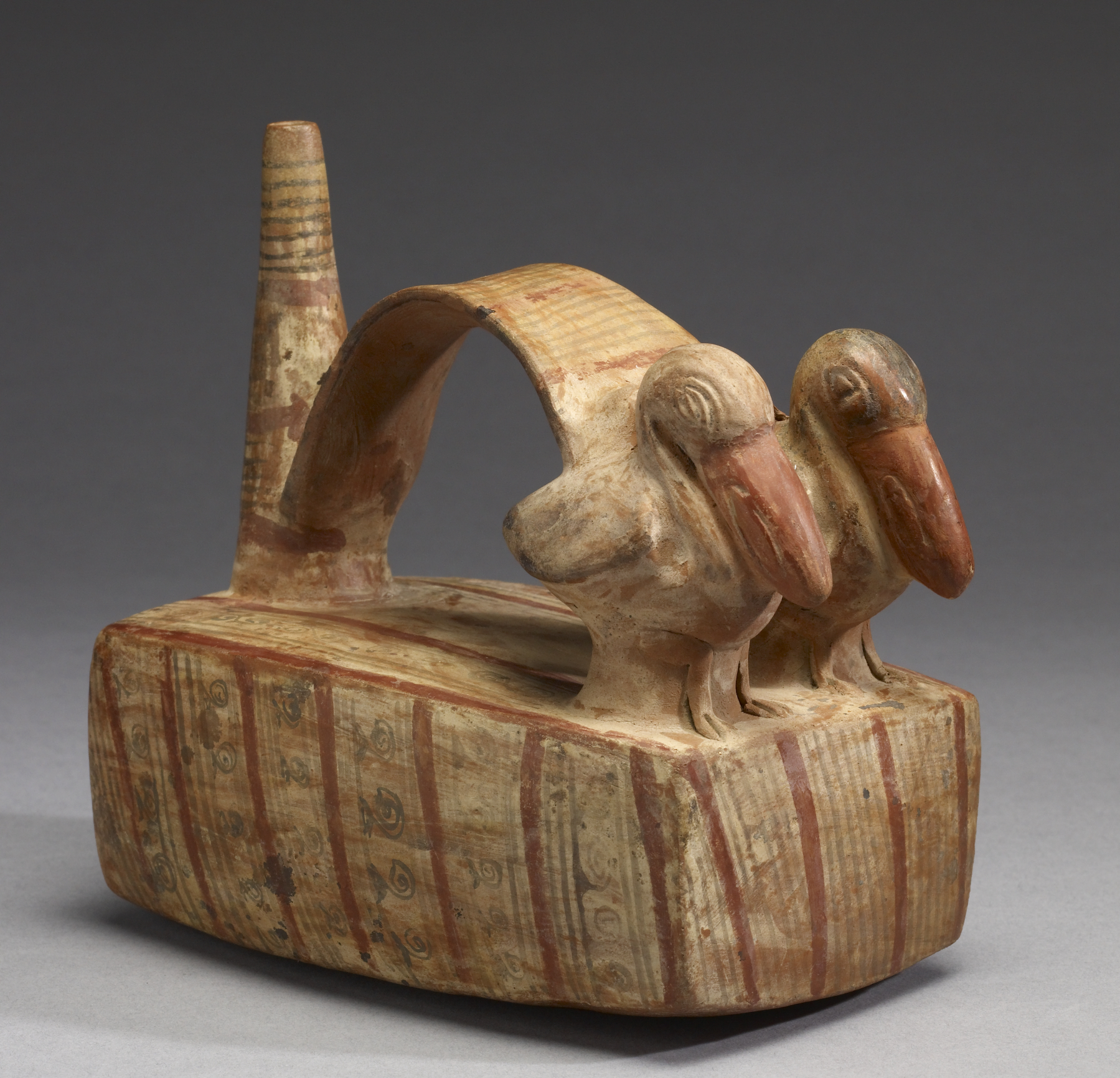
Double-Whistle Vessel with Sea Birds, 850-1350

The Late Sican period began around 1100 and ended with the conquest of the Lambayeque region by the Chimú kingdom of Chimor circa 1375.

==== Abandonment of Sican and Batán Grande ====
Around 1020, a major drought lasting 30 years occurred at Sican. At the time of the drought, the Sican Deity, so closely tied to the ocean and water in general, was at the center of Sican religion. The catastrophic changes in weather were thus linked to the Sican Deity, mainly to the failure of the Sican Deity to mediate nature for the Sican people. The Sican ceremonies (and temples/mounds on which they were performed) were supposed to ensure that there was an abundance of nature for the people. The elites were the mediators between the common people and the Sican Deity, as the Sican Deity was the mediator between nature and the Sican people. After 30 years of uncertainty in respect to nature, the temples that were the center of Middle Sican religion and elite power were burned and abandoned between 1050 and 1100. Perhaps the ancestor cult and aggrandizing of the elites caused too much resentment. Coupled with the drought that surely weakened agriculture in the area, the tolerance of the common population plummeted, forcing the removal of the political and religious leadership at Sican to save the people. There was little or no repair of the destruction of Sican, and further damage was inflicted by El Nino floods around 1100.

==== New Sican ====
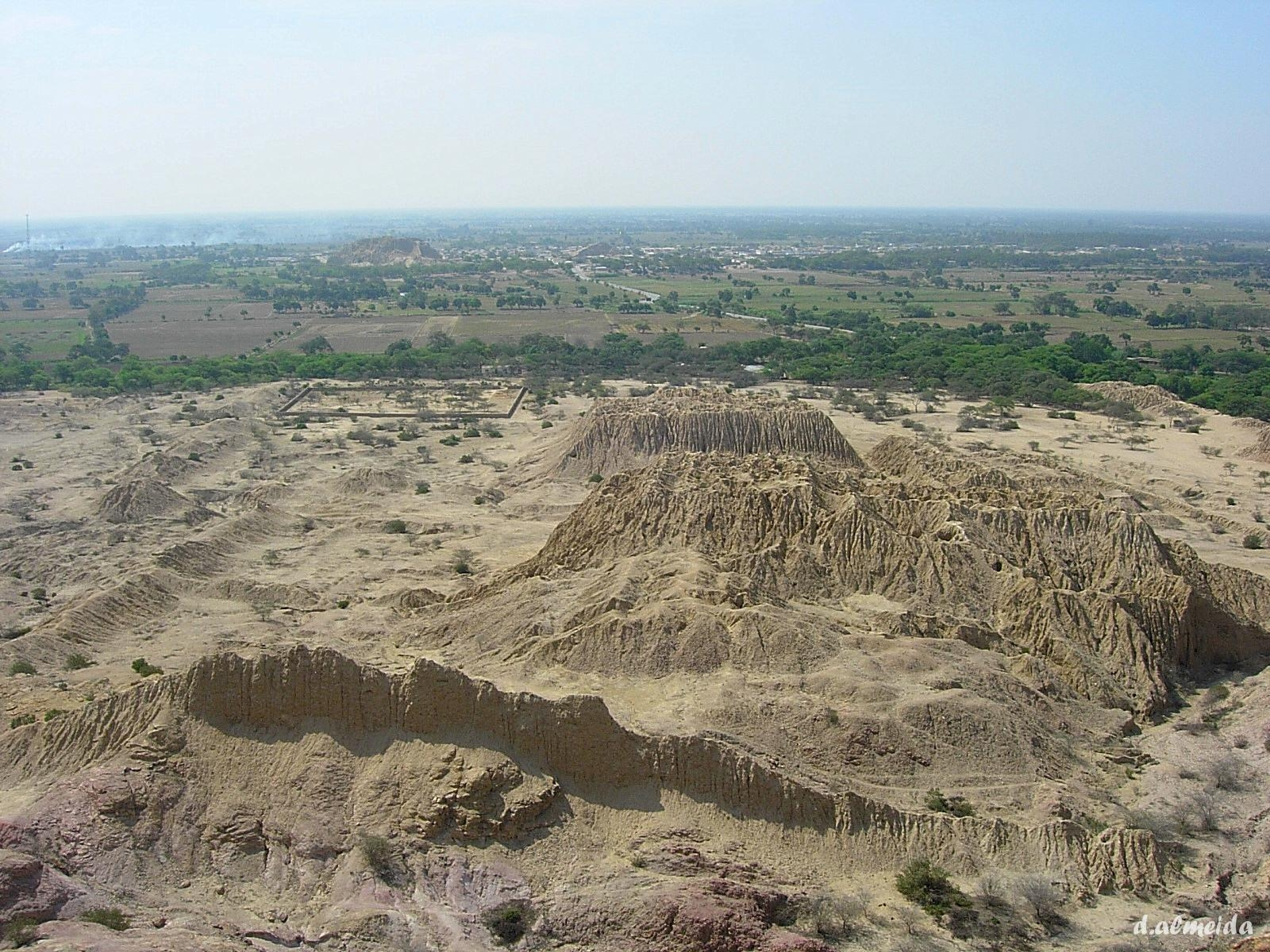
The Valley of Túcume in Peru contains 26 pyramids

The burning and abandonment of the previous capital meant that a new capital needed to be built. Túcume or "el Purgatorio" was constructed as the new Late Sican capital at the juncture of the La Leche and Lambayeque Valleys. Túcume became the new religious and ceremonial center of the Sican. The religious and iconographic legacies of the Middle Sican abruptly disappeared. It is at this juncture, when the Sican Deity and Sican Lord disappear from art, is when the Late Sican begins. Other mythical depictions from the Middle Sican continued in the Late Sican and reflect the revitalization of the religion going back to tradition relationships with nature. Icons include felines, fish, and birds that were secondary to the Sican Deity during the previous era, but were also linked to previous cultures in the area. Sican material culture, such as ceramics and metallurgy, unrelated to religion or politics did not suffer a severe change during the Middle Sican to Late Sican transition. Agriculture and irrigation were also not affected by the transition of political and religious power, as evidenced by the lack of effects on Pampa de Chaparri and numerous large urban hill-side settlements.

==== Túcume ====
Túcume took on the religious and ceremonial prestige as the site of Sican claimed during the Middle Sican. The mounds and temples from the Middle Sican were continued into the Late Sican since the idea of mounds were not associated with the fall of the Middle Sican, only those mounds in Batán Grande. The same types of ceremonial and religious artifacts made from the same materials were found at Túcume. The site grew enormously during its 250-year Late Sican occupation. By the time of the Chimú conquest of the Lambayeque region in 1375, there were 26 major mounds and enclosures. The site is built on 220 hectares around the La Raya Mountain. Túcume is seen as the reorganization and reunification of the Sican elite and Sican population as a whole until the fall of the Sican to the Chimú.

== See also ==
- Bosque de Pómac Historic Sanctuary
- Iperú Tourist Information and Assistance
- Tourism in Peru
- Bibliography of Lambayeque
