= Tumi =

Ceremonial axe used by Incas and other tribes

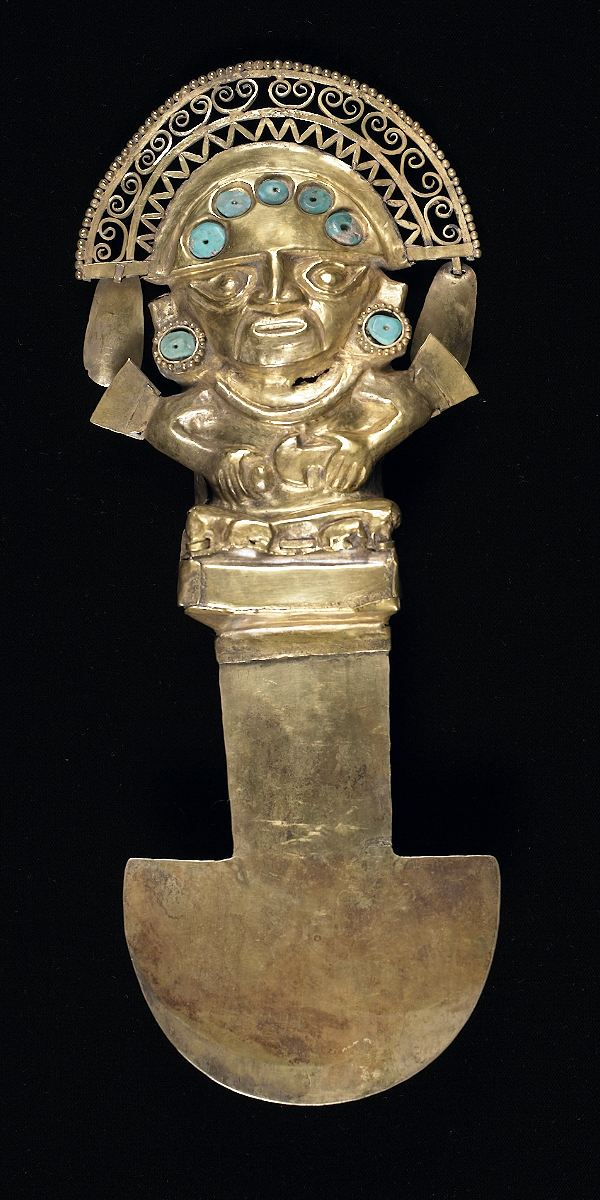
Early/Middle Sican tumi knife, 750–1100 AD, held at the Birmingham Museum of Art, it portrays the Sican Lord who abruptly disappeared from Sican art in the Late Sican phase (1100–1375)

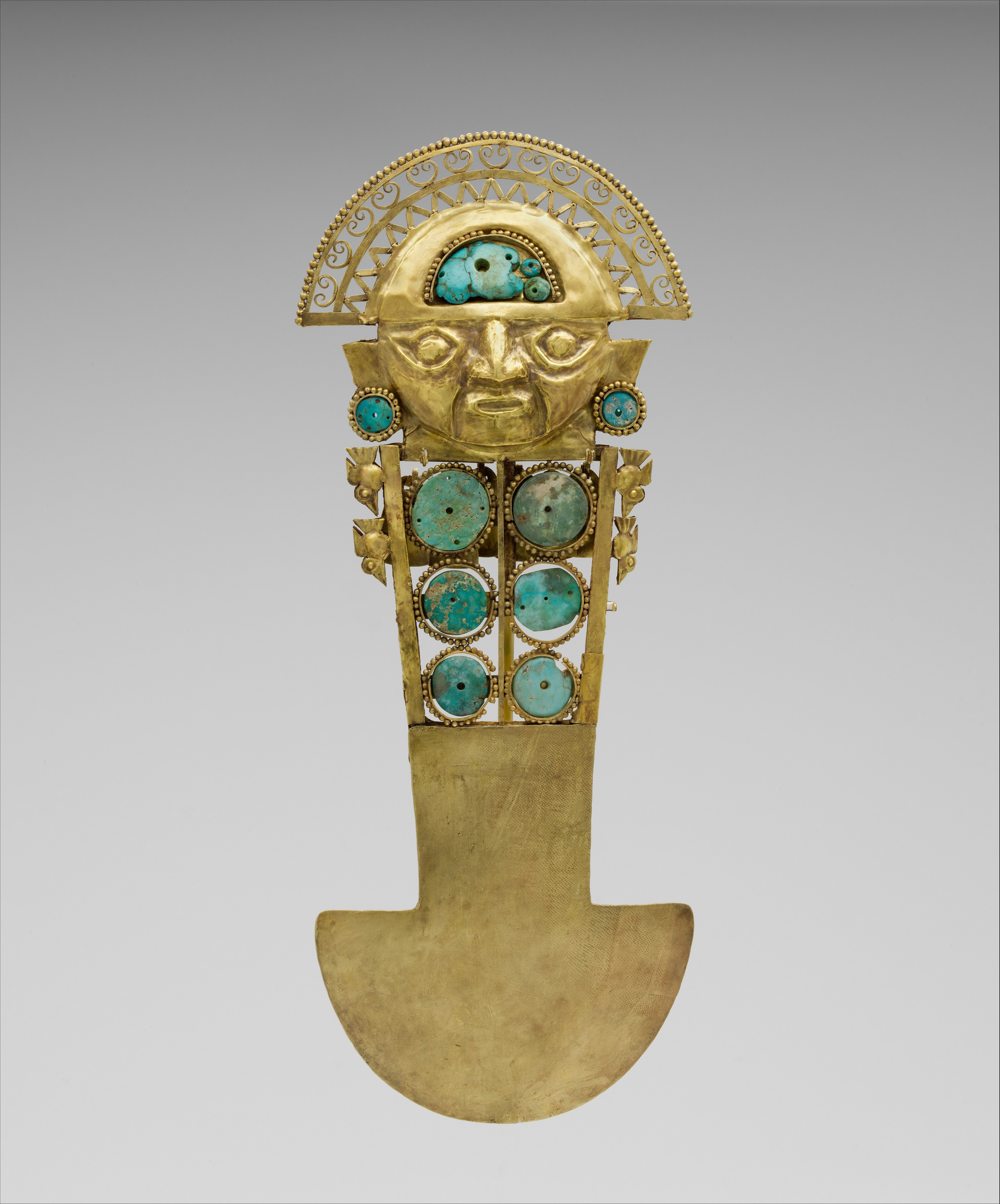
Sican Culture ceremonial knife (tumi) from the Metropolitan Museum of Art, New York City

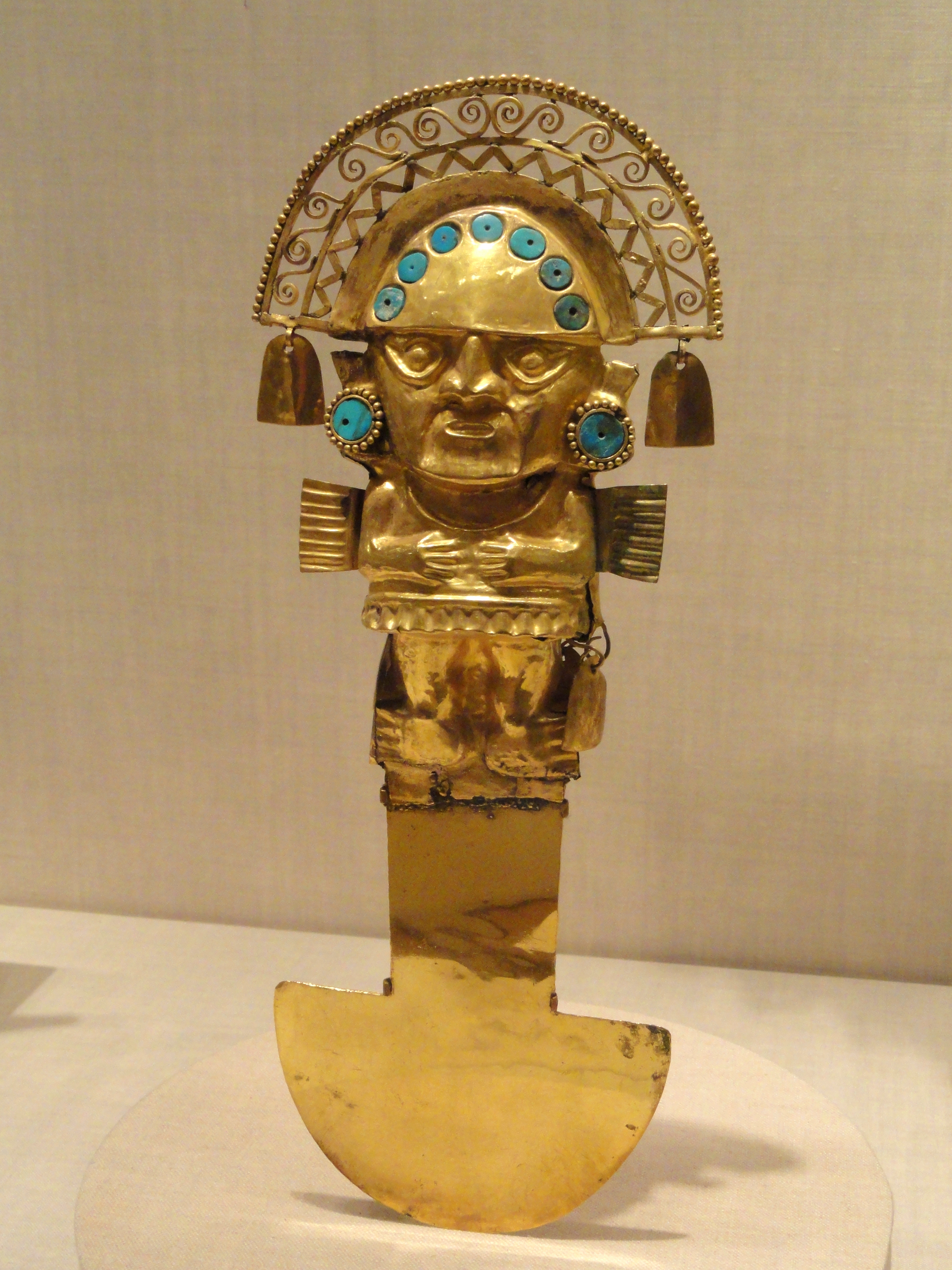
Sican-style tumi, 750–1100 AD, from the north coast of Peru, gold with turquoise, exhibited in the Art Institute of Chicago

Tumi (Quechua for 'knife', variants: tome, tume) is a generic term encompassing the many kinds of sharp tools utilized in pre- and post-colonial eras of the Central Andes region. Tumis were employed for a diverse set of purposes including as kitchen knives, agricultural tools, secondary weapons of warriors and hunters, sacrificial knives, barber implements, pendants, and medical tools. In addition, the tumi form, in metal, was used as a type of coin. Pre-columbian tumis were usually made of metal or stone.

== Overview ==
Perhaps the highly ornate ax-shaped ceremonial tumis made by the north coastal Peruvian cultures are the most widely acknowledged, characterized by a semi-circular blade, made of either bronze, copper, gold-alloy, silver alloy or wood and often inlayed with semi-precious stones such as lapis lazuli. Sacrificial tumis are most often associated with Pre-Inca cultures in the Peruvian North Coastal Region and in some cases with the Inca culture itself. The most popular examples of ornamental tumis are associated with the Peruvian cultures of the Chimu and the Sican (also known as Lambayeque).

In Inca mythology, Incas were descendants of the Sun God Inti, who was worshipped annually with an extravagant celebration known as the 'Inti Raymi'rata (Quechua for "sun festival"), which is still alluded to today in the form of the Inti Raymi Festival. The festival took place at the end of the potato and maize harvest in order to thank the Sun for the abundant crops or to ask for better crops during the next season. During this important religious ceremony, the High Priest would sacrifice a completely black or white llama. Using a tumi, he would open the animal's belly and, with his hands, pull out its bowels, so that observing those elements he could foretell the future. Later, the animal and its parts were completely incinerated.

Thanks to archaeological research, it is known that Andean cultures such as the Paracas or Inca have used tumis for the neurological procedure of skull trepanation. Many of these operations were carefully performed, suggesting that the surgery was done for the relief of some body disturbance other than that associated with injury, perhaps an organic or mental condition. The functional tumi knives used by cultures of Peru, such as the Paracas, different in composition to those highly ornamental tumis of the Lambayeque and Chimu, as the ornate tumis from these cultures were only functional in a symbolic ceremonial manner, due to the use of soft metals. These soft metals would not have allowed for the actual killing of animal or cutting of any kind of flesh.

In the Peruvian north coastal area, ornate tumi knives were produced for ritual use by elite members of society which included them being used in elite burial ceremonies. On November 21, 2006, archaeologists announced that they had unearthed 22 graves in northern Peru containing pre-Inca artifacts. Among the artifacts were the first semi-circular metallic tumi knives ever discovered by archaeologists. All previous examples had been recovered from grave looters.

In 1936, a Sican tumi was discovered in the valley of Batan Grande, Illimo, Lambayeque, Peru. It is really more an ax than a knife with a weight of 992 grams, height 41 cm. This tumi is believed to have the figure of Naylamp on its top, as many Sican culture's tumis are thought to have a depiction of this symbolic figure. Naylamp was a mythic hero and founder of the Sican culture, also known as Lambayeque culture, that was begotten from a totemic bird with his same name, Ñaylamp. The legend goes, that when Ñaylamp died, or disappeared, after founding the Lambayeque culture, he grew wings and flew into the sky. This hero-king founder of Lambayeque built a temple named Chot where he placed a large stone that he called Llampallec, which means statue of Ñaylamp. In this temple many ceremonies and rituals were offered using a tumi. The tumi of Illimo is represented with a mask of a bird, wings and bird shaped eyes. The mythic stories about the bird named Ñaylamp and the hero warrior founder of Lambayeque are represented in the tumi of Illimo by a birdman. Sican's tumi knives often include depictions of birds or winds in order to symbolize Ñaylamp as well. Portrayals of Naylamp, the "Sican Lord", abruptly disappear from Sican art in the Late Sican phase (1100–1375). is believed Sican goes through a phase of revitalization of the religion going back to traditional relationships with nature, icons include felines, fish, and birds as the main focus that were secondary to the Sican Deity and the Sican Lord during the previous eras, but were also linked to previous cultures in the area.

In modern Peru, to hang a tumi on a wall means good luck. The tumi is the national symbol of Peru and has become a symbol used in Peruvian tourism publicity and can be found depicted on tourist gifts such as mugs and key chains.

== See also ==
- Battle axe
- Tumebamba
- Ulu
