= Hans Heinrich Brüning =

German-born Peruvian ethnologist

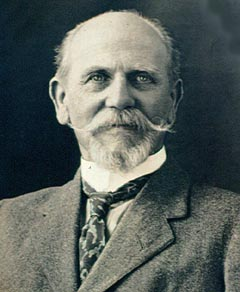
Hans Heinrich Brüning

Hans Heinrich (Enrique) Brüning (Aug. 20, 1848, Hoffeld - July 2, 1928, Bordesholm) was a German-born Peruvian ethnologist and collector of antiquities.

== Life and career ==
Brüning was educated as a mechanical engineer. At the age of 27, he decided to emigrate to Peru, where he immediately found employment as a mechanic on a sugar plantation in Pátapo.

His interest in archaeology apparently began in 1883 when he met Adolph Bandelier, a specialist in pre-Hispanic buildings. Following that meeting, he spent many years travelling in Peru taking photographs of ancient buildings and the local inhabitants. He took more than 2,000 photos on glass negatives, which are still preserved. After that, he began collecting archaeological pieces such as ceramics, metals, precious stones and carvings in wood. It was at this time that he decided to make a brief, formal study of ethnography and archaeology back in Germany, returning to Peru in 1898.

=== Ethnology ===
In 1902, Brüning joined a risky expedition to find the shortest route between the Marañon basin and the Pacific coast. Together with the Polish engineer Eduardo de Habich and the landowner Manuel Antonio Mesones Muro, they found a passage through the Pongo de Manseriche. Brüning made the most of the opportunity to write an ethnographic description of the indigenous Aguarunas.

The Moches resisted his efforts to study them, but Brüning was patient and eventually gained their confidence by participating in their local rituals. This success led him to remain in the vicinity and study the Mochica language. He completed a dictionary of the language that was published in 1917. Some wax cylinders were obtained, which he used to record Mochican music. Today the originals are kept in the Hamburgisches Museum Für Völkerkunde. They are among the first recordings of popular music made in Peru.

=== Antiquities ===
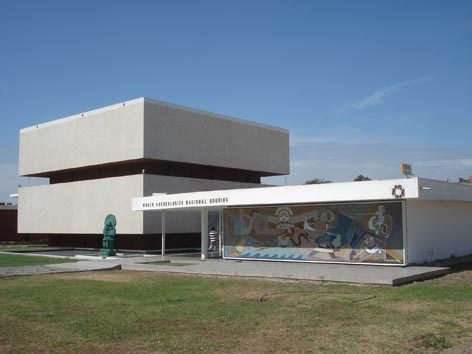
Brüning Museum

By 1916, the ceramic pieces he had collected would no longer fit in his home. He decided to sell part of his collection to the Peruvian government for 60,000 Soles. They were put on display in 1924 and he was named the museum's first director (with a salary of four Soles per month), but his tenure was short because he was in poor health, which prompted him to return to Germany for good in 1925. His full collection is now displayed at the Museo Arqueologico Nacional Brüning in Lambayeque, which opened in 1966.

=== Death ===
He died of a heart attack on July 2, 1928, in the city of Bordesholm, within a few days of his eightieth birthday.

== Works ==
- Mochica Wörterbuch = Diccionario Mochica : Mochica-Castellano, Castellano-Mochica, edited with an introduction by José Antonio Salas García, Universidad de San Martín de Porres, Escuela Profesional de Turismo y Hotelería (2004) ISBN 9972-541-19-3
- Estudios monográficos del Departamento de Lambayeque, compiled by James M. Vreeland, Jr., with an introduction by Richard P. Schaedel, Sociedad de Investigación de la Ciencia, Cultura y Arte Norteño (c1989)
- Fotodokumente aus Nordperu von Hans Heinrich Brüning, selected and edited by Corinna Raddatz, Hamburgisches Museum für Völkerkunde (1990)
