= Brüning Museum =

Peruvian archaeological museum

Coordinates: 6°42′14″S 79°54′14″W

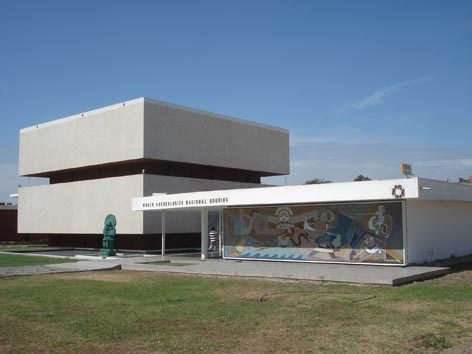
Brüning Museum

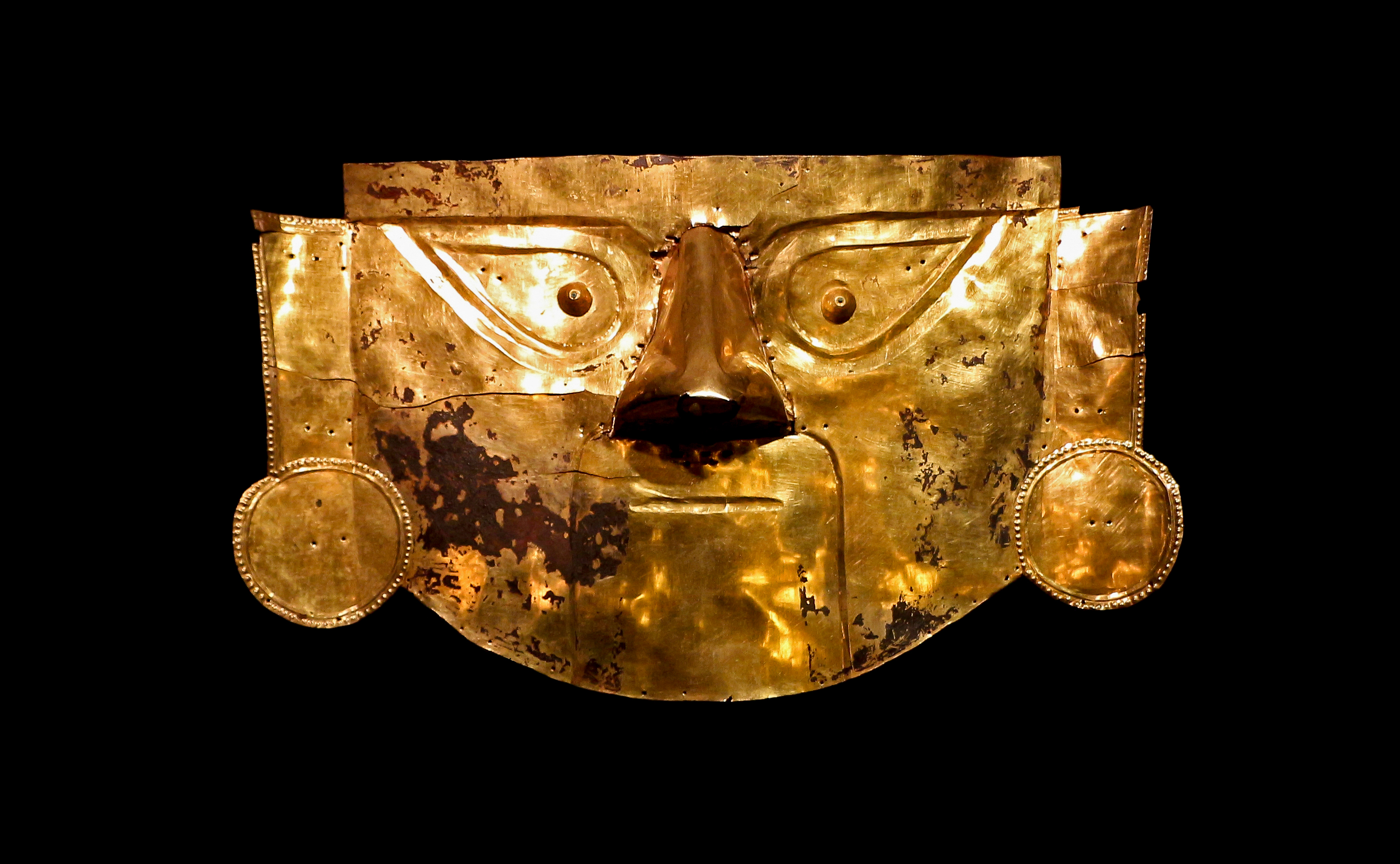
Lambayeque funerary gold mask in Brüning Museum

The Brüning Museum, also known as Museo Regional Arqueológico Enrique Bruning de Lambayeque, was inaugurated in 1966 and it is located in two blocks of the principal park in Lambayeque, Peru. It was based on the collections of Hans Heinrich Brüning, a German researcher.

It is an excellent museum based on the collections that Bruning gathered at the end of the 19th century and the first decades of the 20th century. The Peruvian government acquired this collection from Bruning in 1924. This museum has been constantly enriched by pieces obtained in confiscations, donations and discoveries. The most recent procurement are the pieces acquired in the Tomb of the "Lord of Sipán". His remains and the mortuary trousseau are displayed at the museum. The Golden Room shows up to 500 works of art.

The museum was constructed as a modern and functional facility, inspired by the works of the 20th-century French architect, Le Corbusier. The more than 1500 pieces come from different indigenous cultures, including an invaluable textile collection and ceramics of Chimú and Vicús. Thousands of golden objects are kept in sealed rooms, including funeral masks of copper, ceremonial vessels, an extraordinary necklace and jewelry of Mochica and Chimú cultures, as well as pieces of the Lambayeque culture.

In the gardens of the museum is a statue dedicated to the mythical figure of Naylamp, founder of the Lambayecanos Kings' dynasty. The front facade has a mural with Lambayecanos motifs. The interior of the principal building is a sequence of four levels, which in total exhibit more than 1,400 archaeological pieces. These represent the Lambayeque, Moche, Chavín, Vicús, Inca cultures and others. Some of the most important pieces date to more than 10,000 years ago.

== See also ==
- List of museums in Peru
