= Iperú =

Government agency of Peru

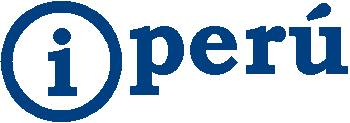

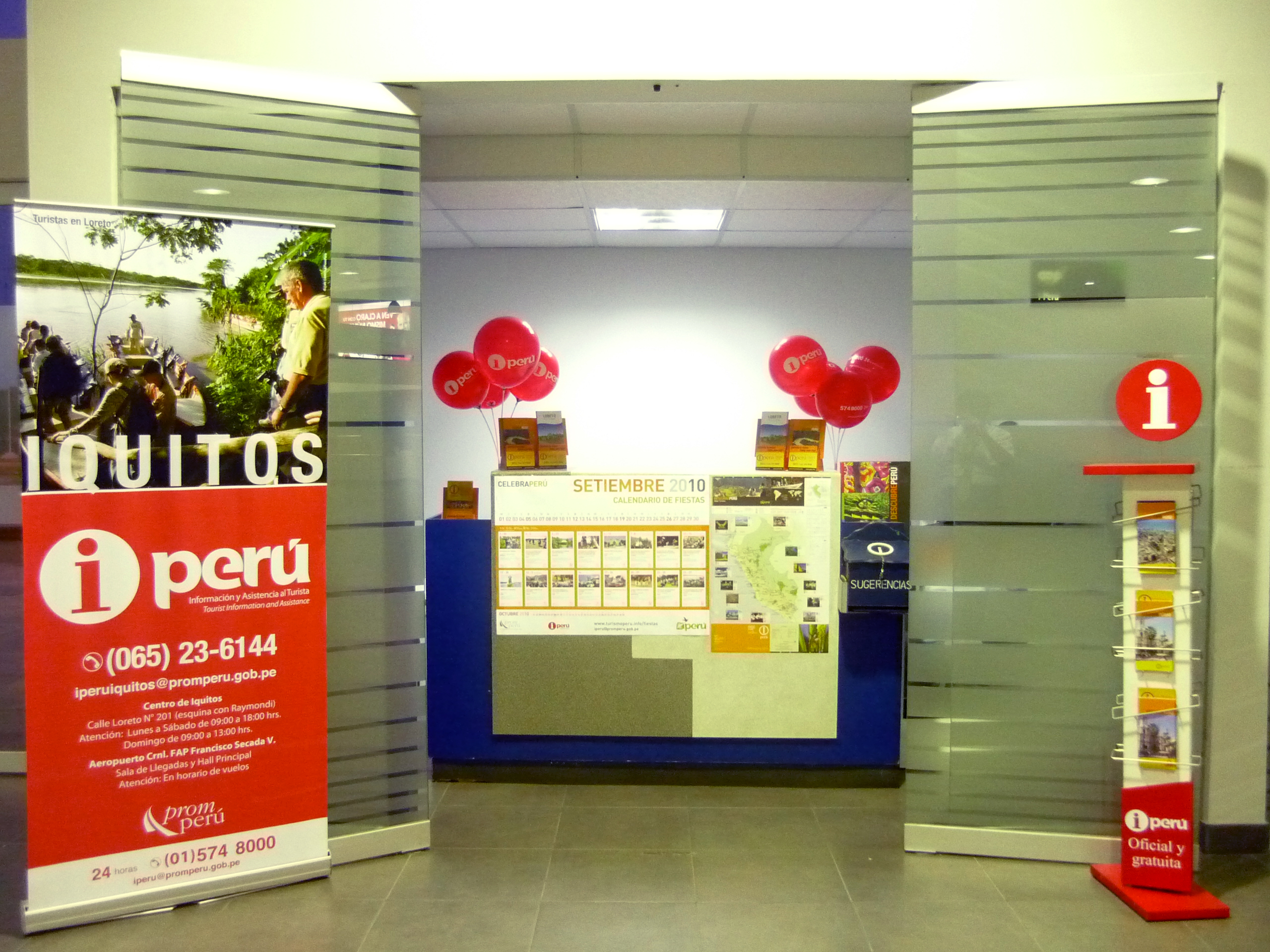
- Iperú office at Iquitos International Airport
- Formation: 24 June 1994; 32 years ago
- Headquarters: Lima, Peru
- Region served: Nationwide
- Official language: Spanish, English and sometimes others, with publications in several other languages.
- Affiliations: Promperú and INDECOPI
- Website: www.peru.travel/en/

Iperú Tourist Information and Assistance, or simply Iperú (with lower-case p) (Spanish pronunciation: [ipeˈɾu]) is the Peru tourism office provided since 1994 by the Peruvian government through the Commission for the Promotion of Exports and Tourism of Peru (Spanish: Comisión de Promoción de las Exportaciones y el Turismo del Perú, Promperú) and the National Institute for Defense of Competition and Protection of Intellectual Property (INDECOPI), to provide domestic and foreign travelers with objective and impartial information as well as support services. The organization's logo is the international tourist information symbol, a lower-case white "i" inside a blue circle, followed by "perú".

The Iperú headquarters are in Lima, and there are multilingual offices throughout the country.

During 2007, Iperú handled 287,492 cases, including requests for information and for assistance or both, all over Peru.

== Functions ==
Iperú has three core purposes:

- To provide visitor information.
- To advise tourists on relevant paperwork and procedures required by public and private institutions.
- To contribute to the resolution of complaints from tourists against operators of tourist services.

Iperú provides free information and services for various sorts of travelers to and within Peru – including tourists, businesspeople and academics – before, during, and even after their trip. The organization has a comprehensive database of registered tourism services in the country, as well as information about places, attractions, routes, and travel times. Iperú also provides assistance in cases of problems arises during a trip or if tourist services are not provided as hired. Iperú is responsible for handling claims submitted by tourists against the suppliers of tourism services, with mediating and conciliatory (but not punitive) powers to resolve them.

== History ==
A cooperation agreement on 24 June 1994 between Promperú and INDECOPI established the Tourist Protection Service (Servicio de Protección al Turista, SPT). Through this agreement, INDECOPI gave to the new bureau the functions of the earlier Consumer Protection Commission (Comisión de Protección al Consumidor, CPC) in cases against tourism companies.

In 2001, noting the need for objective tourist information to visitors in order to prevent adverse incidents and improve the services provided by SPT, it was decided to add the Tourist Information Service (Servicio de Información Turística, SIT).

Merging the functions of both services gave rise to Iperú Tourist Information and Assistance.

== Accessibility ==
The Iperú headquarters are in Lima, and there are operations in 12 Peruvian regions, with 30 local offices as of January 2009, which are usually named with the city in which they are located (e.g., the Iperú office in Iquitos (Peruvian Amazon), is Iperú Iquitos). Despite being a governmental organization, is accessible in person, by phone and by e-mail 24 hours a day, every day of the week and year. Operators of Iperú typically speak Spanish and English, and some are fluent in other languages. Local offices can typically handle 5 or more languages with staff on hand at any given time, and provide published materials in Spanish, English, French, German, Italian, Russian and Chinese.

In popular locales, Iperú installs kiosks of tourist information on events or places with large influx of visitors and foreign nationals, such as the celebration of the Inti Raymi in Cusco and the Patronal Feast of Saint John in Iquitos in the Peruvian Amazon.

=== List of offices ===
Iperú operates 14 offices around the country, in Amazonas, Ancash, Arequipa, Ayacucho, Cajamarca, Cusco, Lambayeque, La Libertad, Lima, Loreto, Piura, Puno, Tacna and Tumbes.

== See also ==
- Tourism in Peru
- Visitor center
