= Department of Lambayeque =

Department of Peru

Coordinates: 6°26′S 79°52′W

Lambayeque Lampalliqi (Quechua)
- Department
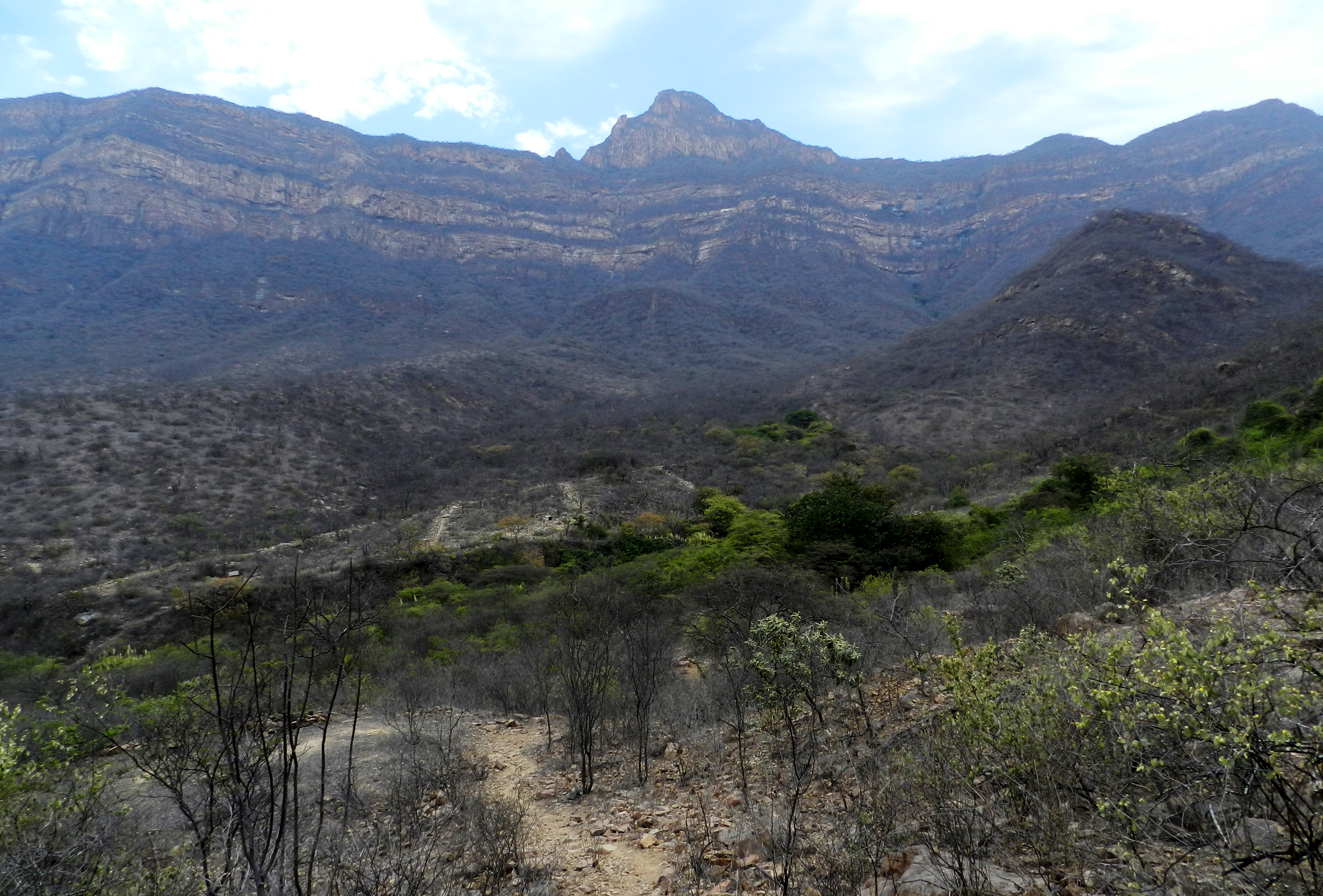
- Chaparrí Conservation Area

- Flag Coat of arms
- Motto(s): Lucis gloriam et honoris (Light, glory and honor)
- Location of Lambayeque within Peru
- Interactive map of Lambayeque
- Country: Peru
- Established: December 1, 1874
- Named for: Lambayeque
- Capital: Chiclayo
- Provinces: List: Chiclayo; Ferreñafe; Lambayeque

Government
  - Type: Regional Government
  - Governor: Jorge Pérez Flores
  - Senator: Alejandro Aguinaga (FP)

Area
  - Total: 14,231.3 km^{2} (5,494.7 sq mi)
- Highest elevation: 3,078 m (10,098 ft)
- Lowest elevation: 0 m (0 ft)

Population (2025)
  - Total: 1,404,376
  - Density: 98.6822/km^{2} (255.586/sq mi)
- Demonym: lambayecano/a
- Time zone: UTC-5 (Peru time)
- UBIGEO: 14
- Dialing code: 074
- ISO 3166 code: PE-LAM
- Principal resources: Rice, sugarcane, cotton and fruits
- Poverty rate: 30%
- Percentage of Peru's GDP: 3.89%
- Website: www.regionlambayeque.gob.pe

Lambayeque (Spanish pronunciation: [lambaˈʝeke]; Quechua: Lampalliqi) is a department of Peru. Located in the country's northwest, it is known for its rich Moche and Chimú historical past. It is the second-smallest department in Peru after Tumbes, but it is also its most densely populated department and its eighth most populous department. It is administered by a regional government. Its capital is Chiclayo.

== Etymology ==
The name Lambayeque is a Spanish derivation of the Mochica word for god Yampellec (Ñampaxllæc), said to have been worshipped by the first Lambayeque king, Naymlap. The Spanish gave the name to the early people. It is known as Lampalliqi in Cajamarca–Cañaris Quechua.

== Geography ==
The vast plains that make up the department of Lambayeque's territory are watered by rivers that originate in the Andes; cultivation is only possible in a small portion of this parched region with irrigation. The fertile river valleys produce half of the sugar cane crop of Peru. In addition, Lambayeque and the department of Piura provide most of the rice crops consumed in Peru.

Increased agricultural harvest is expected with completion of the Olmos Transandino Project. The water supply project will transfer up to 2 billion m^{3} annually of water from the Huancabamba River in the department of Cajamarca east of Lambayeque.

In the smaller scale farming of earlier centuries, the Olmos Carob Tree Forest supported goat herds that fed on carobs. The fine goatskins were tanned to create the fine, pale, leather known as "cordoban" or "cordovan", from the Spanish town of Córdoba, where the process was developed. Goat fat was used to make soap.

There are two small islands off the Pacific coast of the department of Lambayeque: Lobos de Afuera, and Lobos de Tierra; there was a dispute with the department of Piura over ownership of the latter island.

The region is bordered by the Piura Region on the north, the Cajamarca Region on the southeast, the La Libertad Region on the south and the Pacific Ocean on the west.

== History ==
Legend tells that in ancient times, a great float of balsa rafts arrived at the beaches of the existing San José cove. Formed by a brilliant cortege of nine foreign warriors, this float was led by a man of great talent and courage, named Naymlap, the mythical founder of the first northwest civilization.

Among the descendants of Naymlap were the Moche and the Chimú, the latter builders of a civilization forged in Lambayeque before being conquered by the later Inca Empire. The Chimú grew to acquire a state parallel to the Inca. The Chimú moved their capital to the northern area, establishing urban centers there. They were farmers, textile experts and, wonderful goldsmiths, with extraordinary works in gold.

The Inca conquest of what today is Lambayeque, lasted almost four decades. Pachacuti, Tupac Inca Yupanqui and Huayna Cápac, successively, ruled during the process.

In the 16th century, the Spaniard leader Francisco Pizarro took his conquistadors across the region on the way to Cajamarca to conclude the defeat of the Inca empire. He was amazed by the gold exposed in vases and utensils.

During Colonial times, a rivalry started between the people of the towns of Lambayeque and Santiago de Miraflores de Saña. The reason of the conflict was the opulence in which the latter lived, even provoking the greed of pirates. A flood in 1720, however, destroyed Saña and marked the end of a flourishing city.

The people of Lambayeque followed Juan Manuel Iturregui as their leader in the struggles for emancipation and independence from Spain. He spread the libertarian ideas and helped get arms for the cause.

=== Archaeology ===
In November 2019, Peruvian archaeologists led by Walter Alva discovered a 3,000-year-old, 130 feet long megalithic 'water cult' temple with 21 tombs in the Oyotún district in the Zaña Valley. Archaeologists assumed that the temple was abandoned around 250 BC and later used as a burial ground by the Chumy people. Twenty of the tombs belonged to the people of Chumy, and one to an adult male buried during the Formative period with a ceramic bottle with two spouts and a bridge handle. According to the excavations, as many as three construction phases took place in the temple: the first was between 1500 BC–800 BC, when people built the foundations of the building from cone-shaped clay; second, between 800 BC–400 BC, when the megalithic temple was built under the influence of the pre-Inca civilization known as the Chavin; and finally 400 BC–100 BC, when people added circular pillars used to hold the roof of the temple.

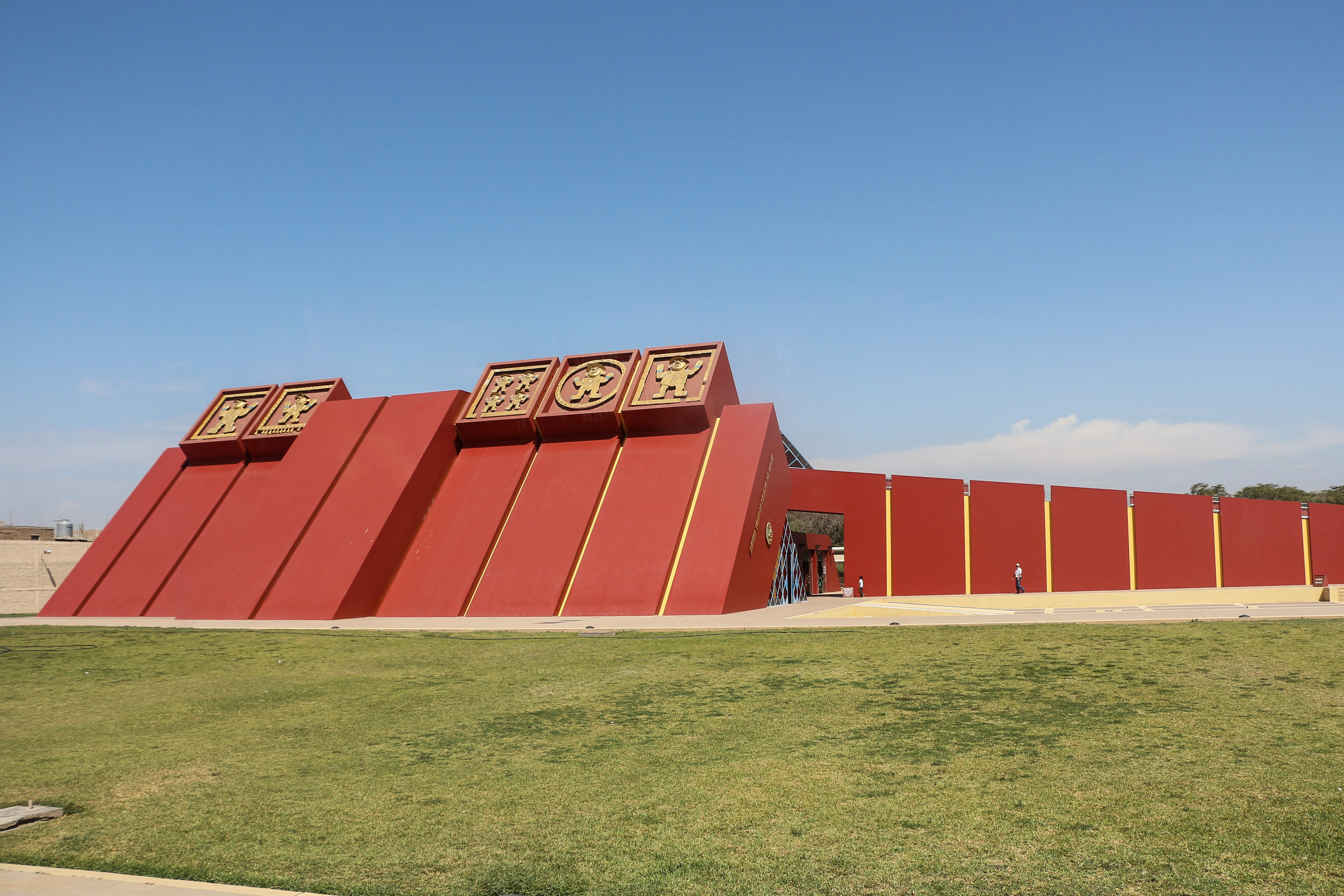
Sipán Museum, in Lambayeque

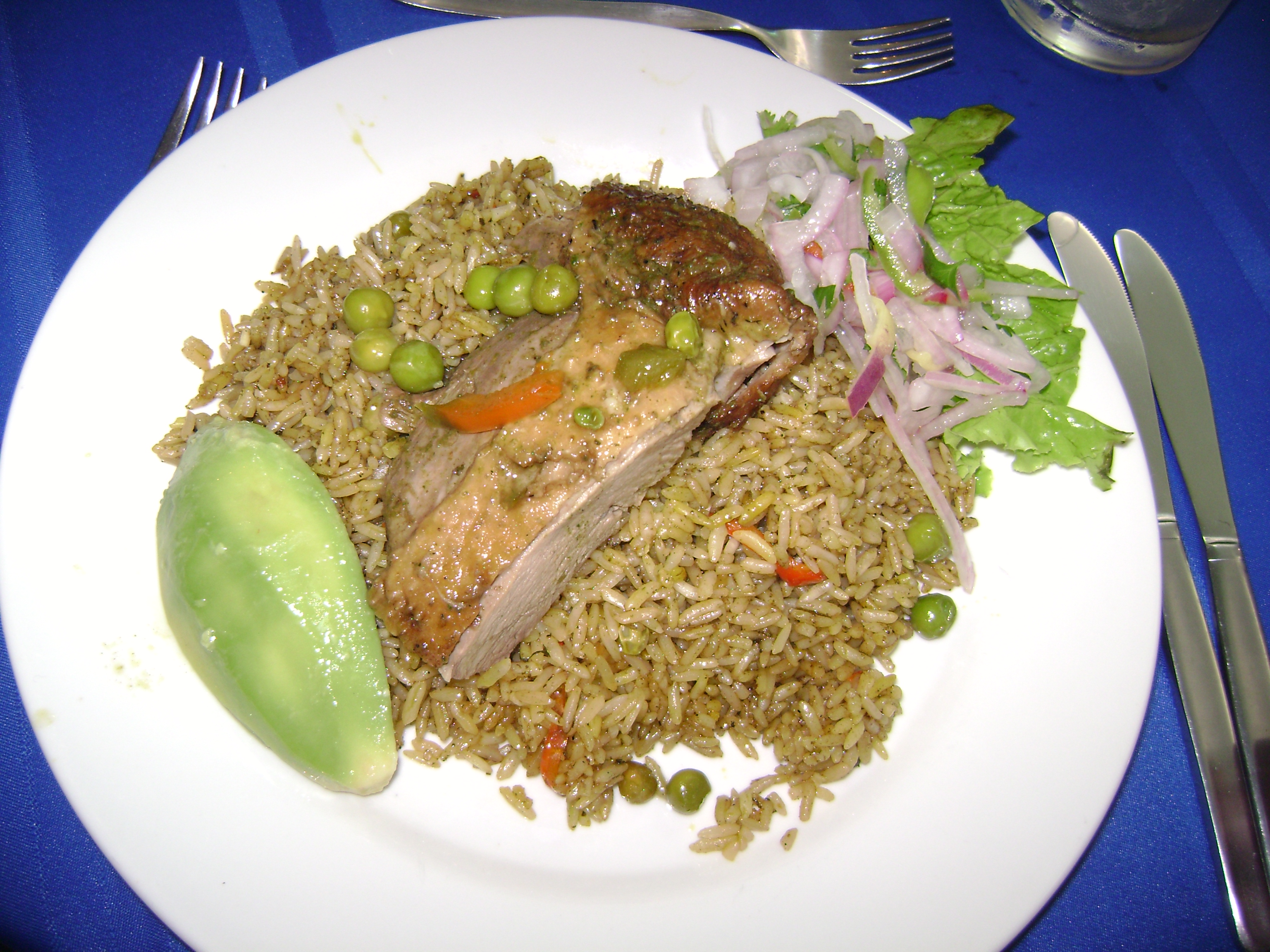
Presentation of a dish of Arroz con pato

== Political division ==
Map of provinces

The department is divided into 3 provinces (provincias, singular: provincia), which are composed of 38 districts (distritos, singular: distrito). The provinces, with their capitals in parentheses, are:

- Chiclayo (Chiclayo)
- Ferreñafe (Ferreñafe)
- Lambayeque (Lambayeque)

== Places of interest ==
- Pómac Forest Historical Sanctuary
- Tucume Pyramids

== Music from Lambayeque ==
The most famous composer from Lambayeque was Luis Abelardo Nuñez, born in Ferreñafe on 22 November 1926. His songs are among the most popular ones in Peruvian music. These included the following:

- "Marinera norteña", Los Troveros Criollos
- Waltz: "Porqué no volverás?"
- Waltz: "Embrujo"

== See also ==
- Bibliography of Lambayeque
