= List of rivers of Peru =

This is a list of rivers of Peru, that are at least partially in Peru. The Peruvian government has published guidelines for the preparation of river flow studies in April 2015.

== Longest rivers ==
The lengths of the following 10 rivers are according to a 2005 statistical publication by the Instituto Nacional de Estadística e Informática listing the 44 most important rivers of Peru.

	River	Length (km)	Length (miles)	Outflow
1.	Ucayali	1,771	1100	Amazon
2.	Marañón	1,414	879	Amazon
3.	Putumayo	1,380	858	Amazon
4.	Yavarí	1,184	736	Amazon
5.	Huallaga	1,138	707	Marañón
6.	Urubamba	862	536	Ucayali
7.	Mantaro	724	450	Apurímac
8.	Amazon	713	443	Atlantic Ocean
9.	Apurímac	690	429	Ucayali
10.	Napo	667	414	Amazon
11.	Madre de Dios	655	407	Amazon

== By Drainage Basin ==
This list is arranged by drainage basin, with respective tributaries indented under each larger stream's name. Rivers longer than 400 kilometers are in bold font.

=== Atlantic Ocean ===
- **Amazon River**
  - Madeira River (Brazil)
    - **Madre de Dios River**
      - Orthon River (Bolivia)
        - Tahuamanu River
          - Muymano River
        - Mamuripi River
          - Manuripe River
      - Heath River
      - **Tambopata River**, 402 km
      - **Río de Las Piedras** or Tacuatimanu, 621 km
        - Pariamanu River
      - **Inambari River**, 437 km
      - Manú River
  - **Purús River**, 483 km
    - Acre River
    - Iaco River or Yaco
    - Chandless River
    - Curanja River
    - Alto Purús River
  - Juruá River or Yurua
    - Alto Yurua
  - **Putumayu**
    - Yaguas River
    - Algodón River
    - Campuya River
    - San Miguel River
  - **Yavarí River**
    - Yavarí Mirim River
    - Gálvez River
  - Atacuarí River
  - Pichana River
  - Apayacu River
  - **Napo River**
    - Mazán River
    - Tampuyaku River
    - **Curaray River**, 414 km
    - Aguarico River
  - Nanay River
    - Pintuyaku River
      - Chambira River
  - **Marañón River**
    - **Tigre River**, 598 km
      - **Corrientes River**, 483 km
      - Tangarana River
    - Samiria River
    - Chambira River
    - Urituyaku River
    - **Huallaga River**
      - Paranapura River
      - Shanusi River
      - Chipurana River
      - Mayo River
      - Biabo River or Biavo
      - Sisa River
      - Wallapampa River
        - Abiseo River
      - Mishollo River
      - Chuntayaq River
      - Tulumayu River
      - Monzón River
      - Higueras River
    - Nucuray River
    - Pastaza River
      - Huasaga River
    - **Morona River**, 402 km
    - Santiago River
    - Nieva River
    - Cenepa River
      - Comaina River
    - Chiriaco River or Imaza
    - Chinchipe River
    - Utcubamba River
      - Quebrada Magunchal
      - Quebrada Seca
    - Chamaya River
      - Wayllapampaa River
      - Chotano River
      - Quebrada San Antonio
    - Llaucano River
    - Crisnejas River or Crisnegas
      - Cajamarca River
      - Condebamba River
    - Chusgon River
    - San Miguel River
    - Puccha River
    - Nupe River
    - Lauricocha River
  - **Ucayali River**
    - **Tapiche River**, 448 km
    - Pacaya River
    - Guanache River
    - Cushabatay River
    - Pisqui River
    - Aguaytía River
    - Tamaya River
    - Pachitea River
      - Pichis River
      - Palcazu River
        - Pozuzo River
          - Huancabamba River or Huayabamba
    - Sheshea River or Chesheya or Chessea
    - Cohengu River
    - **Urubamba River**
      - Inuya River
      - Mishagua River
      - Camisea River
      - Yavero River or Paucartambo
      - Ticumpinia River
      - Cumpirusiato River
      - Cushireni River
      - Vilcanota River
    - Tambo River
      - Perené River
        - Pangoa River
          - Mazamari River
          - Satipo River
        - Paucartambo River
        - Chanchamayu
          - Tulumayu
      - Ene River
        - **Mantaro River**
          - Huarpa River
            - Yucay River or Pongor
          - Ichu River or Huancavelica
          - Occoro River
          - Willka River
          - Cunas River
        - **Apurímac River**
          - Pampas River
          - Pachachaka River
          - Santo Tomás River
          - Velille River

=== Altiplano ===
- Desaguadero River
  - Mauri River
  - Lake Titicaca
    - Ilave River
      - Huenque River
    - Coata River
    - Ramis River
      - Azángaro River
        - Carabaya River
      - Ayaviri River
    - Huancané River
    - Suches River

=== Pacific Ocean ===
- Zarumilla River
- Tumbes River
- Chira River
- Piura River
  - Bigote River
  - Charanal River
- Cascajal River
- Olmos River
- Motupe River
  - La Leche River
- Chancay River (Lambayeque)
- Zaña River
- Chamán River
- Jequetepeque River
- Chicama River
- Moche River
- Virú River
- Chao River
- Santa River
- Lacramarca River
- Nepeña River
- Casma River
  - Sechín River
  - Grande River
- Culebras River
- Huarmey River
- Fortaleza River
- Pativilca River
- Supe River
- Huaura River
- Chancay River (Huaral)
- Chillón River
- Rímac River
- Lurín River
- Mala River
- Omas River
- Cañete River
- Topara River
- San Juan River
- Pisco River
- Ica River
- Grande River or Nazca
- Acarí River
- Yauca River
- Indio Muerto or Chala
- Chaparra
- Atico
- Caravelí River
- Ocoña River
- Camaná River
  - Colca River
- Vitor River
  - Sihuas River
  - Quilca River or Chili
- Tambo River
  - Corlaque River
- Osmore River or Moquegua or Ilo

- Asana River

- Locumba River
- Sama River
- Caplina River

== Alphabetical list ==
- Acre River
- Aguarico River
- Amazon River
- Apurímac River
- Bigote River
- Camaná River
- Caplina River
- Cañete River
- Chamán River
- Chancay River (Lambayeque)
- Chancay River (Huaral)
- Charanal River
- Chao River
- Casma River
- Cenepa River
- Chambira River
- Chillón River
- Chinchipe River
- Chira River
- Colca River
- Comaina River
- Cunas River
- Desaguadero River
- Ene River
- Fortaleza River
- Heath River
- Huallaga River
- Huancabamba River
- Huarmey River
- Ilave River
- Javary River
- Juruá River
- Ica River
- Ilo River
- Jequetepeque River
- La Leche River
- Madre de Dios River
- Mala River
- Mantaro River
- Manú River
- Marañón River
- Mayo River
- Moche River
- Moquegua River
- Motupe River
- Napo River
- Nieva River
- Osmore River
- Palcazu River
- Perené River
- Pisco River
- Piura River
- Pozuzo River
- Putumayo River
- Purús River
- Quebrada Magunchal
- Quebrada Seca
- Quilca River
- Rímac River
- Pachitea River
- Perené River
- San Antonio River
- Santa River
- Sechín River
- Tambo River
- Tambopata River
- Tigre River
- Tumbes River
- Ucayali River
- Urubamba River
- Utcubamba River
- Virú River
- Yavarí River
- Zarumilla River

== See also ==
- Geography of Peru
