= Ferreñafe (disambiguation) =

Ferreñafe may refer to

- Ferreñafe, town in Peru
- Ferreñafe District, Peru
- Ferreñafe Province, Peru
