= Huarmey =

Town in the Ancash Region, Peru

Coordinates: 10°04′7″S 78°9′37″W

Huarmey is a coastal town in the Ancash Region, Peru. It is one of the five districts and also the capital of the Province of Huarmey. It is located crossing the Pan-American highway from south to north after leaving the department of Lima in Paramonga and at 82 km from the Fortaleza River. It was created by law 24034 on December 20, 1984.

At certain times of the year, the settlers fish abundant shrimps in the Huarmey River. This river fertilizes the valley and flows from south to north.

The port of Huarmey is located at 5 km to the south, through a detour that begins in the Pan-American highway.

Huarmey is 83 km from the next major city, Casma.

This city is largely undeveloped, though is one of the main cities of the Ancash Region. Huarmey has its own beaches and it has facilities for camping and surf. The water is very cold all year round, despite the high temperatures of the city.

Huarmey is on the site of the Punta Lobos massacre, a 14th-century pre-Columbian Chimú human sacrifice and mass burial site.

== Climate ==
Climate data for Huarmey, elevation 8 m (26 ft), (1991–2020)
Month	Jan	Feb	Mar	Apr	May	Jun	Jul	Aug	Sep	Oct	Nov	Dec	Year
Mean daily maximum °C (°F)	27.5 (81.5)	28.4 (83.1)	27.5 (81.5)	25.5 (77.9)	23.2 (73.8)	21.8 (71.2)	20.8 (69.4)	20.2 (68.4)	20.6 (69.1)	21.6 (70.9)	23.2 (73.8)	25.3 (77.5)	23.8 (74.8)
Mean daily minimum °C (°F)	18.8 (65.8)	19.6 (67.3)	19.2 (66.6)	17.5 (63.5)	16.1 (61.0)	15.2 (59.4)	14.9 (58.8)	14.5 (58.1)	14.8 (58.6)	14.8 (58.6)	15.5 (59.9)	17.2 (63.0)	16.5 (61.7)
Average precipitation mm (inches)	0.8 (0.03)	0.7 (0.03)	0.4 (0.02)	0.1 (0.00)	0.0 (0.0)	0.0 (0.0)	0.0 (0.0)	0.0 (0.0)	0.0 (0.0)	0.1 (0.00)	0.0 (0.0)	0.5 (0.02)	2.6 (0.1)
Source: National Meteorology and Hydrology Service of Peru
