= Pueblo Nuevo =

Pueblo Nuevo (Spanish, 'New Town') may refer to:

== Places ==
=== Chile ===
- Pueblo Nuevo, Temuco

=== Colombia ===
- Pueblo Nuevo, Córdoba

=== Cuba ===
- Pueblo Nuevo, Havana, ward in Centro Habana
- Pueblo Nuevo, Matanzas
- Pueblo Nuevo, Camajuaní II
- Pueblo Nuevo, Luis Arcos Bergnes, in Luis Arcos Bergnes, Cuba

=== Guatemala ===
- Pueblo Nuevo, Suchitepéquez

=== Mexico ===
- Pueblo Nuevo, Durango
  - Pueblo Nuevo Municipality, Durango
- Pueblo Nuevo, Guanajuato
- Pueblo Nuevo, Jalisco, near Barranca de Otates
- Pueblo Nuevo Solistahuacán, Chiapas

=== Nicaragua ===
- Pueblo Nuevo, Nicaragua

=== Panama ===
- Pueblo Nuevo, Panama
  - Pueblo Nuevo metro station

=== Peru ===
- Pueblo Nuevo District, Chincha
- Pueblo Nuevo District, Chepén
  - Pueblo Nuevo, Chepén
- Pueblo Nuevo District, Ferreñafe
- Pueblo Nuevo District, Ica

=== Spain ===
- Pueblo Nuevo, Madrid
  - Pueblo Nuevo (Madrid Metro), a metro station connecting lines 5 and 7
- Pueblo Nuevo, Valencia
- Pueblonuevo del Guadiana, or Pueblonuevo, Badajoz, Extremadura
- Peñarroya-Pueblonuevo, Córdoba

=== United States ===
- Pueblo Nuevo, Texas

=== Venezuela ===
- Pueblo Nuevo, Falcón, municipal seat of Falcón Municipality, Falcón
- Pueblo Nuevo, Zulia, municipal seat of Francisco Javier Pulgar Municipality, Zulia

== Music ==
- "Pueblo Nuevo" (danzón), composition by Israel López "Cachao"
- "Pueblo Nuevo se pasó", composition by Lilí Martínez

== See also ==
- Pueblo Viejo (disambiguation)
