= La Leche River =

River in the Lambayeque Region of Peru

La Leche River Mochica: Lamcarlech - Lalech
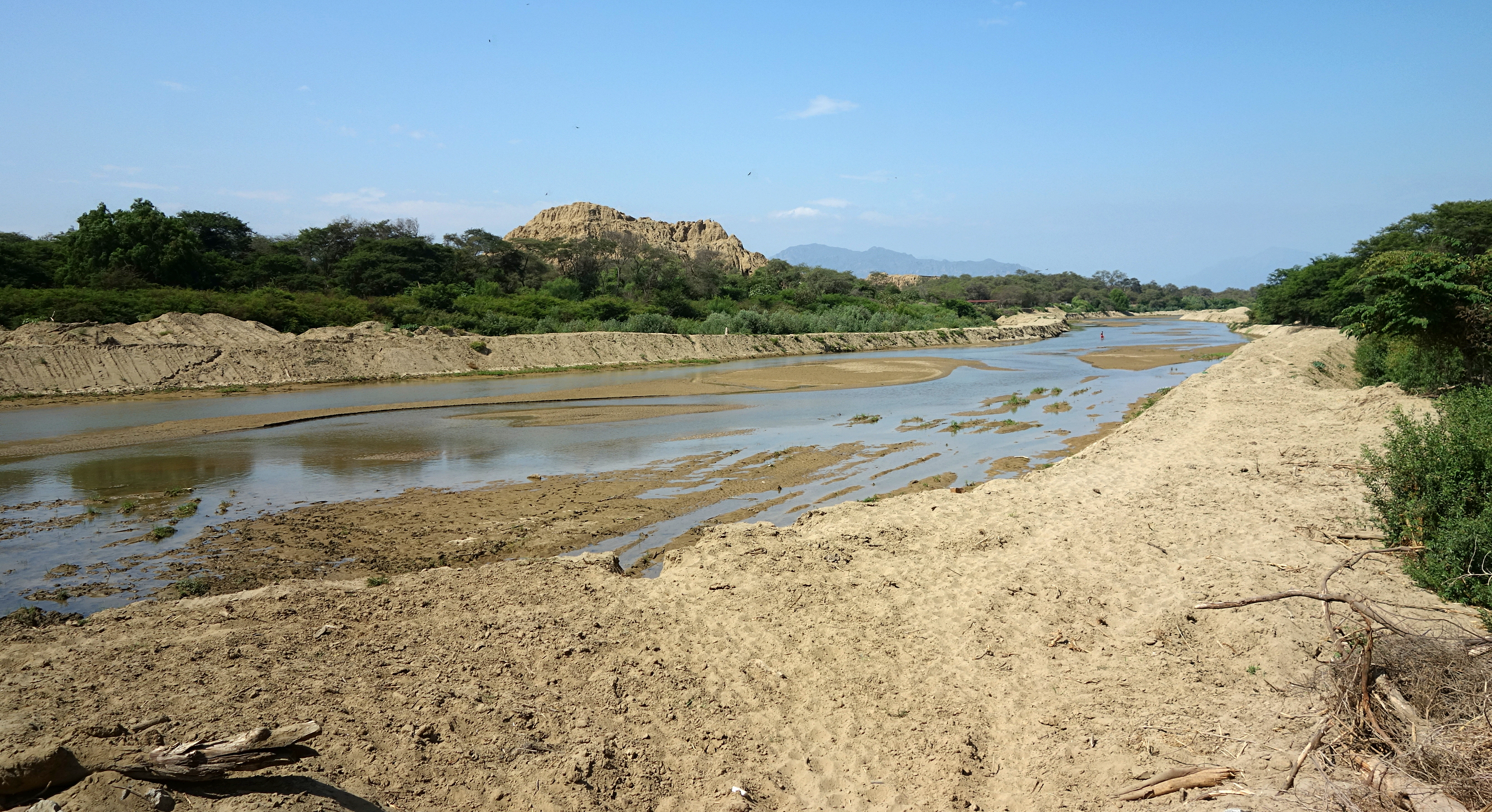
- La Leche river in Pómac Sanctuary

- Location of La Leche's source in Peru
- Native name: Spanish: Río La Leche

Location
- Country: Peru
- Region: Lambayeque

Physical characteristics
- Source: Mount Choicopico
  - coordinates: 06°13′19″S 079°4′59″W
  - elevation: 4,230 metres (13,878 ft)
- Mouth: Motupe River
  - location: West of Pacora
  - coordinates: 06°26′08″S 079°56′02″W
  - elevation: 41.09 metres (134.810 ft)
- Length: 64 km (40 mi)

Basin features
- Tributaries
  - right: Moyán River, Sangana River

La Leche River (Spanish: Río La Leche, Muchic: Lamcarlech or Lalech), meaning the milky one, is a river of Lambayeque Region in northwestern Peru, although some of its water come from the northern Cajamarca Region.

== Geography ==
La Leche arises off the northern slopes of Mount Choicopico, 06°13′19″S 079°4′59″W, at an altitude of 4,230 metres (13,878 ft) in Ferreñafe Province, of Lambayeque Region. Its two main tributaries are the Moyán and the Sangana rivers, both right-hand tributaries. Formerly the river ran parallel to the Motupe River as it entered the saline Sechura Desert; however, due to stream capture it now has the Motupe River flowing into its bed at 06°26′08″S 079°56′02″W, with the resultant river being called the Motupe. During the rainy season, mid November to mid April, but especially during El Niño events, La Leche can experience severe flooding, and in some years by the end of the dry season it can almost disappear. Traditionally stone levees were used to try to control the flooding, but in the 21st century upland dams are being used.

The valley of La Leche is variously forested, grassland and agricultural. The largest town along La Leche is Incahuasi. Both the Laquipampa Wildlife Refuge and the Pómac Forest Historical Sanctuary are along La Leche.
