= Atacuari River =

Location
- Country: Peru, Colombia

Physical characteristics
- Source
  - location: Loreto Department
- Mouth: Amazon River
  - coordinates: 3°49′40″S 70°36′24″W

Atacuari River is a left-bank tributary of the Amazon River, approximately 207 km in length. It is located in north-eastern Peru in Mariscal Ramón Castilla province, Loreto and its final 13 km forms part of the border with Colombia.

== See also ==
- List of rivers of Colombia
- List of rivers of Peru
