= Pueblo Viejo =

Pueblo Viejo (Spanish, 'Old Town') may refer to the following places:

- Pueblo Viejo, Salta, Argentina
- Pueblo Viejo, Belize, a municipality in Belize
- Pueblo Viejo, Magdalena, Colombia
- Pueblo Viejo, Dominican Republic
  - Pueblo Viejo National Park
- Pueblo Viejo Canton, Ecuador
- Pueblo Viejo Municipality, Veracruz, Mexico
- Pueblo Viejo, Guaynabo, Puerto Rico

== See also ==
- Pueblo Nuevo (disambiguation)
