= Punta Lobos massacre =

1350 AD massacre in Punta Lobos, Peru

The Punta Lobos massacre refers to the unexplained murders of approximately 200 people in Punta Lobos, Peru, in 1350 AD.

In 1997, members of an archaeological team performing a survey for a mining company discovered approximately 200 bodies on the beach at Punta Lobos, Peru. The bodies had their hands bound behind their backs, their feet were bound together, they were blindfolded, and their throats had been slashed.

Archeologists say the fishermen were knifed through the collarbone—straight into the heart—in a giant human sacrifice ceremony by members of the powerful Chimu people as a sign of gratitude to their revered sea god Ni after they conquered the fishermen's fertile seaside valley in 1350 AD. Their bodies, left unburied by the Chimu and later covered up by wind-driven sand, were, despite the passage of time, found in varying states of decay—some complete with muscle tissue, hair, and even fingernails.

The remains of the fishermen were discovered close to the modern-day town of Huarmey, Peru, about 275 kilometres north of Lima, Peru. The archaeologists were conducting an impact assessment for a port project connected to a copper and zinc mine.

== See also ==
- Chimú culture
