= Manuel Antonio Mesones Muro District =

Coordinates: 6.6445°S 79.7392°W

- District
- Interactive map of Manuel Antonio Mesones Muro District
- Country: Peru
- Region: Lambayeque
- Province: Ferreñafe
- Founded: February 17, 1951
- Capital: Manuel Antonio Mesones Muro

Government
  - Mayor: Jose Mercedes Ramirez Huamán (2019-2022)

Area
  - Total: 200.57 km^{2} (77.44 sq mi)
- Elevation: 62 m (203 ft)

Population (2017)
  - Total: 3,808
  - Density: 18.99/km^{2} (49.17/sq mi)
- Time zone: UTC-5 (PET)
- UBIGEO: 140204

Manuel Antonio Mesones Muro District is one of six districts of the province Ferreñafe in Peru.

== See also ==
- Manuel Antonio Mesones Muro
