= Laquipampa Wildlife Refuge =

Protected area in Lambayeque, Peru

- Refugio de Vida Silvestre Laquipampa; Laquipampa
- IUCN category IV (habitat/species management area)
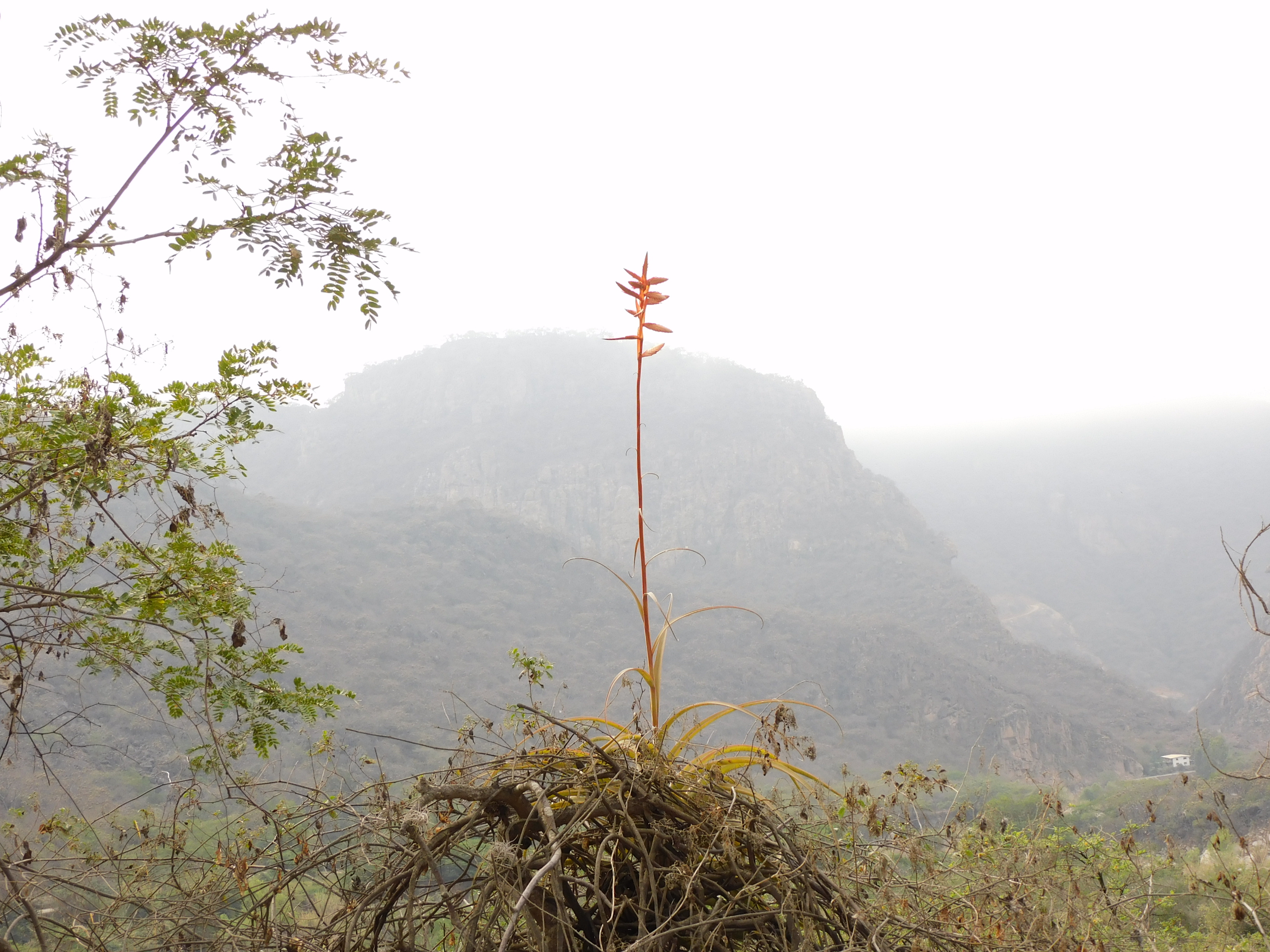

- Location within Peru
- Interactive map of Laquipampa Wildlife Refuge
- Location: Peru; Lambayeque Region; Ferreñafe Province; Incahuasi District
- Nearest city: Incahuasi
- Coordinates: 6°21′00″S 79°28′59″W
- Area: 113.47 km^{2} (43.81 sq mi)
- Established: 7 July 2006
- Visitors: 2000 (in 2023)
- Governing body: SERNANP
- Website: Refugio de Vida Silvestre Laquipampa

Laquipampa Wildlife Refuge is a protected area in the region of Lambayeque, Peru. It protects tropical dry forests, habitat of the white-winged guan and the spectacled bear.

== Ecology ==
=== Flora ===
Among the trees found in this protected area are: Tara spinosa, Loxopterygium huasango, Bursera graveolens, Eriotheca ruizii, etc.

=== Fauna ===
Some of the birds found in this area are: the white-winged guan, the Piura chat-tyrant, the bearded guan, the Andean condor, the blue seedeater, etc.

Some mammals found in this area are: the spectacled bear, the Southern tamandua, the white-tailed deer, the Guayaquil squirrel, etc.

== See also ==
- Spectacled Bear Conservation Society - Peru
