= Motupe River =

River in Peru

- Location of mouth

Location
- Country: Peru
- Region: Lambayeque Region

Physical characteristics
- Mouth: Pacific Ocean
  - coordinates: 06°31′27″S 080°07′16″W

Motupe River (Río Motupe) is a river of Lambayeque Region in northwestern Peru. The Motupe River Basin, which includes its major tributary the La Leche River, is bounded by the Chancay-Lambayeque River Basin to the south, by the Olmos River Basin to the north, by the river basins of the Chotano and Huancabamba to the east, and on the west by the Pacific Ocean. The river receives its name from the village of Motupe, nearby where the Motupe River is formed.

The waters of the Motupe arise in the Andes at an elevation of about 5000 meters and flow south and then southwest. where its two main tributaries are the Moyán and the Sangana rivers, both right-hand tributaries. It does not received its name until the confluence of the Chiniama River and the Chóchope River, at 06°08′35″S 079°41′27″W. Shortly thereafter it is joined by the Chotoque River from the right and the Salas River from the left. It flows basically south and then southwest. It is joined by the La Leche at 06°26′08″S 079°56′02″W. The river eventually disappears into the saline Sechura Desert before reaching the Pacific Ocean. It currently flows about five kilometers north of the village of Morrope. During the rainy season, mid November to mid April, but especially during El Niño events, the Motupe can experience severe flooding, and in some years by the end of the dry season can almost disappear. Traditionally stone levees were used to try to control the flooding, but in the 21st century upland dams are being used.

The valley of the Motupe is variously forested, grassland and agricultural. The largest town along the Motupe is Incahuasi. Both the Laquipampa Wildlife Refuge and the Pómac Forest Historical Sanctuary are in the Motupe River Basin.
