= Ocoña River =

River in Peru

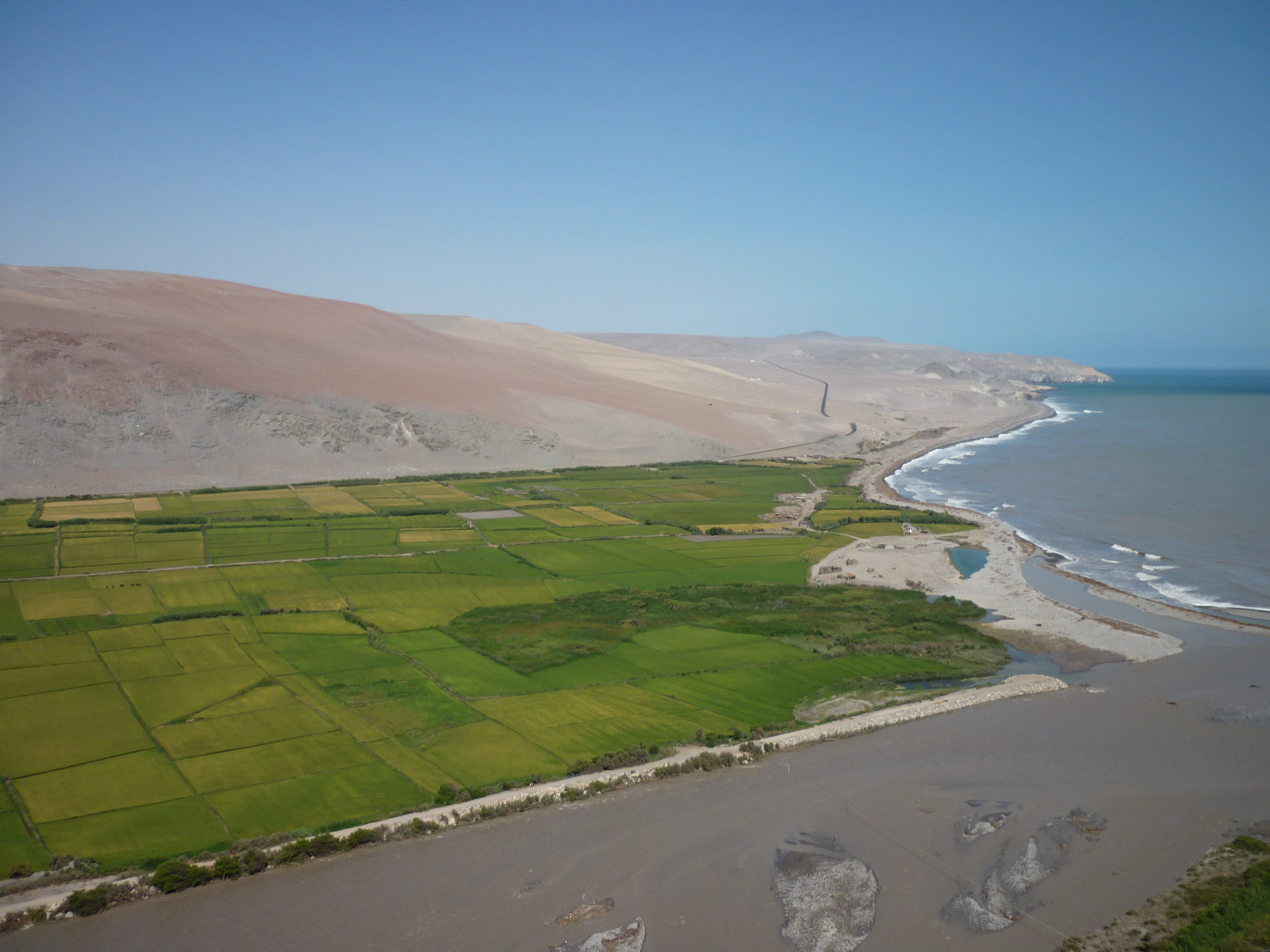
- Mouth of Ocoña River

- Location of mouth
- Native name: Rio Ocoña (Spanish)

Location
- Country: Peru

Physical characteristics
- Mouth
  - coordinates: 16.4519°S 73.1119°W

The Ocoña River (Spanish: Río Ocoña) is a river located in the Arequipa region in southern Peru. It helped form Peru's deep canyon walls.

== See also ==
- List of rivers of Peru
- List of rivers of the Americas by coastline
