= Pueblo Nuevo District, Ferreñafe =

Coordinates: 6.6404°S 79.7968°W

Pueblo Nuevo
- District
- Coat of arms
- Interactive map of Pueblo Nuevo
- Country: Peru
- Region: Lambayeque
- Province: Ferreñafe
- Capital: Pueblo Nuevo
- Subdivisions: 10

Government
  - Mayor: Diego Sernaque Paiva

Area
  - Total: 28.88 km^{2} (11.15 sq mi)
- Elevation: 57 m (187 ft)

Population (2005 census)
  - Total: 12,449
  - Density: 431.1/km^{2} (1,116/sq mi)
- Time zone: UTC-5 (PET)
- UBIGEO: 140206
- Website: munipueblonuevo.gob.pe

Pueblo Nuevo District is one of the six districts of the Ferreñafe Province in Peru.
