= Fortaleza River (Peru) =

River in Peru

- Location of the mouth
- Native name: Río de la Fortaleza (Spanish)

Location
- Country: Peru
- Region: Ancash
- Province: Barramca

Physical characteristics
- Source
  - location: Ancash
- Mouth: Pacific Ocean
  - location: Paramonga District
  - coordinates: 10°38′54″S 77°51′39″W
- Length: 100 km (62 mi)
- Basin size: 2,300 km^{2} (890 sq mi)

The Fortaleza River originates in the Department of Ancash, Peru, in the foothills of the Cordillera Negra. It has a route of just over 100 kilometres (62 mi) and a basin of 2,300 square kilometres (890 mi^{2}). It presents a highly irregular regime, so much so that in the months of June to October it does not reach the Pacific Ocean. Its waters are intensely used for the cultivation of sugarcane. It crosses the province of Barranca from east to west and reaches the Pacific Ocean through the agroindustrial valley of Paramonga. Its mouth is located just north of the town of Paramonga.

== See also ==
- List of rivers of Peru
- List of rivers of the Americas by coastline
