= Pozuzo River =

River in Peru

The Pozuzo River is a river in Peru. It has a general course south to north. This basin departmental limit Huánuco is understood between the Yanachaka mountain range to the east and the line - Pasco, for the north-east the line provincial limit Oxapampa - Cerro de Pasco for the south-west.

More information Pozuzo Information

- Length: 20 km
- Area: 6095 km^{2}
- I modulate: 442.8 m³/s
