= Huarmey River =

River in Peru

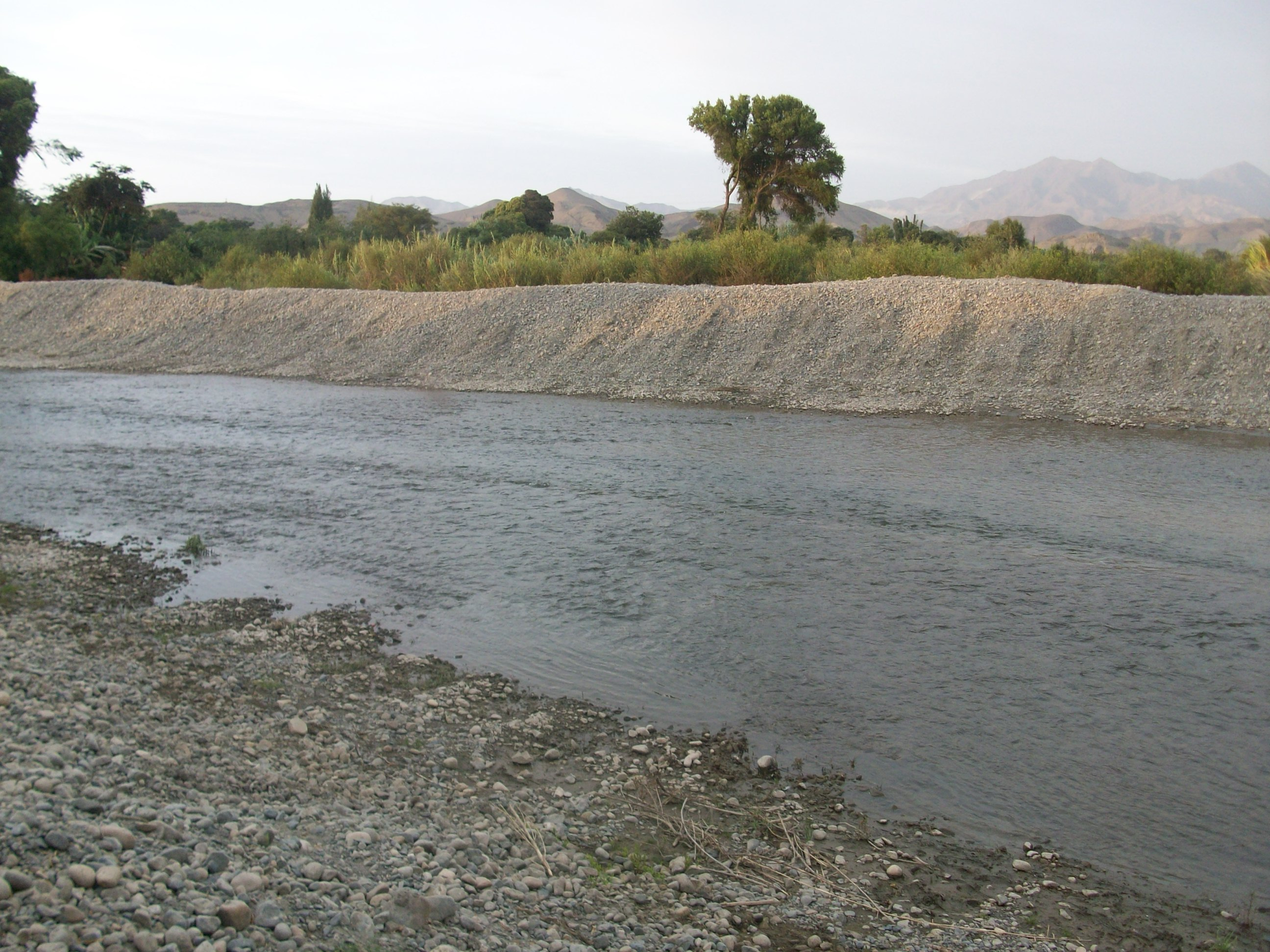

- Location of mouth
- Native name: Río Huarmey (Spanish)

Location
- Country: Peru
- Region: Ancash Region

Physical characteristics
- Mouth: Pacific Ocean
  - coordinates: 10°05′40″S 78°10′00″W

The Huarmey River in Peru is a seasonal river, with flows in the months of December to March; along with the underground water it is a vital source for the agricultural activities, industrial and domestic in the region.

The delta is an important agricultural area while the irrigation water in this arid zone is derived from the Huarmey river. Without irrigation by river water agriculture would not be possible. However, the natural underground drainage of the area is limited, and for this reason the lower parts of the delta have become waterlogged and salinized.

To overcome this problem, the installation of wells to abstract groundwater for supplemental irrigation and lowering of the water table, and drainage by ditches and wells to evacuate the salty percolation water, is being implemented.

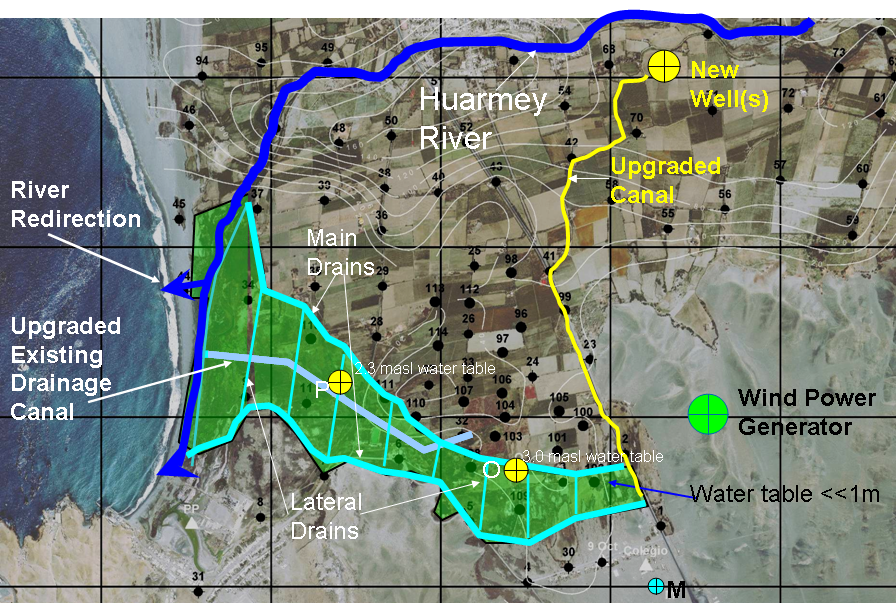
Huarmey delta, Peru. A drainage system is contemplated to combat waterlogging and salinity.

== See also ==
- List of rivers of Peru
- List of rivers of the Americas by coastline
