= Mantaro River =

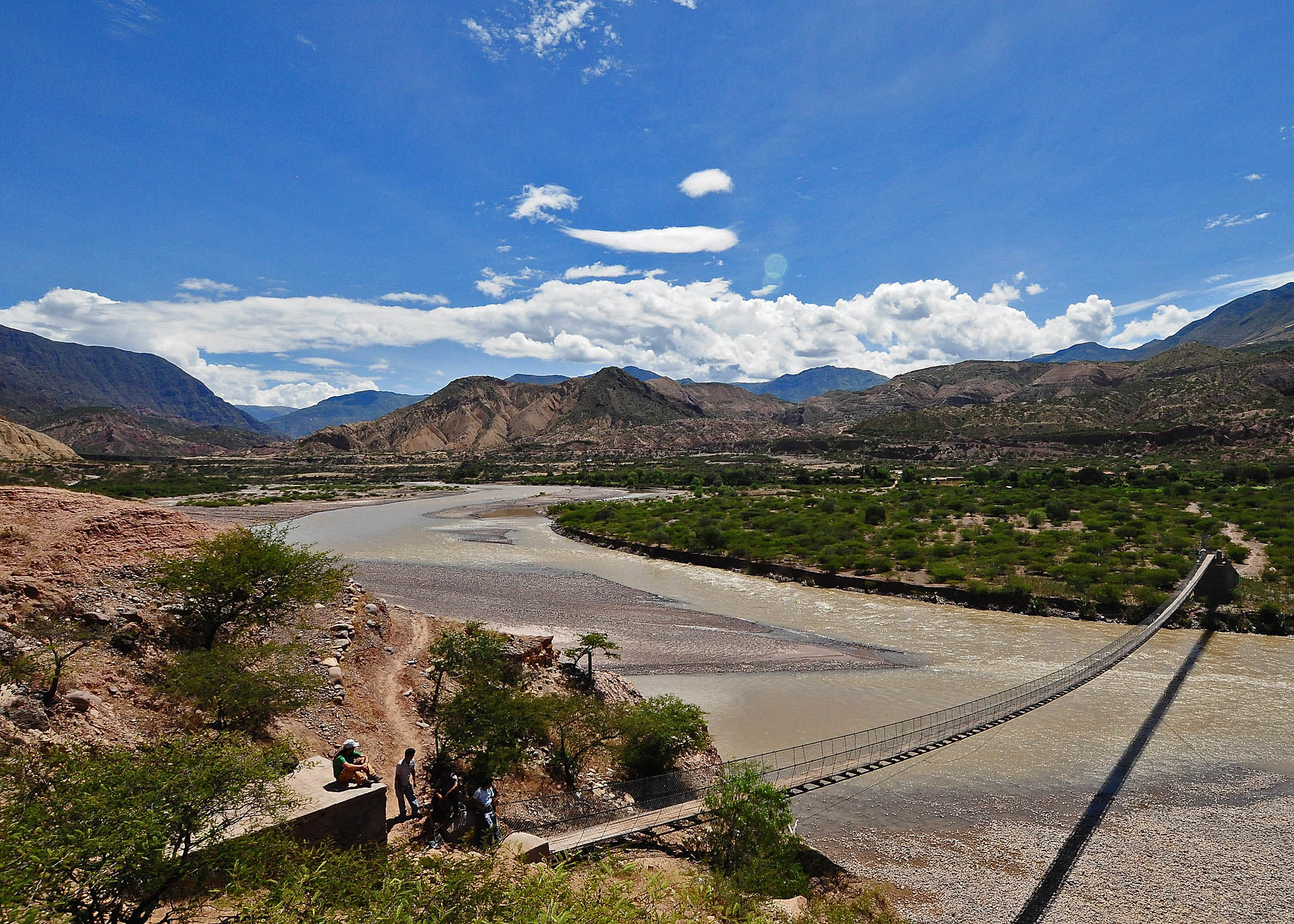

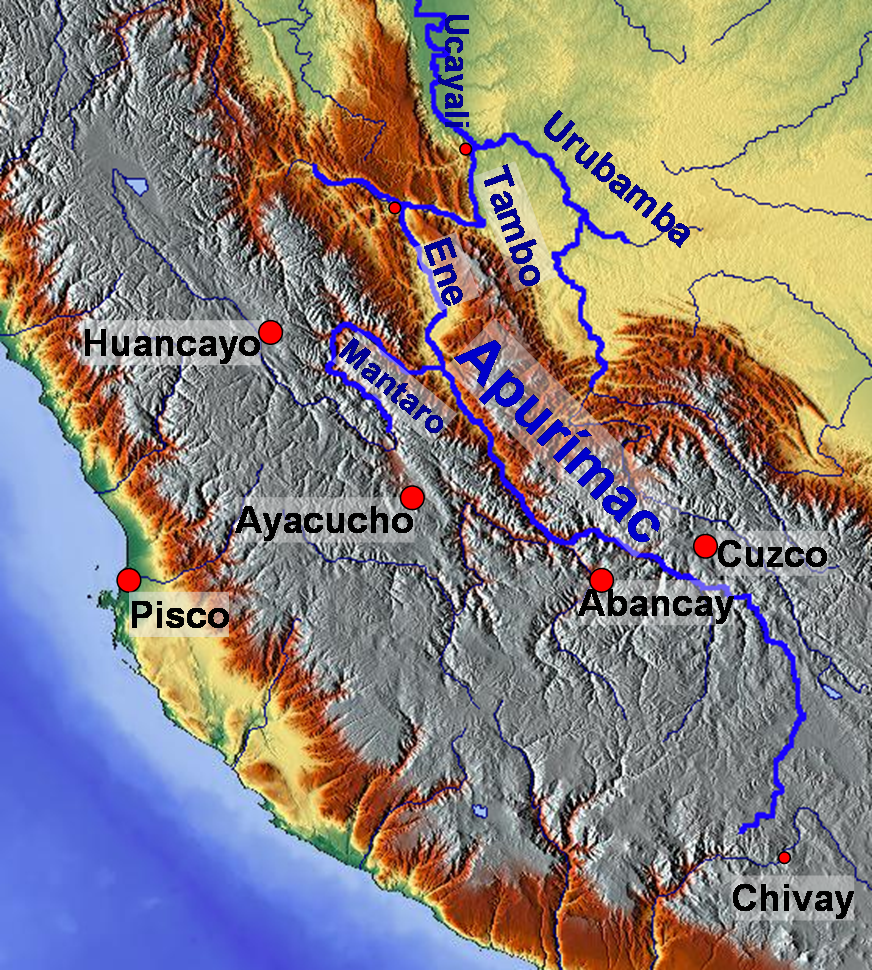
- Map of large rivers in south-central Peru (only the lower section of Mantaro River is highlighted)

Location
- Country: Peru

Physical characteristics
- Source: Lake Junin
- Mouth: Ene River
  - coordinates: 12°15′46″S 73°58′44″W
- Length: 739 km (459 mi)
- Basin size: 15,410 km^{2} (5,950 sq mi)

Basin features
- Tributaries
  - right: Cunas River, Ichhu River, Kachimayu

The Mantaro River (Spanish: Río Mantaro, Quechua: Hatunmayu) is a long river running through the central region of Peru. Its Quechua name means "great river". The word "Mantaro" may be a word originally from the Asháninka language, who live downstream along the Ene River. The Mantaro, along with the Apurímac River, are the sources of the Amazon River, depending on the criteria used for definition.

== Geography ==
The river nominally has its source at Lake Junin, but tributaries above Lake Junin extend as much as 70 km farther upstream, for a total length of 809 km. The named tributaries of the river are the Cunas, which enters the Mantaro at regional capital Huancayo, and the Kachimayu, which joins in near the city of Ayacucho. The upper Mantaro is 432 km long, extending from Lake Junin to the Kachimayu inflow while the lower river shown on the map is 307 km long. The river runs through the provinces of Junín, Yauli, Jauja, Concepción and Huancayo in the Junín Region, then through the Huancavelica Region and the Ayacucho Region. The river then returns to the Junín Region in Satipo Province, where it unites with the Apurimac River to form the Ene River. Its hydrographic basin also includes some of the Pasco Region. The river belongs to the hydrographic basin of the Amazon River. Its principal tributaries are the Cunas River, the Vilca/Moya River, the Ichhu River, and the Kachimayu.

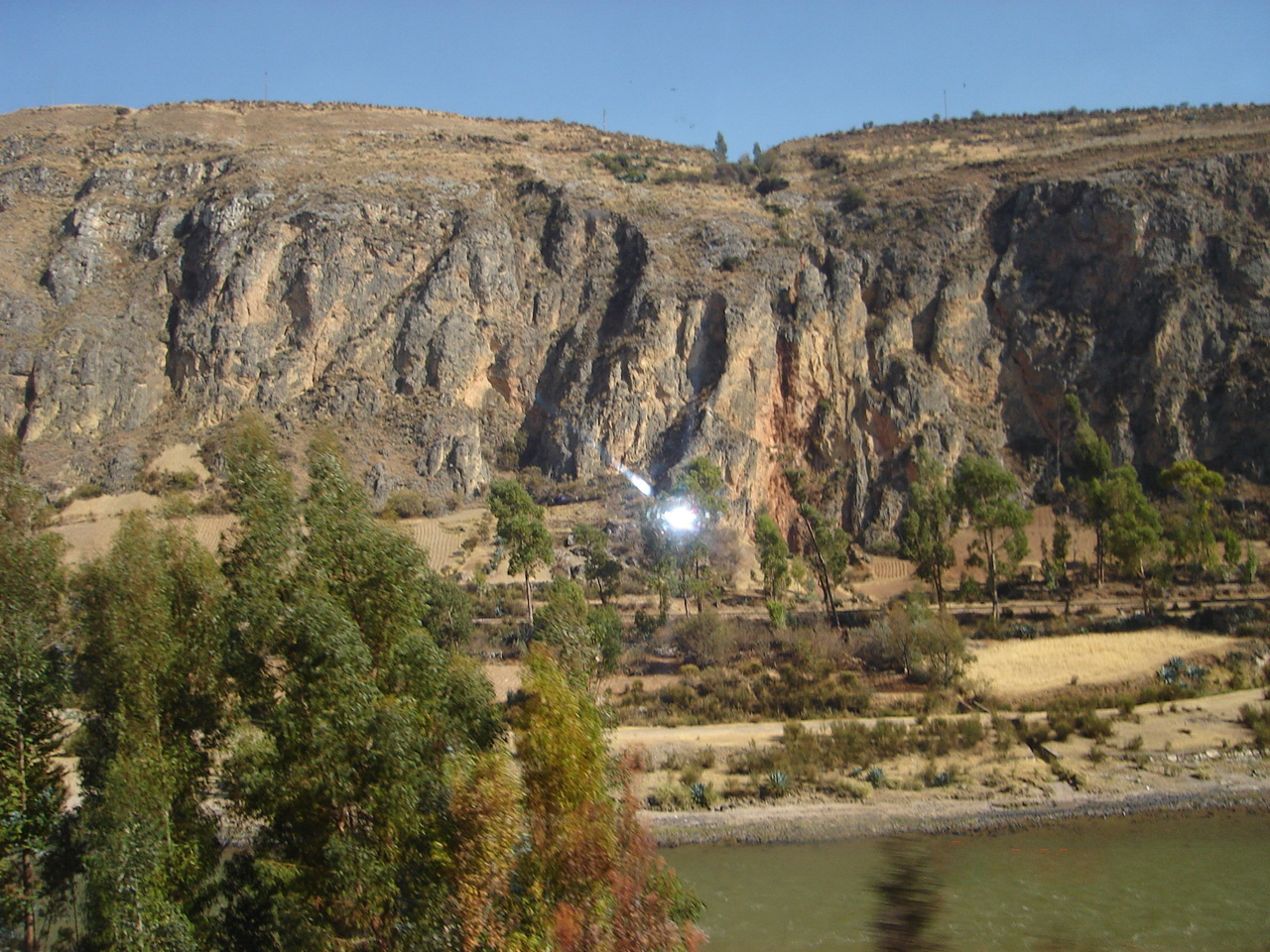
The Mantaro River in Junín region.

The river runs generally southeast through south-central Peru. Its source, Lake Junin is 4,082.7 m in elevation, while its mouth lies at a mere 440m above sea level. This gives the river an incredibly steep gradient of nearly 5m/km, sufficient to carve the impressive Mantaro Valley. This valley is the most important food source for the capital Lima.

The Mantaro Hydroelectric Complex is located in the Tayacaja Province of the Huancavelica Region, and produces 31% of all electrical energy generated in Peru.

The first complete paddling descent of the river from the source was accomplished by Rocky Contos and James Duesenberry in May 2012. Previously, the lower 140 km of the river were descended in kayak and later cataraft by Richard Pethigal in 2002. The lower section of the river is known for Sendero Luminoso camps.

== Source of the Amazon ==
In 1971, an expedition led by the National Geographic Society cited the Apurímac River as the designated headwaters of the Amazon River, with a follow-up expedition in 2000 confirming the connected Lake Ticllacocha as the furthest upstream Amazon extension. The definition for the distinction used at the time of survey was based on absolute length which the tributary added to the river, given a continuous and year-round flow of water. With the Tablachaca Dam built in 1974, a portion of the Mantaro River suffers a dry spell for five months of the year, previously excluding it from the list of source eligibility. However, research published in 2014 challenged this existing definition, and used advanced imaging and topographic data to establish the Mantaro as the true longest upstream source feeding into the Amazon Basin. The new measurements add approximately 75–92 km to the original Amazon River length.

== See also ==
- Kuntur Sinqa
