= Ferreñafe District =

Ferreñafe
- District
- Interactive map of Ferreñafe
- Country: Peru
- Region: Lambayeque
- Province: Ferreñafe
- Capital: Ferreñafe

Government
  - Mayor: Violeta Patricia Muro Mesones

Area
  - Total: 62.18 km^{2} (24.01 sq mi)
- Elevation: 67 m (220 ft)

Population (2017)
  - Total: 34,229
  - Density: 550.5/km^{2} (1,426/sq mi)
- Time zone: UTC-5 (PET)
- UBIGEO: 140201

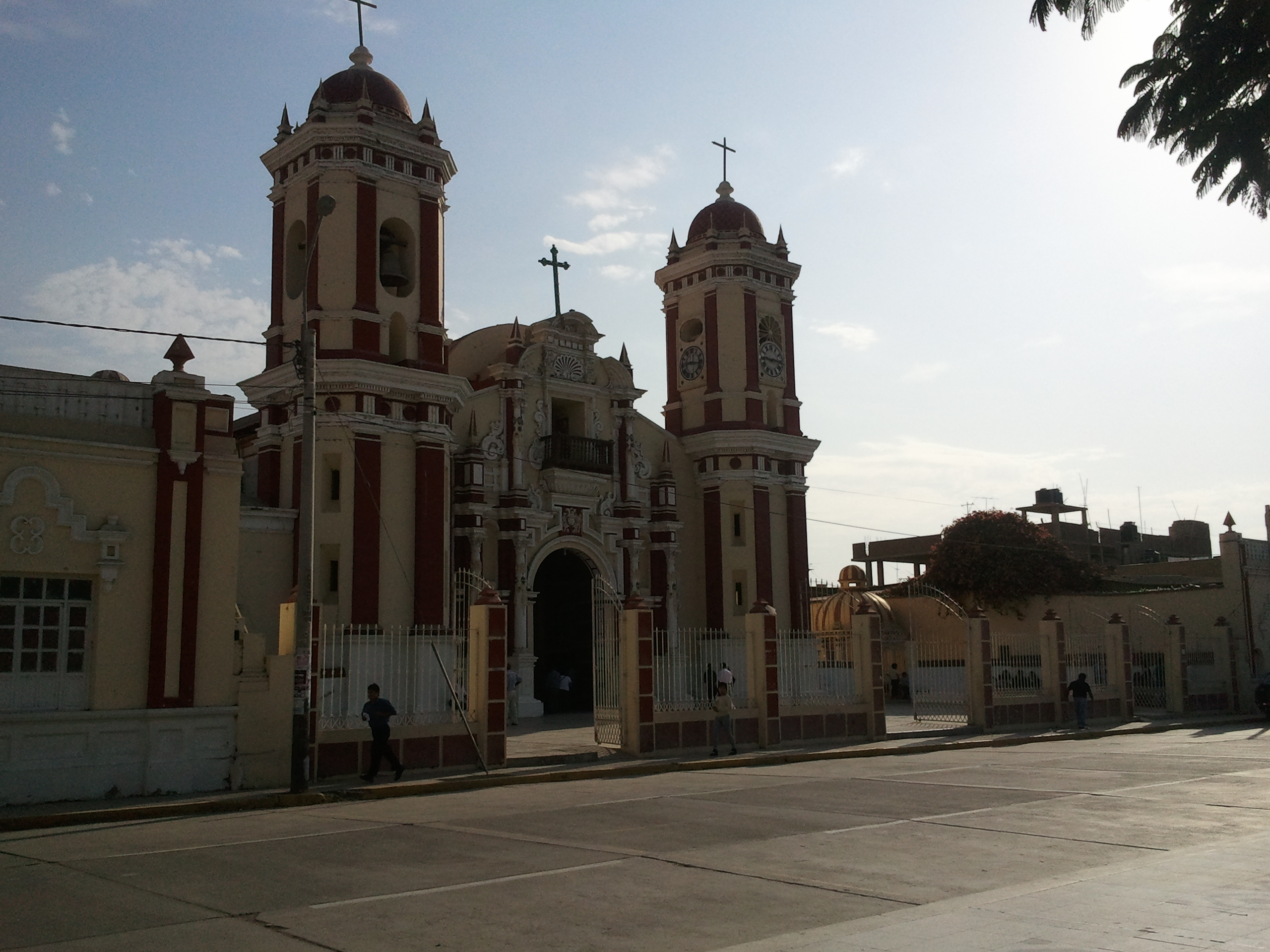
St Lucia’s church, Ferreñafe

Ferreñafe District is one of six districts of the province Ferreñafe in Peru.
