= Paramonga =

Ancient city in Peru

- Former city
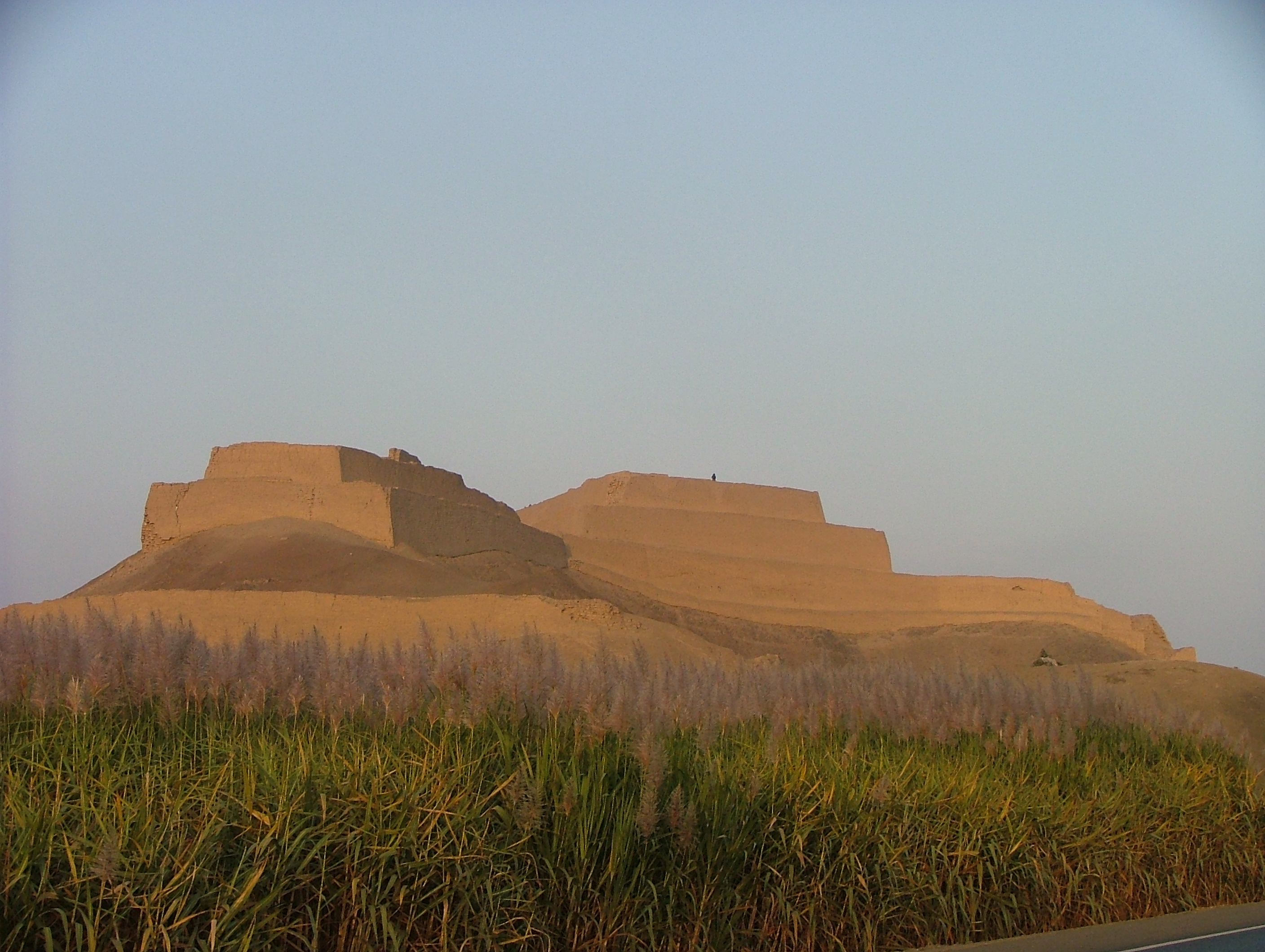
- View of the Paramonga Fortress

- Location within Peru
- Coordinates: 10.65°S 77.84°W
- Built: c. 1200–1400
- Ruined: by 1541

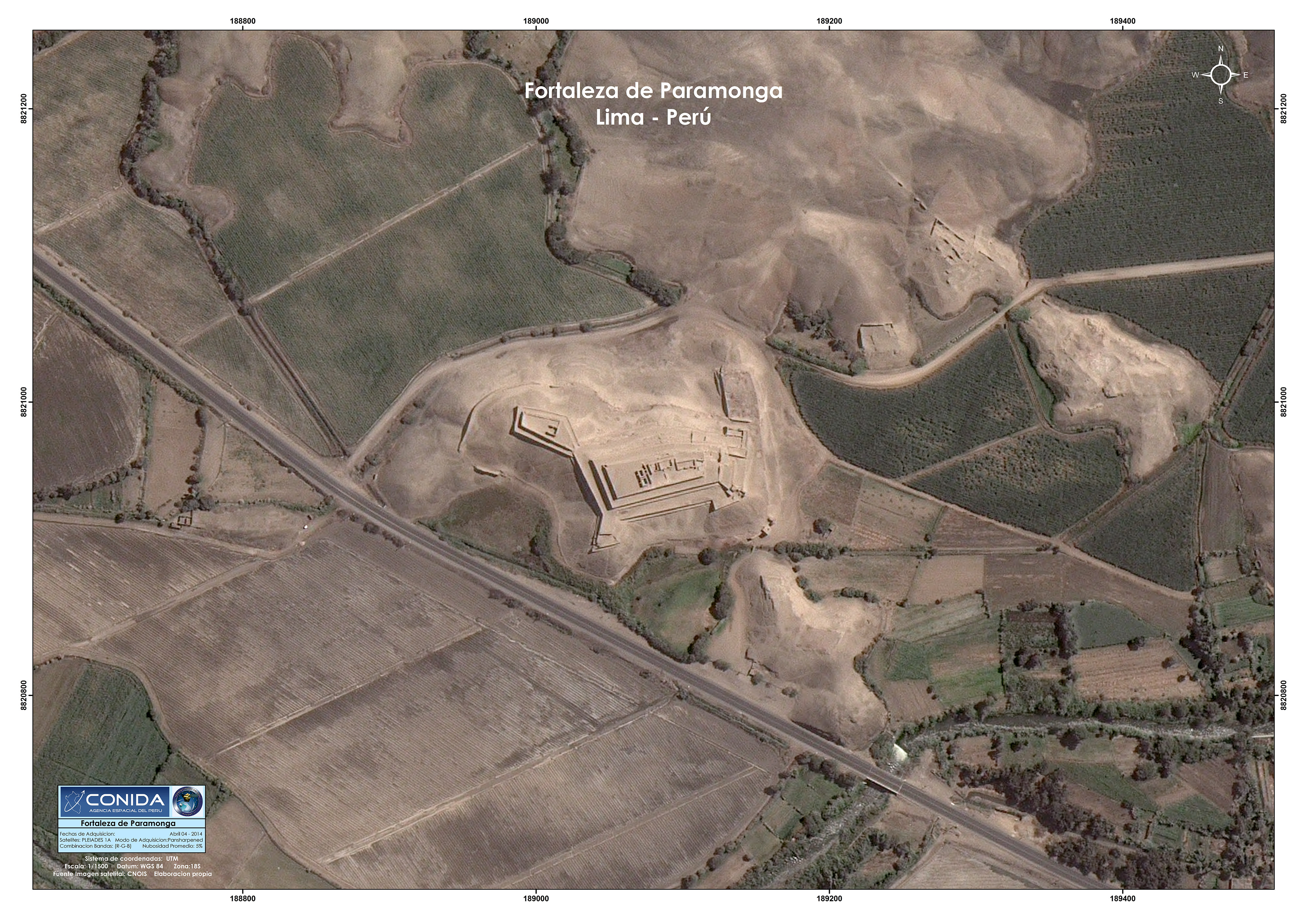
Aerial photo of the fortress taken by the PeruSat-1 satellite.

Paramonga was an important city constructed at the border of the former Kingdom of Chimor in Peru during the late Intermediate Period (AD 1200 to 1400), whose capital was the metropolis of Chan Chan.

Paramonga is located on the Fortaleza River, close to the town of Pativilca to the north of Lima. It is said that it was an important religious settlement, similar to Pachacamac. It is named after the nearby modern town of Paramonga, as its original name is unknown. Paramonga is often called a fortress due to its staggered pyramid of four levels of enormous proportions constructed on a hill, which somewhat resembles a European medieval castle, though it was built prior to Spanish colonization of the area.

== History ==
The oldest written records of Paramonga belong to Miguel de Estete, who was called the "chronicler soldier", during the conquest of the Tawantinsuyu. In 1533, Estete accompanying Hernando Pizarro and his little dispatch of 'twenty horsemen and some arquebusiers' with a few of Atahualpa's retainers acting as guides descended from Cajamarca, by orders of the leader of the conquistador band in Peru, the brother of Hernando, Francisco Pizarro, who had settled in Cajamarca alongside a captive Atahualpa Inca since the previous year in order to wait for the completion of enormous ransom payment of gold and silver proposed by Atahualpa for his own rescue, however as time passed the supply of precious metal artifacts arriving at Cajamarca had significantly decreased over the past months, the Spaniards were growing impatient and the tensions between the newly arrived Almagrists and the Pizarrists were beginning to escalate, in an attempt to complete the payment of his ransom Atahaulpa then proposes to the Spanish to loot Pachacamac, city where riches abounded but held by priests that sided with Huascar in the Inca civil war and thus were enemies of Atahualpa. Estete and Hernando's expedition traveled by the Able Ñan (dirt road) along the coast, and became the first Spaniards to have visited Paramonga along the way to Pachacamac. During the Spanish colonial period, Paramanonga would be visited by a number of chroniclers, soldiers, priests, and other literate men. Estete wrote in his account.

"... and another day we went to sleep in a large town that is called Parmunga, which is next to the sea, has a Strong House, with five blind fences, painted of elaborately on the inside and outside with its walls carved, the way it is done in Spain, with two tigers (pumas?) at the main entrance ..."

Another chronicler, Pedro Cieza de León, passed Paramonga during his trip from the City of the Kings (Lima) to Trujillo in 1541. He described it by the following:

"There is one thing worth seeing in this valley, which is a fine well-built fortress, and it is certainly very curious to see how they raised water in channels to irrigate higher levels. The buildings were very handsome, and many wild beasts and birds were painted on the walls, which are now all in ruins and undermined in many places by those who have searched for buried gold and silver. In these days the fortress only serves as a witness to that which has been."

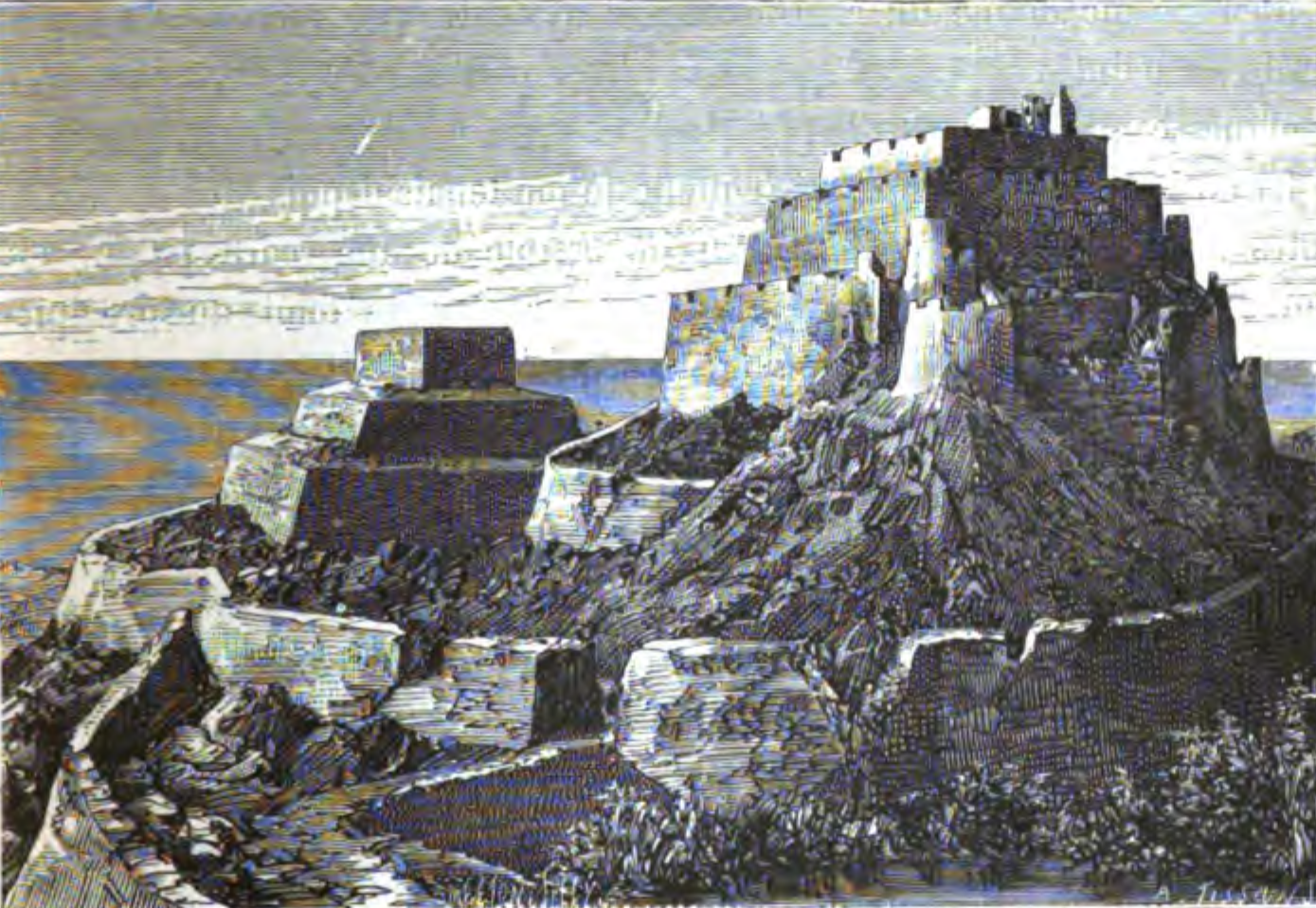
Illustration of the Paramonga Fortress in Charles Wiener's book of 1880 Pérou et Bolivie. Récit de voyage.

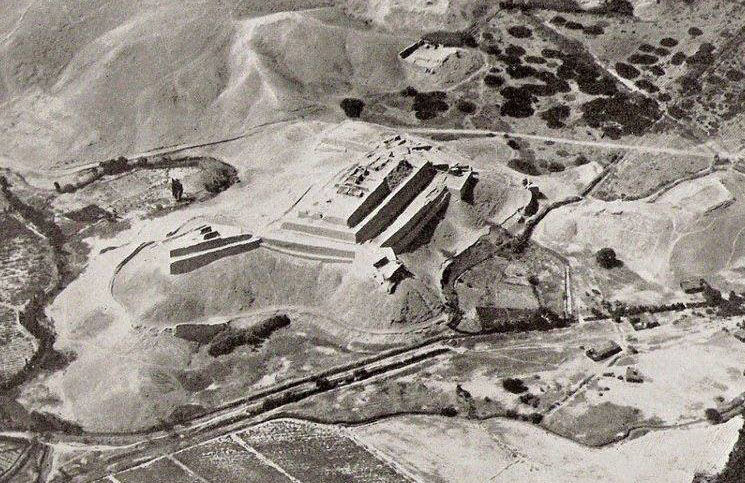
Paramonga aerial photo looking northeast, by George R. Johnson, taken between 1928 and 1930.
