= Cunas River =

Coordinates: 12.064707°S 75.238752°W

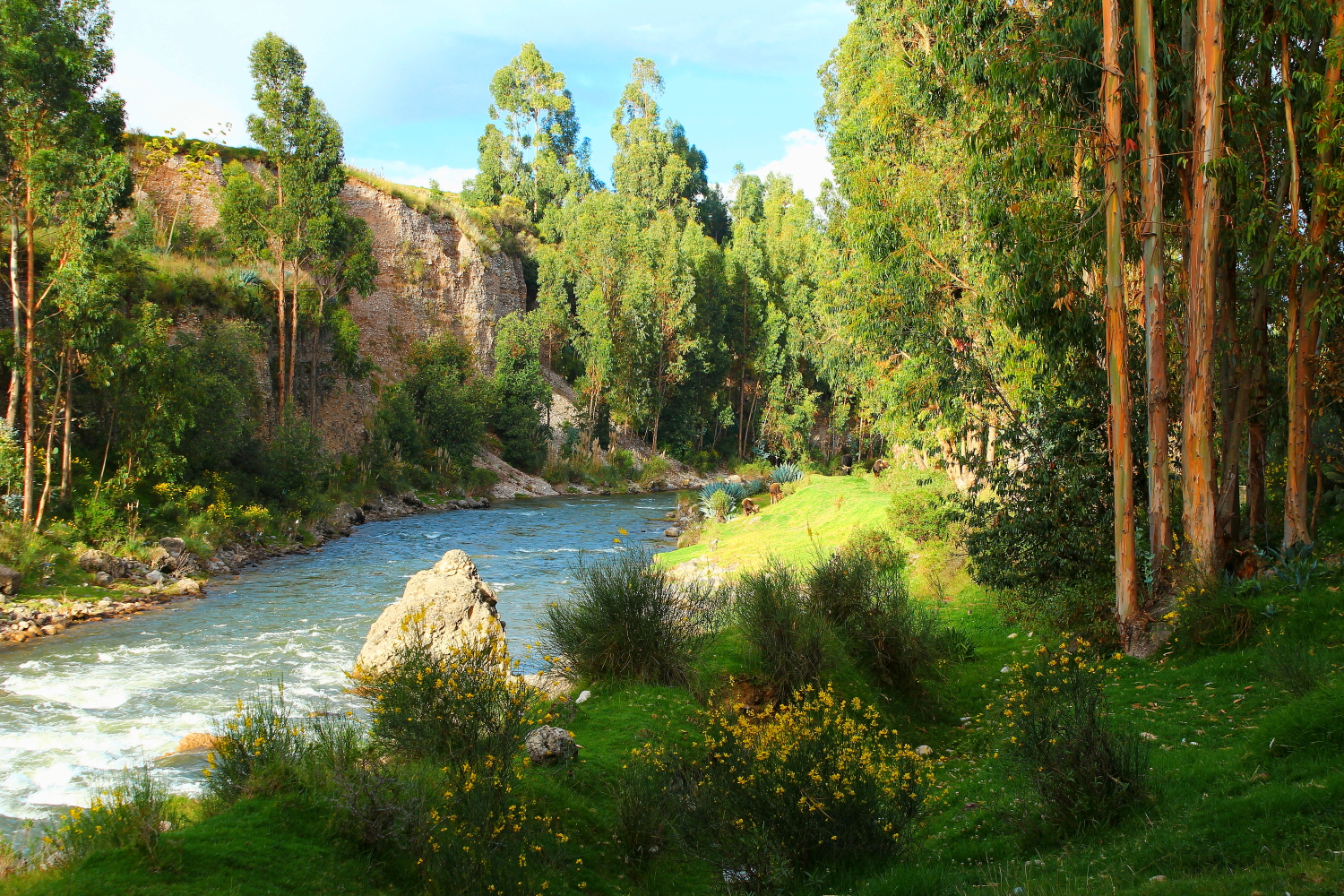
- Cunas River in Chupaca Province

Location
- Country: Peru

Physical characteristics
- Source
  - location: Cordillera Occidental
  - elevation: 5,180 m (16,990 ft)
- Length: 91 km (57 mi)

The Cunas River is a river located in the Junín region in central Peru. It originates 5,180 meters above sea level in the Cordillera Occidental. The river spans 3 provinces in the Junín region: Chupaca Province, Concepción Province and the Huancayo Province.

== Course ==
The river travels southwest to northeast and enters the Mantaro Valley. The Cunas belongs to the basin of the Mantaro River and is one of the main tributaries of the Mantaro.

== Economy ==
The river passes through the Mantaro Valley which is one of the main suppliers of the city of Lima. The city of Chupaca is the main city along its route.
