= Pueblo Nuevo, Temuco =

Pueblo Nuevo
- Quarter
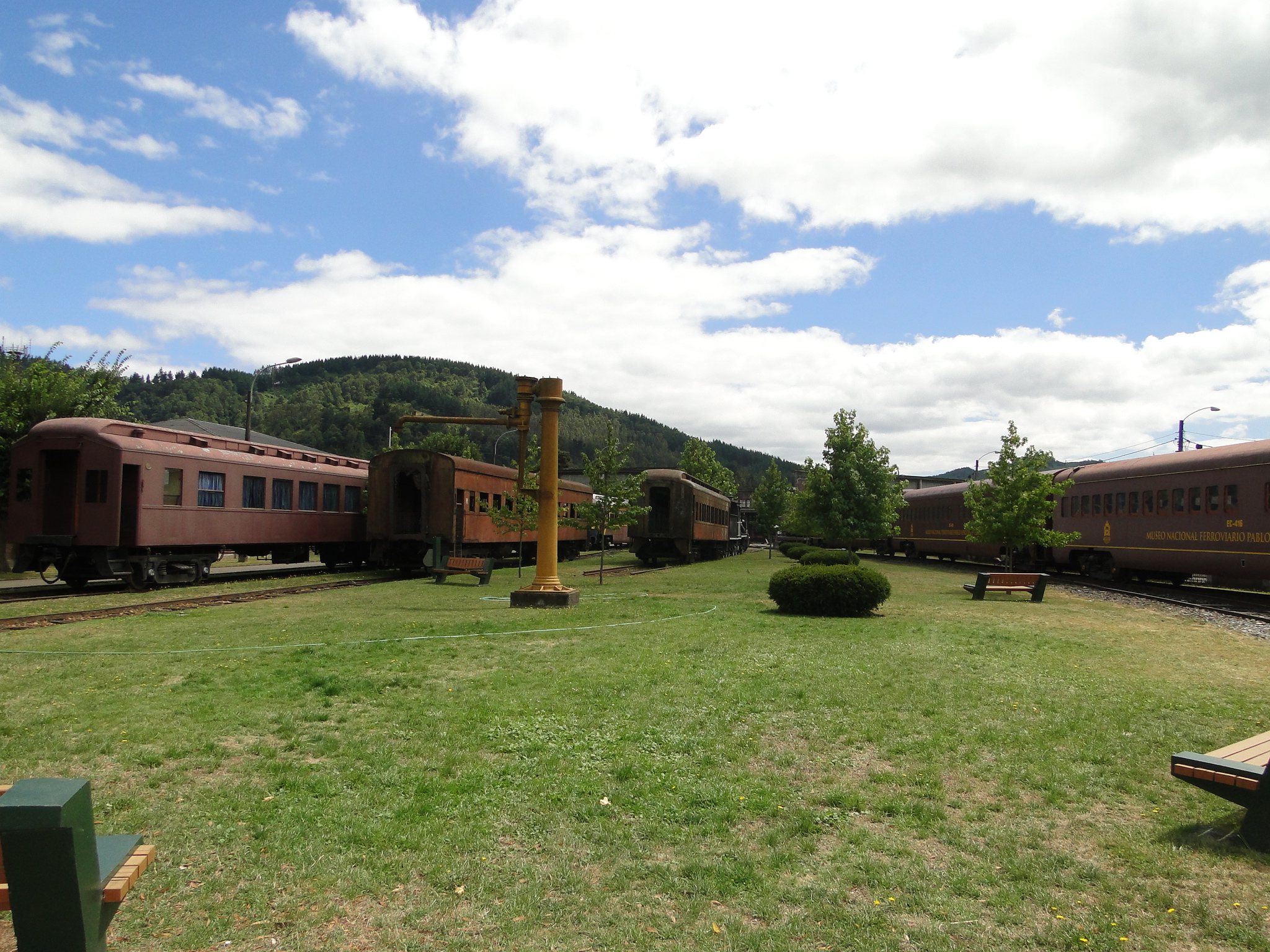
- Pablo Neruda National Railway Museum, located in Pueblo Nuevo Quarter.

- Location within Chile
- Coordinates: 38°43′45″S 72°34′42″W
- Country: Chile
- Region: Araucanía
- Province: Cautín
- Commune: Temuco

Area
  - Total: 11.44 km^{2} (4.42 sq mi)

Population (2010)
  - Total: 23,662
  - Density: 2,068/km^{2} (5,357/sq mi)

Pueblo Nuevo is a quarter of the City of Temuco, Chile. It is located in the northeast of the city, and corresponds to a residential area, with fragments used as warehouses, workshops, and electrical and transportation infrastructure. Its population was established there in the 1950s, but only in 2000 it was officially defined by the Municipality of Temuco in its Plan de desarrollo comunal (Communal Development Plan). Then, in 2010, in its Diagnóstico sistémico territorial (Territorial Systemic Diagnosis), the Municipality of Temuco modified its limits, transferring part of the territory of the Downtown and Costanera del Cautín Macrosectors, in addition to Ñielol Hill southeastern slopes. A new Territorial Diagnosis returned, in 2014, its original borders, being its current bordering macrosectors Ñielol (west), Costanera del Cautín (east and southeast) and Downtown, (south and southeast).

== Geography ==
It is located in the northeastern area of the City of Temuco.

Between 2010 and 2014, it had an area of 13.59 square kilometres (5.25 sq mi), having part of what was previously territory of Downtown and Costanera del Cautín Quarters, with which it bordered, in addition to Ñielol Hill southeastern slopes.

In 2014, when its limits were restored, it was left again with its initial 11.44 km^{2} (4.42 sq mi).

=== Limits ===
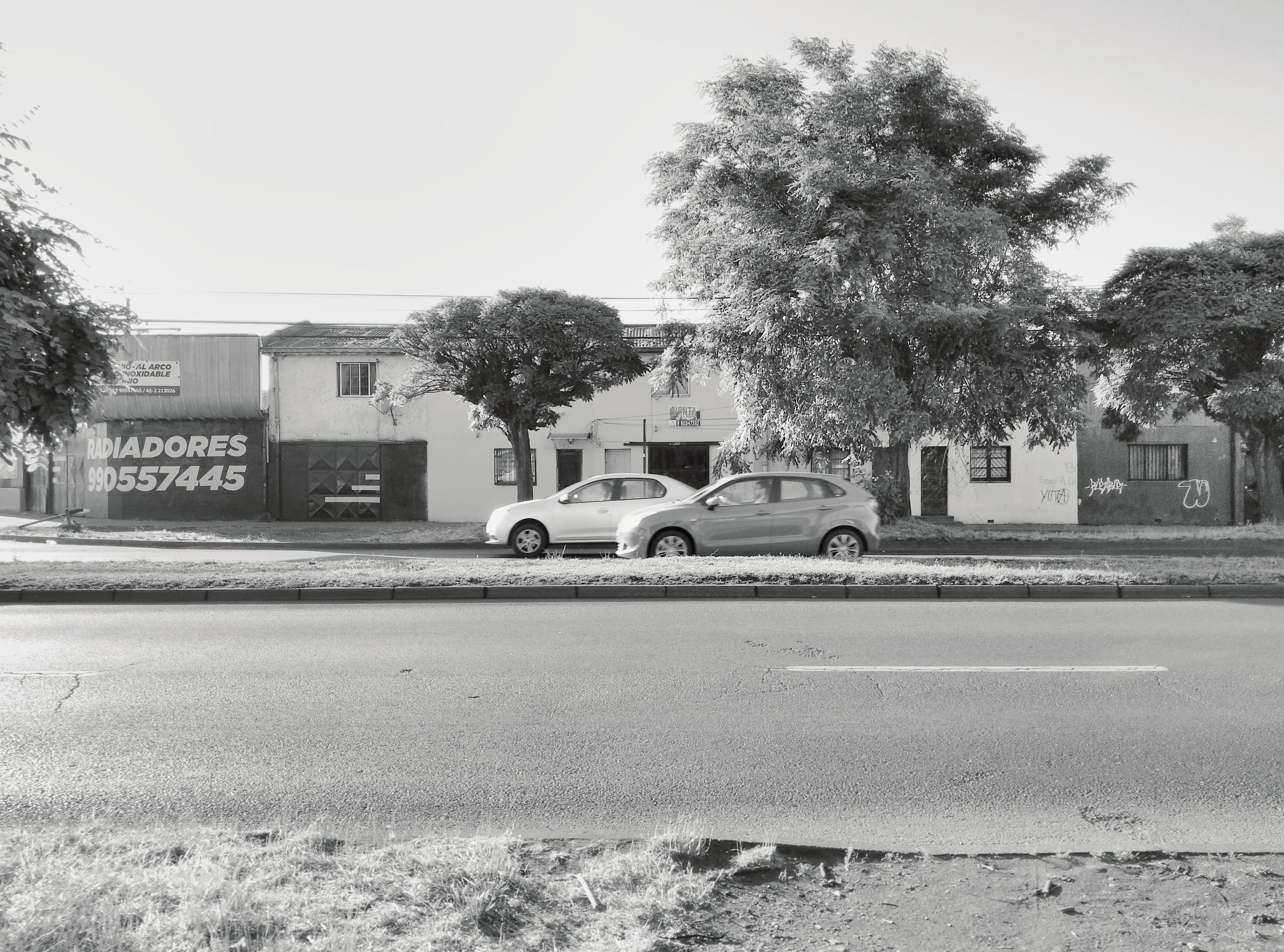
Caupolicán Avenue, where it is border of Pueblo Nuevo and Downtown quarters.

Currently, it is delimited by the urban limit of Temuco between the Cautín River and Rudecindo Ortega Avenue, and the imaginary straight line that joins the intersection of the northern access with that urban limit and point 23 of the border of the city (north); the imaginary straight line that joins point 23 with the crossing of Ñielol Alleyway and the public road projected as Orbital Street in the communal regulatory plan, Ñielol Alleyway, Callejuela and Vicente Pérez Rosales Streets, Gibbs Canal, and General Cruz Street (west); Tucapel Street (south); and Barros Arana Avenue and its extension from Holland Park to the urban limit of Temuco (east).

=== Bordering quarters ===
Pueblo Nuevo borders the following quarters: Costanera del Cautín, Downtown, and Ñielol

== Demography ==
Historical population of Pueblo Nuevo
| Year | 2002 | 2010 |
| Pop. | 26,043 | 23,662 |
| ±% | — | −9.1% |

== Town planning ==
=== Neighborhoods ===
The neighborhoods of Pueblo Nuevo are:
- Alborada
- Aurora
- Casa de Máquinas
- Cooperativa Ferroviaria
- Don Rosauro II
- El Esfuerzo
- Endesa
- Estación (shared with Downtown Quarter)
- Evaristo Marín
- Ferroparque
- Ferroviario
- Gabriela Mistral
- Juanita Aguirre
- La Portada
- Las Mariposas
- Litvanyi
- Lomas de Temuco
- Los Cántaros
- Los Copihues
- Los Nogales
- Los Trapiales
- Maestranza
- Magisterio
- Manuel Rodríguez
- Nahuelbuta
- Parque Alcántara
- Parque Alihuén
- Parque Don Rosauro
- Parque Oriente
- Perwitz
- Plaza Club
- Porvenir
- Santa Carolina
- Unión Porvenir
- Valle de Asturias
- Villa Central
- Vista Golf
- Vista Ñielol
- Vista Volcán

=== Green areas ===
- Bandejón Pinto
- Country Club

== Transportation ==
=== Road arteries ===
The road arteries of Pueblo Nuevo are:

- 1 Alleyway
- 1 Conjunto
- 1 Norte Avenue
- 1 Oriente Alleyway
- 10 Norte Street
- 10 Oriente Alleyway
- 11 Norte Street
- 11 Oriente Alleyway
- 12 de Febrero Street
- 12 Norte Street
- 2 Alleyway
- 2 Norte Street
- 2 Oriente Alleyway
- 21 de Mayo Street
- 3 Street
- 3 Street (Manuel Rodríguez Neighborhood)
- 3 Norte Street
- 3 Oriente Alleyway
- 4 Alleyway
- 4 Norte Street
- 4 Oriente Street
- 5 Street
- 5 de Abril Street
- 5 Norte Street
- 5 Oriente Alleyway
- 6 Norte Street
- 6 Oriente Alleyway
- 7 Norte Street
- 7 Oriente Alleyway
- 8 Norte Alleyway
- 8 Norte Street
- 8 Oriente Alleyway
- 9 Norte Alleyway
- 9 Norte Street
- Albert Camus Street
- Alejandro Gorostiaga Street
- Anatole France Alleyway
- Anken Tapel Street
- Antonio Machado Street
- Aracena Alleyway
- Arquitecto Alamiro Ojeda Alleyway
- Avilés Alleyway
- Bandera Alleyway
- Barros Arana Avenue
- Bartolo Coloma Street
- Bascuñán Santa María Street
- Basilio Urrutia Street
- Benito Pérez Galdos Alleyway
- Bernard Shaw Alleyway
- Brasil Street
- Braulio Sandoval Street
- Cacique Catrileo Alleyway
- Cacique Cayupi Street
- Cacique Cheuquellán Street
- Cacique Chiguayhuén Alleyway
- Cacique Colimán Street
- Cacique Colipán Alleyway
- Cacique Coliqueo Alleyway
- Cacique Huentu Alleyway
- Cacique Huillimán Alleyway
- Cacique Hueterucán Alleyway
- Cacique Lemunao Street
- Cacique Licanqueo Alleyway
- Cacique Lienán Alleyway
- Cacique Llanquihuén Alleyway
- Cacique Melillán Alleyway
- Cacique Melivilu Alleyway
- Cacique Nahuelhual Street
- Cacique Paillalef Alleyway
- Cajón-Pumalal Road
- Calderón de la Barca Street
- Callejuela
- Camilo José Cela Street
- Camino Las Mariposas Street
- Canto General Alleyway
- Castrillón Alleyway
- Caupolicán Alleyway
- Caupolicán Avenue
- Cautín Street
- Centenario Street
- Central Alleyway
- Cerro Apoquindo Street
- Cerro Azul Street
- Cerro Barón Alleyway
- Cerro Cachapoal Street
- Cerro Calán Alleyway
- Cerro Chena Alleyway
- Cerro El Ermitaño Street
- Cerro El Plomo Street
- Cerro El Roble Street
- Cerro El Toro Street
- Cerro Juncal Alleyway
- Cerro Las Tórtolas Alleyway
- Cerro Lauca Alleyway
- Cerro Leonera Alleyway
- Cerro Manquehue Street
- Cerro Ñielol Alleyway
- Cerro Ñielol Street
- Cerro Ñielol Poniente Avenue
- Cerro Ñielol Poniente Street
- Cerro Paranal Street
- Cerro Potreritos Alleyway
- Cerro San Cristóbal Street
- Cerro Tololo Alleyway
- Cerro Torrecillas Street
- Cerro Tupahue Street
- Cerro Vicuñas Alleyway
- Cinco (Los Cántaros Neighborhood)
- Cinco, Alleyway (Porvenir Neighborhood)
- Claudio Vicuña Street
- Colipi Alleyway
- Colo Colo Street
- Concepción Alleyway
- Cornelio Saavedra Street
- Cuatro Alleyway (Los Cántaros Neighborhood)
- Cuatro Alleyway (Porvenir Neighborhood)
- Dalcahue Alleyway
- Daniel de la Vega Alleyway
- David Perry Street
- Dos Alleyway (Los Cántaros Neighborhood)
- Dos Alleyway (Porvenir Neighborhood)
- El Belloto Alleyway
- El Capullo Alleyway
- El Cedrón Alleyway
- El Chagual Alleyway
- El Coirón Alleyway
- El Corcolén Alleyway
- El Espino Alleyway
- El Laurel Alleyway
- El Litre Alleyway
- El Llantén Alleyway
- El Madroño Alleyway
- El Maqui Alleyway (Los Nogales Neighborhood)
- El Maqui Alleyway (Santa Carolina Neighborhood)
- El Molino Alleyway
- El Monasterio Alleyway
- El Monte Alleyway
- El Olivillo Alleyway
- El Paico Alleyway
- El Palqui Alleyway
- El Peumo Alleyway
- El Poleo Alleyway
- El Sauco Alleyway
- El Sendero Alleyway
- El Serbal Alleyway
- El Tamarugo Alleyway
- El Tepual Alleyway
- El Trapi Alleyway
- El Yuyo Alleyway
- Ecuador Street
- Ercilla Street
- Estadio
- Félix Samaniego Alleyway
- Francisco Antonio Pinto Avenue
- Francisco Coloane Alleyway
- Francisco de Quevedo Street
- Fresia Street
- General Cruz Street
- Gustavo Adolfo Becquer Street
- Gustavo Reyes Alleyway
- Huérfanos Avenue
- Huife Alleyway
- Huingán Street
- Isaac Singer Alleyway
- Jacarandá Street
- Jacinto Benavente Street
- Jorge Amado Alleyway
- Jorge Porter Alleyway
- José Echegaray Alleyway
- José Reyes Morales Street
- Juan Enrique Rodó Alleyway
- Juan Menzi Street
- Juan Ramón Jiménez Alleyway
- Juan Rulfo Alleyway
- Juanita Otiñano Street
- Juvencio Valle Street
- Kalfu Likan Alleyway
- Kolossa Street
- La Chilca Alleyway
- La Mandarina Alleyway
- La Melisa Alleyway
- La Menta Alleyway
- La Posada Alleyway
- Las Abelias Street
- Las Alcaparras Alleyway
- Las Calabazas Alleyway
- Las Gaitas Alleyway
- Las Hualtatas Alleyway
- Las Lengas Alleyway
- Las Llaretas Alleyway
- Las Mariposas Street
- Las Murtas Alleyway
- Las Nalcas Alleyway
- Las Pitas Alleyway
- Las Sequoias Alleyway
- Las Tepas Alleyway
- Leufu Ko Alleyway
- Lilen Alleyway
- Llanes Alleyway
- Loncomilla Street
- Lope de Vega Alleyway
- Los Ajenjos Alleyway
- Los Ajenjos Street
- Los Ángeles Alleyway
- Los Arándanos Alleyway
- Los Bambúes Alleyway
- Los Chequenes Alleyway
- Los Endrinos Street
- Los Eneldos Alleyway
- Los Hinojos Alleyway
- Los Hinojos Street
- Los Nopales Alleyway
- Los Olivillos Alleyway
- Los Perales Alleyway
- Los Pinares Street
- Luigi Pirandello Alleyway
- Luis Cornejo Alleyway
- Luis de Góngora Alleyway
- Luis Picasso Vallebouna Street
- Maestranza Street
- Mandarino Alleyway
- Manuel Antonio Matta Street
- Mar Cantábrico Street
- Mariano Azuela Alleyway
- Marina Street
- Mariñán Alleyway
- Marta Brunet Street
- Martín Drouilly Street
- Melín Alleyway
- Michay Alleyway
- Michay Street
- Miguel Hernández Alleyway
- Milla Rayen Street
- Ministro Zenteno Street
- Moneda Street
- Monteverde Road
- Moreno Street
- Morera Alleyway
- Muérdago Street
- Nahuelbuta Street
- Navia Alleyway
- Nevado de Chillán Street
- Nevado de Sollipulli Street
- Nevado Llaima Street
- Nevado Lonquimay Street
- Nevado Ojos del Salado Street
- Nevado San Francisco Street
- Nevado Tres Cruces Street
- Ñielol Alleyway
- No name street (access to Endesa Neighborhood)
- No name street (access to Festhouse bar)
- No name street (northeast of Vista Golf Condominium and northwest of Vista Volcán Neighborhood)
- No name street (southeastern limit of Endesa Neighborhood)
- Ocho Alleyway
- Odas Elementales Alleyway
- Orella Street
- Pacífico Street
- Paillal Alleyway
- Palmilla Alleyway
- Parcela 6
- Paseo Los Queules Street
- Paseo Los Tineos Street
- Payen Somo Alleyway
- Pedro Cartes Alleyway
- Penco Alleyway
- Pérez Rosales
- Perquenco Alleyway
- Portal Avenue
- Quillay Street
- Rafael de León Alleyway
- Ramón Valle Inclán Alleyway
- Rancagua Alleyway
- Rancagua Street
- Reyes Católicos Street
- Romerillo Alleyway
- Roni Bandini Street
- Rosa Basoalto Opazo Street
- Rosa Mosqueta Alleyway
- Rucaray Alleyway
- Rudecindo Ortega Avenue
- Rudecindo Ortega Street
- Santa Inés Street
- Santiago Alleyway
- Santiago Herrera Alleyway
- Santiago Watt Alleyway
- Seis Alleyway
- Tacna Street
- Talca Street
- Talcahuano Alleyway
- Temuco Street
- Tirso de Molina Street
- Trayen Ko Alleyway
- Tres Alleyway (Los Cántaros Neighborhood)
- Tres Alleyway (Porvenir and Unión Porvenir Neighborhoods)
- Trinidad Candia Marverde Alleyway
- Tucapel Street
- Unión Norte Street
- Uno Alleyway (Los Cántaros Neighborhood)
- Uno Alleyway (Porvenir Neighborhood)
- Valdivia Street
- Valeriana Alleyway
- Valle de Asturias Street
- Valle de Estrellas Alleyway
- Valle de Lluvias Alleyway
- Valle de Sol Alleyway
- Valparaíso Avenue
- Vicente Blasco Ibáñez Alleyway
- Vicente Pérez Rosales Street
- Ziem Street

=== Urban buses ===
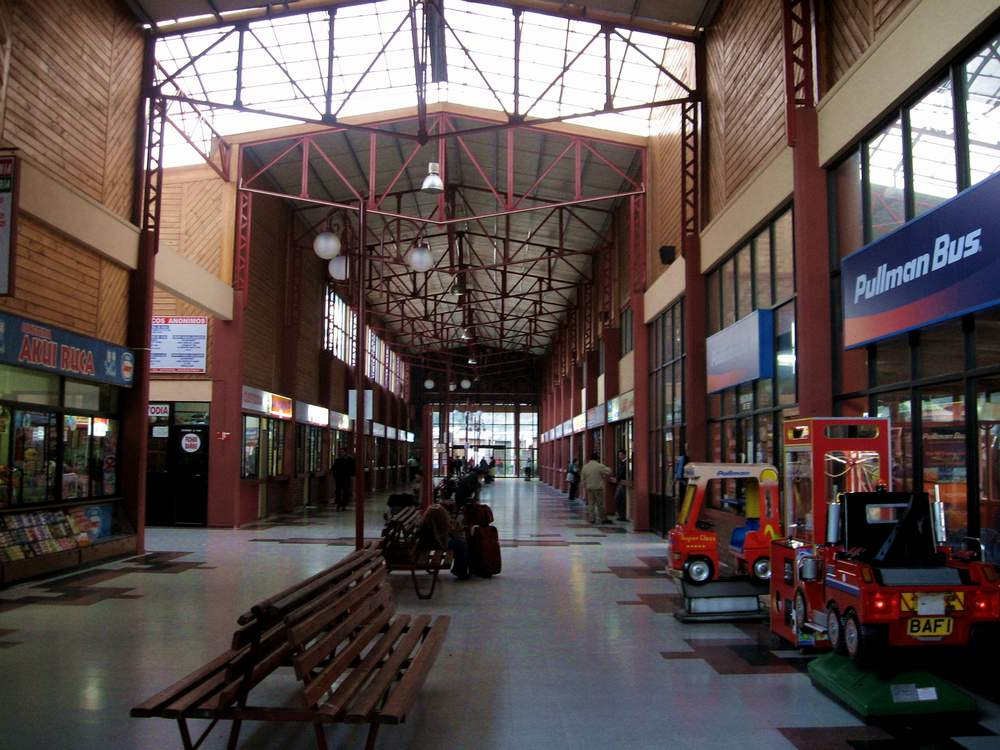
Rodoviario de La Araucanía, interurban buses station, in Pueblo Nuevo.

- Line 1A: Cajón-Altos de Maipo
- Line 1B: Cajón-Labranza
- Line 1C: Cajón-Labranza
- Line 1D: Cajón-Amanecer
- Line 2A: Road to Cajón-Santa Elena de Maipo
- Line 2B: Road to Cajón-Labranza
- Line 2C: Road to Cajón-Labranza
- Line 2D: Road to Cajón-University of La Frontera
- Line 4A: Road to Labranza-Vista Volcán
- Line 4B: Road to Labranza-Cajón
- Line 6A: Los Ríos Neighborhood-El Carmen
- Line 6B: Los Ríos Neighborhood-Chivilcán
- Line 6C: Los Ríos Neighborhood-Quepe
- Line 7A: El Carmen-Cajón
- Line 7B: El Carmen-San Juan Pablo II Campus
- Line 9B: El Carmen-Parque Alcántara
- Line 9C: Portal San Francisco-Los Trapiales
- Line 9D: El Carmen-Los Trapiales
- Line 66A: Pillanlelbún-Quepe

==== Line 10A ====
Until Monday, May 9, 2022, line 10A passed through Pueblo Nuevo and reached the San Juan Pablo II Campus of Temuco Catholic University, but the route was eliminated because, according to the company in charge of the tender, there was a lack of personnel to drive the buses.

=== Share taxis ===
- Line 11P: Portal de La Frontera-Rodoviario de La Araucanía
- Line 17: Pueblo Nuevo-Caupolicán Neighborhood
- Line 17A: Pueblo Nuevo-El Carmen
- Line 20: Chivilcán-Parque Costanera 2
- Line 111 Altamira: Rodoviario de La Araucanía-Altamira
- Line 111 Los Pablos: Rodoviario de La Araucanía-Los Pablos
- Line 111 Pehuén: Rodoviario de La Arucanía-Parque Pehuén

=== Metro ===
The Chilean Chamber of Construction proposed, in 2010, to build a metropolitan railway in Greater Temuco, to solve the transportation problems that will be generated, in the medium term, by the increase in population in the conurbation. The stations proposed for Pueblo Nuevo Quarter are:

==== Line 1 ====
| Station | Location | Surroundings |
|---|---|---|
| Huérfanos | Barros Arana Avenue, crossing of Huérfanos Avenue | Evaristo Marín, Porvenir y Los Trapiales Neighborhoods; Costanera del Cautín Quarter Border |
| Casa de Máquinas | Barros Arana Avenue, crossing of Valparaíso Avenue | Casa de Máquinas Neighborhood; Costanera del Cautín Quarter Border |

=== Metrotren Araucanía ===
Metrotren Araucanía is a railway project that, initially, would link the city of Temuco and the commune of Gorbea. The section between Temuco and Gorbea Stations was announced on September 3, 2019, by the Government of Chile, but on June 11, 2021, two stops were added to the route, located north of Temuco Station, on the limit of Pueblo Nuevo and Costanera del Cautín Quarters. These stations were:

| Station | Location | Surroundings |
|---|---|---|
| Vista Volcán | Barros Arana Avenue, crossing of Nevado Lonquimay Street | Vista Volcán Neighborhood. El Trébol supermarket Costanera del Cautín Quarter Border |
| Huérfanos | Barros Arana Avenue, crossing of Huingan Street | Don Rosauro II Neighborhood. Costanera del Cautín Quarter Border |

The entry into operation of the first stage, between Vista Volcán and Padre Las Casas 2, had been planned for August 2022; however, in May 2022, the mayor of Padre Las Casas, Mario González, recognized that the project had been left deadlocked in the Ministry of Social Development, and that it had to start from scratch with money from the State Railway Company. This situation implied that, at that time, only two stations were considered on the route: Temuco and Padre Las Casas 2, with the construction of the rest of the previously announced stops being suspended, including those located on the border between Pueblo Nuevo and Costanera del Cautín.

== Trade ==
In Pueblo Nuevo, there is the Ñielol Gastronomic District, an initiative of different traditional Chilean food establishments, born in 2015. It is located near Ñielol Hill, with General Cruz, General Mackenna, Manuel Antonio Matta and Tucapel Streets, and Caupolicán Avenue as main road arteries.

Between 2010 and 2014, when the southern limit of the quarter reached Balmaceda Avenue, it owned a commercial area around Feria Pinto market, which is currently part of Temuco Downtown.

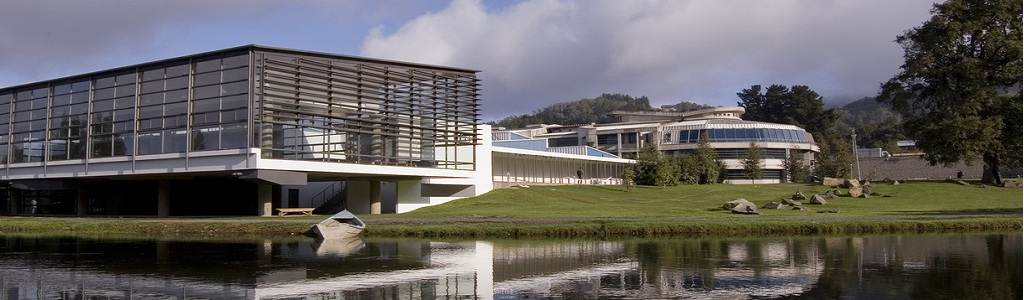
San Juan Pablo II Campus of Temuco Catholic University.

== Education ==
- Temuco Catholic University:
  - Doctor Luis Rivas del Canto Campus.
  - San Juan Pablo II Campus.
- Pueblo Nuevo Polytechnic High School.
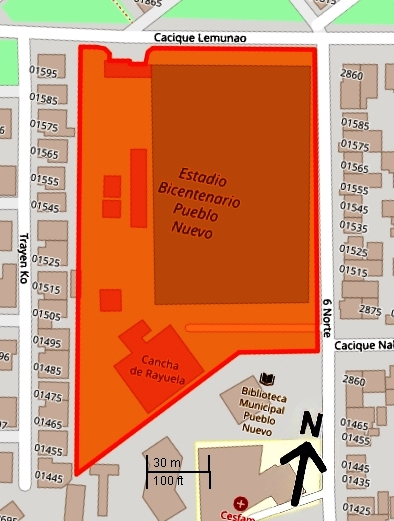
  Surroundings map of Pueblo Nuevo Stadium.

== Sports ==
=== Pueblo Nuevo Stadium ===
Pueblo Nuevo Stadium is a sports venue that has a football pitch with synthetic grass, stands for the public, and dressing rooms, in addition to a court of rayuela, a national sport in Chile. There, sports competitions of various organizations and clubs are held, as well as workshops organized by the Municipality of Temuco. It is located on 2750, Cacique Lemunao Street.

=== Other sport venues ===
- Ñielol Sports Field.

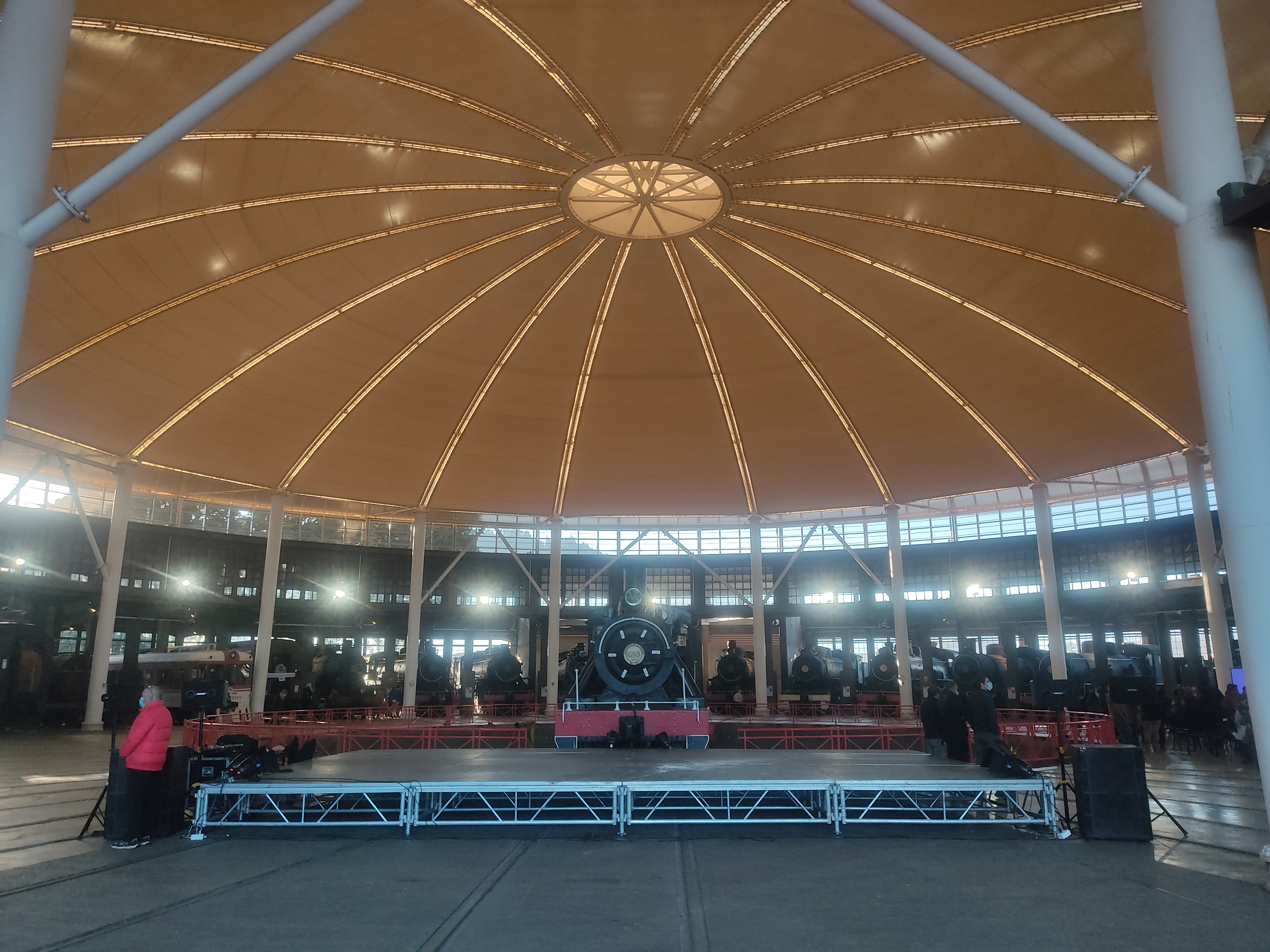
Railway roundhouse of the railway museum in Temuco.

== Security ==
- Fifth Fire Station

== See also ==
- Temuco
