= Ferreñafe =

Coordinates: 6°43′05.73″S 79°46′13″W

- City
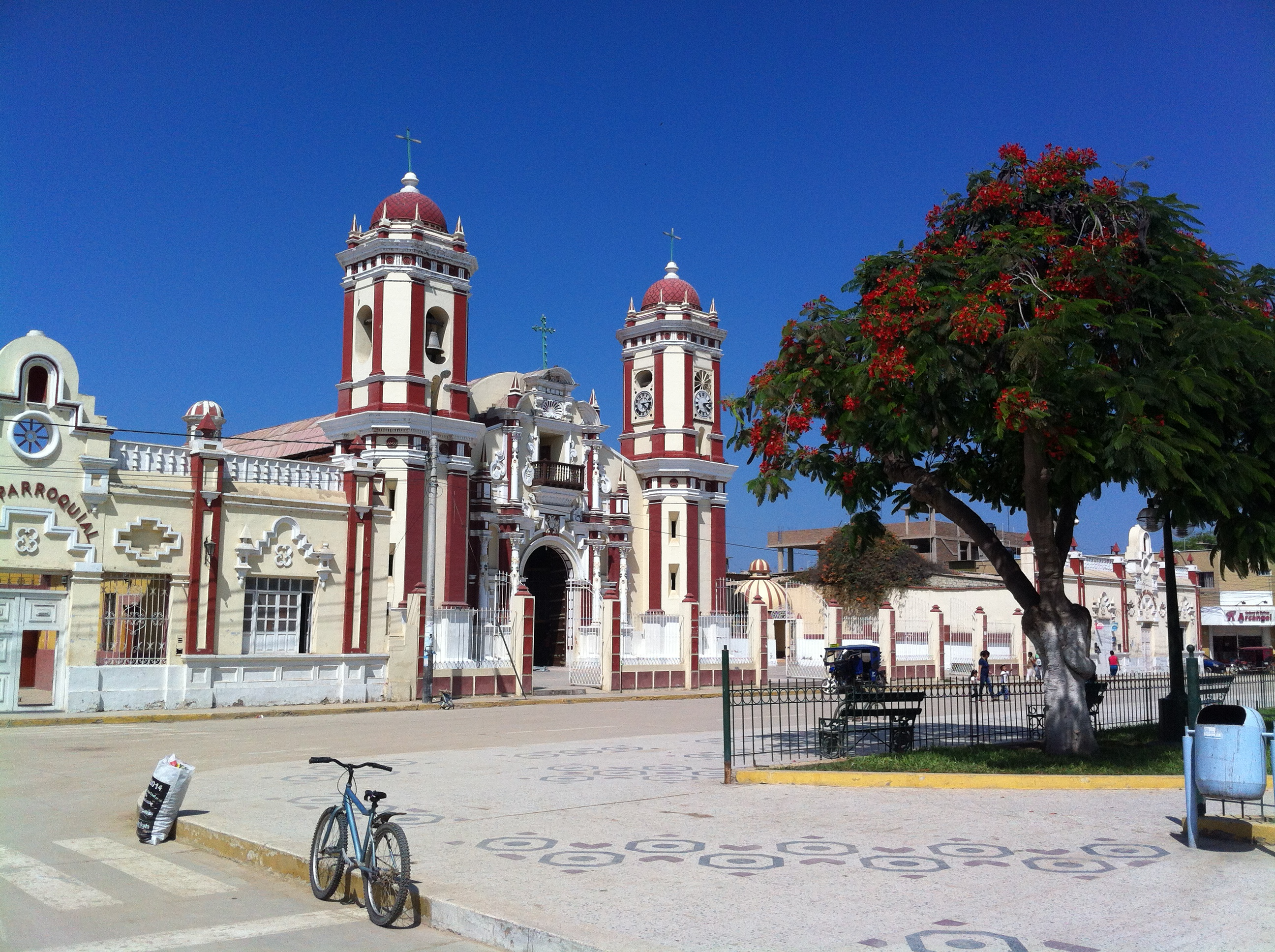
- Santa Lucia church in the town's main plaza

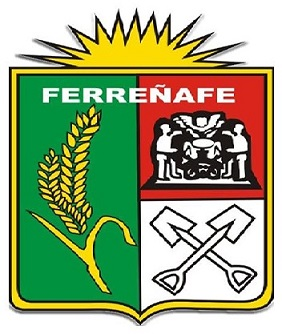
- Seal
- Nickname: Tierra de la Doble Fe ("Land of the Double Faith")
- Interactive map of Ferreñafe
- Location within Peru
- Country: Peru
- Region: Lambayeque
- Province: Ferreñafe
- District: Ferreñafe

Government
  - Mayor: Polanski Carmona Cruz
- Elevation: 67 m (220 ft)

Population (2017)
  - Estimate (2015): 47,082
  - Metro: 49,231
- Time zone: UTC-5 (PET)
- Postal code: 14310
- Area code: 074
- Website: www.muniferrenafe.gob.pe/websitempf/

Ferreñafe (Mochica: Firruñap) is a town in Northern Peru, capital of the province Ferreñafe in the region Lambayeque.

== Overview ==
Ferreñafe was founded on December 13, 1550, by captain Alonso de Osorio. Before the arrival of the Spanish, an early civilization lived in the area, The Sican. The Sican culture existed long before the Incas, and adopted themselves to the geography of Ferreñafe. The Sican built pyramids and buried their family lineage in forms that attract scholars from different fields of study. Sican National Museum is the main centre of interpretation to understand the culture, philosophy, architecture, life style, and hierarchy structure of the Sican.

Through the years, Ferreñafanos have learned to preserve its customs and values. Until these days, its populations strongly preserves its beliefs in Catholicism, and Shamanism as well, naming Ferreñafe the city of "the double faith".

The Sican, the Incas, The Spanish, and more recently Chinese, Japanese, among other immigration groups, have brought development in many domains, one of them Gastronomy, known as Peruvian cuisine. Years of history, have brought along a developed taste for food and its ingredients. In fact, some ingredients are native from Ferreñafe as are portrayed in the pottery by early pre-Columbus civilization, the Sican. Ingredients such as Loche, Lucuma, among others.

There exists a cotton that grows in several different natural colours, and is originally from Ferreñafe, named "algodon nativo".

Textiles are also produced by locals in the small towns nearby the Andes.

The town has potential for agrotourism and adventure tourism, while enjoying the night life during the weekends. Birdwatching is a growing activity that can be widely practiced in the surrounding area.

In recent years, the tourism industry has occupied an important role in its economy, that was until few years ago based only in agriculture. Few hotels are available, and there is still lack of proper training for the human resources of the tourism industry.
