= Incahuasi District =

Coordinates: 6.2357°S 79.3168°W

Incahuasi Inkawasi
- District
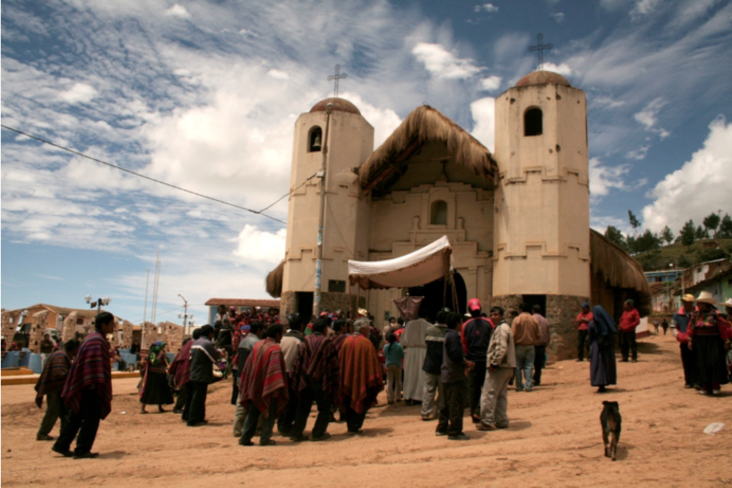
- Church of Incahuasi during a procession
- Interactive map of Incahuasi
- Country: Peru
- Region: Lambayeque
- Province: Ferreñafe
- Founded: February 17, 1951
- Capital: Incahuasi

Government
  - Mayor: William Hidalgo Manayay Manayay (2019-2022)

Area
  - Total: 443.91 km^{2} (171.39 sq mi)
- Elevation: 3,078 m (10,098 ft)

Population (2017)
  - Total: 13,858
  - Density: 31.218/km^{2} (80.854/sq mi)
- Time zone: UTC-5 (PET)
- UBIGEO: 140203

Incahuasi District or Inkawasi (Quechua Inka Inca, wasi house, "Inca house") is one of six districts of the Ferreñafe Province in the Department of Lambayeque in Peru.

== Ethnic groups ==
The people in the district are mainly indigenous citizens of Quechua descent. Quechua (Inkawasi-Kañaris Quechua) is the language which the majority of the population (85.72%) learnt to speak in childhood, 14.08% of the residents started speaking using the Spanish language (2007 Peru Census).

== Climate ==
Climate data for Incahuasi, elevation 3,052 m (10,013 ft), (1991–2020)
| Month | Jan | Feb | Mar | Apr | May | Jun | Jul | Aug | Sep | Oct | Nov | Dec | Year |
|---|---|---|---|---|---|---|---|---|---|---|---|---|---|
| Mean daily maximum °C (°F) | 15.7 (60.3) | 15.8 (60.4) | 16.1 (61.0) | 16.2 (61.2) | 16.1 (61.0) | 16.1 (61.0) | 16.0 (60.8) | 16.6 (61.9) | 17.0 (62.6) | 16.7 (62.1) | 16.8 (62.2) | 16.5 (61.7) | 16.3 (61.4) |
| Mean daily minimum °C (°F) | 7.5 (45.5) | 7.5 (45.5) | 8.0 (46.4) | 7.9 (46.2) | 7.8 (46.0) | 7.3 (45.1) | 6.9 (44.4) | 7.0 (44.6) | 7.4 (45.3) | 7.5 (45.5) | 7.3 (45.1) | 7.5 (45.5) | 7.5 (45.4) |
| Average precipitation mm (inches) | 58.3 (2.30) | 98.4 (3.87) | 121.9 (4.80) | 73.0 (2.87) | 37.6 (1.48) | 11.4 (0.45) | 8.6 (0.34) | 7.3 (0.29) | 18.7 (0.74) | 47.0 (1.85) | 41.8 (1.65) | 49.7 (1.96) | 573.7 (22.6) |
Source: National Meteorology and Hydrology Service of Peru

Climate data for Puchaca, Incahuasi, elevation 336 m (1,102 ft), (1991–2020)
| Month | Jan | Feb | Mar | Apr | May | Jun | Jul | Aug | Sep | Oct | Nov | Dec | Year |
|---|---|---|---|---|---|---|---|---|---|---|---|---|---|
| Mean daily maximum °C (°F) | 30.1 (86.2) | 30.2 (86.4) | 30.2 (86.4) | 29.4 (84.9) | 28.2 (82.8) | 27.4 (81.3) | 27.0 (80.6) | 27.0 (80.6) | 27.5 (81.5) | 27.5 (81.5) | 28.0 (82.4) | 29.1 (84.4) | 28.5 (83.3) |
| Mean daily minimum °C (°F) | 20.0 (68.0) | 20.9 (69.6) | 20.9 (69.6) | 19.8 (67.6) | 17.9 (64.2) | 16.2 (61.2) | 15.3 (59.5) | 14.9 (58.8) | 15.2 (59.4) | 15.7 (60.3) | 16.4 (61.5) | 18.2 (64.8) | 17.6 (63.7) |
| Average precipitation mm (inches) | 23.3 (0.92) | 81.6 (3.21) | 137.8 (5.43) | 31.3 (1.23) | 6.1 (0.24) | 1.0 (0.04) | 0.7 (0.03) | 0.5 (0.02) | 1.2 (0.05) | 4.5 (0.18) | 5.1 (0.20) | 5.0 (0.20) | 298.1 (11.75) |
Source: National Meteorology and Hydrology Service of Peru
