= Ferreñafe province =

Coordinates: 6.636005°S 79.789860°W

Ferreñafe
- Province
- Coat of arms

- Location of Ferreñafe in the Lambayeque Region
- Interactive map of Ferreñafe
- Country: Peru
- Region: Lambayeque
- Founded: 17 February 1951
- Capital: Ferreñafe

Government
  - Mayor: Violeta Patricia Muro Mesones

Area
  - Total: 1,578.6 km^{2} (609.5 sq mi)

Population
  - Total: 97,415
  - Density: 61.710/km^{2} (159.83/sq mi)
- UBIGEO: 1402
- Website: www.muniferrenafe.gob.pe

Ferreñafe is the smallest of three provinces of the Lambayeque Region in Peru.

== Boundaries ==
- North: Piura Region
- East: Cajamarca Region
- South: province of Chiclayo
- West: province of Lambayeque

== Political division ==
The province is divided into six districts, which are:

- Ferreñafe
- Cañaris
- Incahuasi
- Manuel Antonio Mesones Muro
- Pitipo
- Pueblo Nuevo

== Capital ==
The capital and main city of this province is Ferreñafe.

== Geography ==
Valleys, Andes, and rainforest.

== Places of interest ==
- Pómac Forest Historical Sanctuary
