= Chimor =

Political grouping of the Chimú culture in early Peru

Kingdom of Chimor Chimor
- c. 900–1470
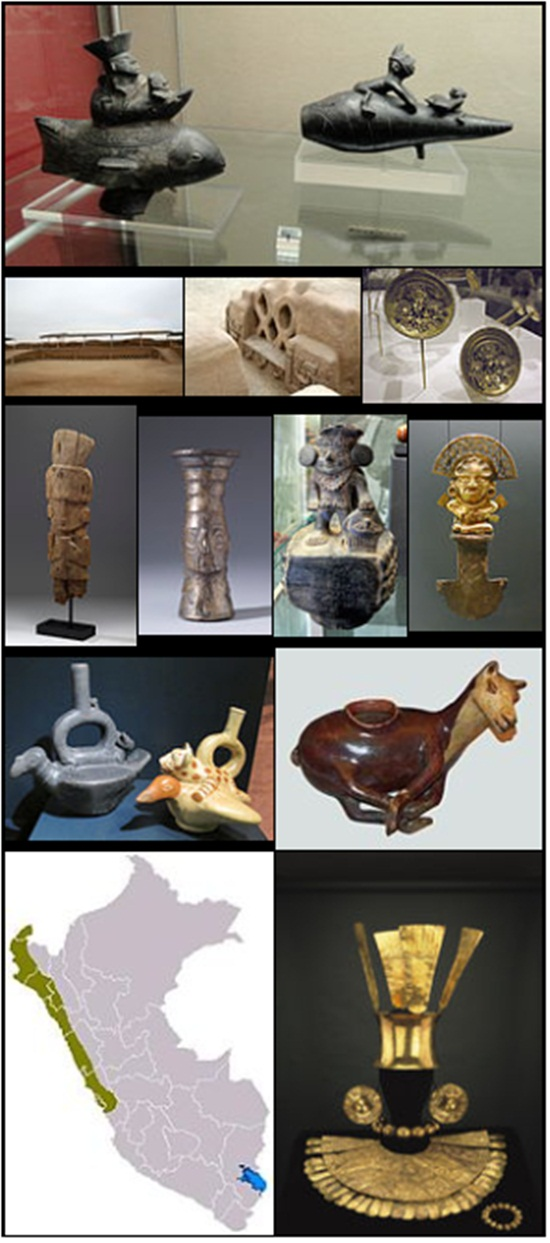
- Chimú pottery and ceramics, Chan Chan, gold ceremonial dress, a map of Chimú cultural influence within Peru
- Status: Culture
- Capital: Chan Chan
- Official languages: Quingnam
- Common languages: Mochica
- Religion: Polytheist
- Government: Monarchy
- Chimor Cápac
  - c. 1305: Taycanamo
  - c. 1340: Wakri Kaur
  - c. 1375: Ñancempinco
  - c. 1450 – c. 1470: Minchançaman
- Historical era: Late Intermediate
  - Established: c. 900
  - Inca conquest: 1470
Preceded by	Succeeded by
Wari Empire; Sican culture	Inca Empire

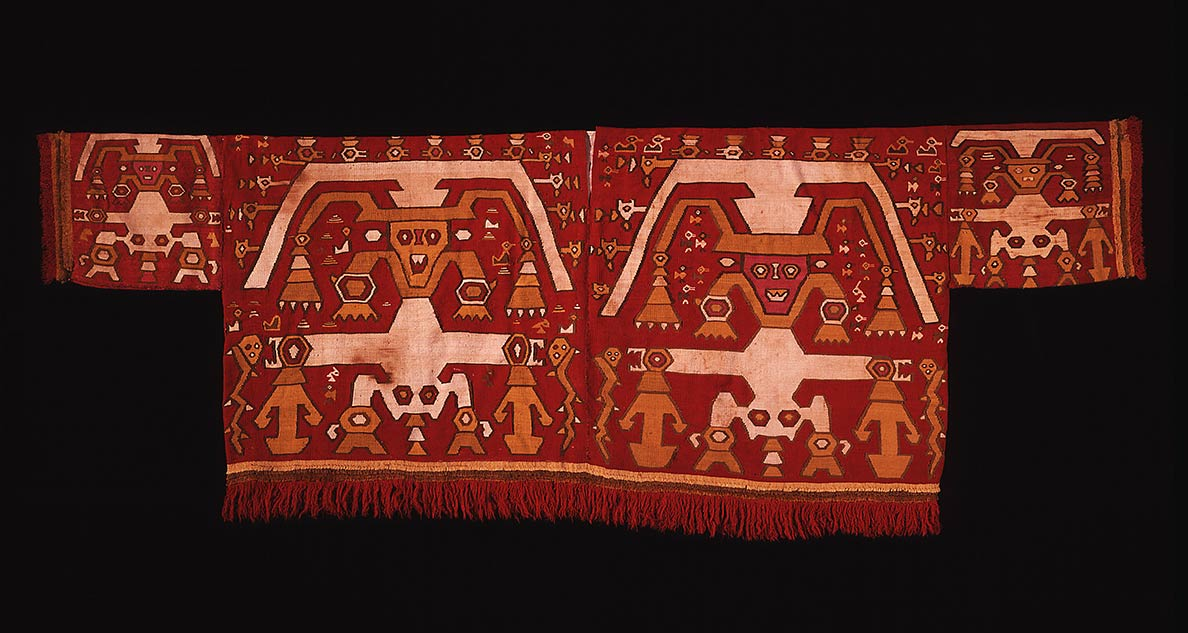
Chimú tapestry shirt, 1400–1540, Camelid fiber and cotton – Dumbarton Oaks

Chimor (also Kingdom of Chimor or Chimú Empire) was the political grouping of the Chimú culture (Spanish pronunciation: [tʃiˈmu]). The culture arose about 900 CE, succeeding the Moche culture, and was later conquered by the Inca emperor Topa Inca Yupanqui around 1470, fifty years before the arrival of the Spanish in the region. Chimor was the largest kingdom in the Late Intermediate Period, encompassing 1,000 kilometres (620 mi) of modern-day Peruvian coastline.

According to Chimú oral history, the history of Chimor began with the arrival of Taycanamo in the Moche Valley from the sea on a balsa raft. From there, his descendants would conquer surrounding areas starting with his son Guacricur. Guacricur integrated Chimú's reign over the lower valley and Ñancempinco, Taycanamo's grandson, would expand the kingdom by conquering the upper valley. Ñançenpinco began further expansion both north and south of the Moche Valleys.

The first valleys seem to have joined forces willingly, but the Sican culture was acquired through conquest. They also were significantly influenced by the pre-Inca Cajamarca and Wari cultures. According to legend, its capital of Chan Chan was founded by Taycanamo. Chimor was the last kingdom that had any chance of stopping the Inca Empire. But the Inca conquest began in the 1470s by Topa Inca Yupanqui, defeating the emperor and descendant of Taycanamo, Minchançaman, and was nearly complete when Huayna Capac assumed the throne in 1493.

The Chimú resided on a strip of desert on the northern coast of Peru. The rivers in the region carved a series of fertile valley plains, which were very flat and well-suited to irrigation. Agriculture and fishing were both very important to the Chimú economy.

The Chimú worshipped the Moon, and unlike the Inca considered it more powerful than the sun. Offerings played an important role in religious rites. A common object for offerings, as well as one used by artisans, was the shell of the Spondylus shellfish, which resides only in the warm coastal waters off present-day Ecuador. Associated with the sea, rainfall, and fertility, Spondylus shells were highly valued and traded by the Chimú people, and the exchange of the shells played a significant economic and political role in the empire.

The Chimú people are best known for their distinctive monochromatic pottery and fine metal working of copper, gold, silver, bronze, and tumbaga (copper and gold). The pottery is often in the shape of a creature or has a human figure sitting or standing on a cuboid bottle. The shiny black finish of most Chimú pottery was achieved by firing the pottery at high temperatures in a closed kiln, which prevented oxygen from reacting with the clay.

== History ==
=== Early Chimú (Moche civilization) ===
The oldest civilization present on the north coast of Peru is the Moche or Mochica civilization, which is identified as Early Chimú. The start of this period is not known for certain, but it ended around 700. It was centered in the Chicama, Moche, and Viru Valleys. "Many large pyramids are attributed to the Early Chimú period." (37) These pyramids are built of adobe in rectangular shapes made from molds. "Early Chimú cemeteries are also found without pyramid associations. Burials are usually in extended positions in prepared tombs. The rectangular, adobe-lined and covered tombs have niches in their walls in which bowls were placed". (39)

The early pottery is also characterized by realistic modeling and painted scenes.

=== Expansion and rule ===
Map of the area of control and influence of the Chimor culture.

==== Expansion ====
During the reign of the Wari Empire over Peru, the mature Chimú culture developed in roughly the same territory where the Mochica had existed centuries before. The Chimú was also a coastal culture – according to legend, its capital of Chan Chan was founded by Taycanamo, who arrived in the area by sea. It was developed in the Moche Valley north of present-day Lima, northeast of Huarmey, and finishing in central present-day Trujillo. Later, it expanded to Arequipa. During this time, Arequipa was framed by 3 volcanoes. (39)

The Chimú appeared in the year 900. Chimor, also known as the Kingdom of Chimor, had its capital "at the great site now called Chanchan, between Trujillo and the sea, and we may assume that Taycanamo founded his kingdom there. His son, Guacri-caur, conquered the lower part of the valley and was succeeded by a son named Nancen-pinco who really laid the foundations of the Kingdom by conquering the head of the valley of Chimor and the neighboring valleys of Sana, Pacasmayo, Chicama, Viru, Chao and Santa."

The estimated founding date of the last Chimú kingdom is in the first half of the fourteenth century. Nacen-pinco was believed to have ruled around 1370 and was followed by seven rulers whose names are not yet known. Minchançaman followed these rulers, and was ruling around the time of the Inca conquest (between 1462 and 1470). This great expansion is believed to have occurred during the late period of Chimú civilization, called: Late Chimú, but the development of the Chimú territory spanned a number of phases and more than a single generation. Nacen-pinco, "may have pushed the imperial frontiers to Jequetepeque and to Santa, but conquest of the entire region was an agglutinative process initiated by earlier rulers". (17)

The Chimú expanded to include a vast area and many different ethnic groups. The first valleys seem to have joined forces willingly, but the Sican culture was assimilated through conquest. At its peak, the Chimú advanced to the limits of the desert coast to the valley of the Jequetepeque River in the north. Pampa Grande in the Lambayeque Valley was also ruled by the Chimú.

To the south, they expanded as far as Carabayllo. Their expansion southward was stopped by the military power of the great valley of Lima. Historians and archeologists contest how far south they managed to expand.

===== Life in the Chimú Empire =====
From what scholars can tell the Chimú had a complex and consolidated empire. The capitol consisted of Chan Chan, lower-class, workshops and homes with a population estimate of around 30,000. These workshops were all built in around adobe palaces in order to impose social hierarchy ideals. The Chan Chan also had restrictions and were not offered the same privileges as the elite. They had limited access to rituals, bureaucracy, and administrative roles. The high regulations were necessary to keep order with food production and state re-distribution of the products. The class system also helped to determine who would work to create state-sponsored monuments.

==== Rule ====
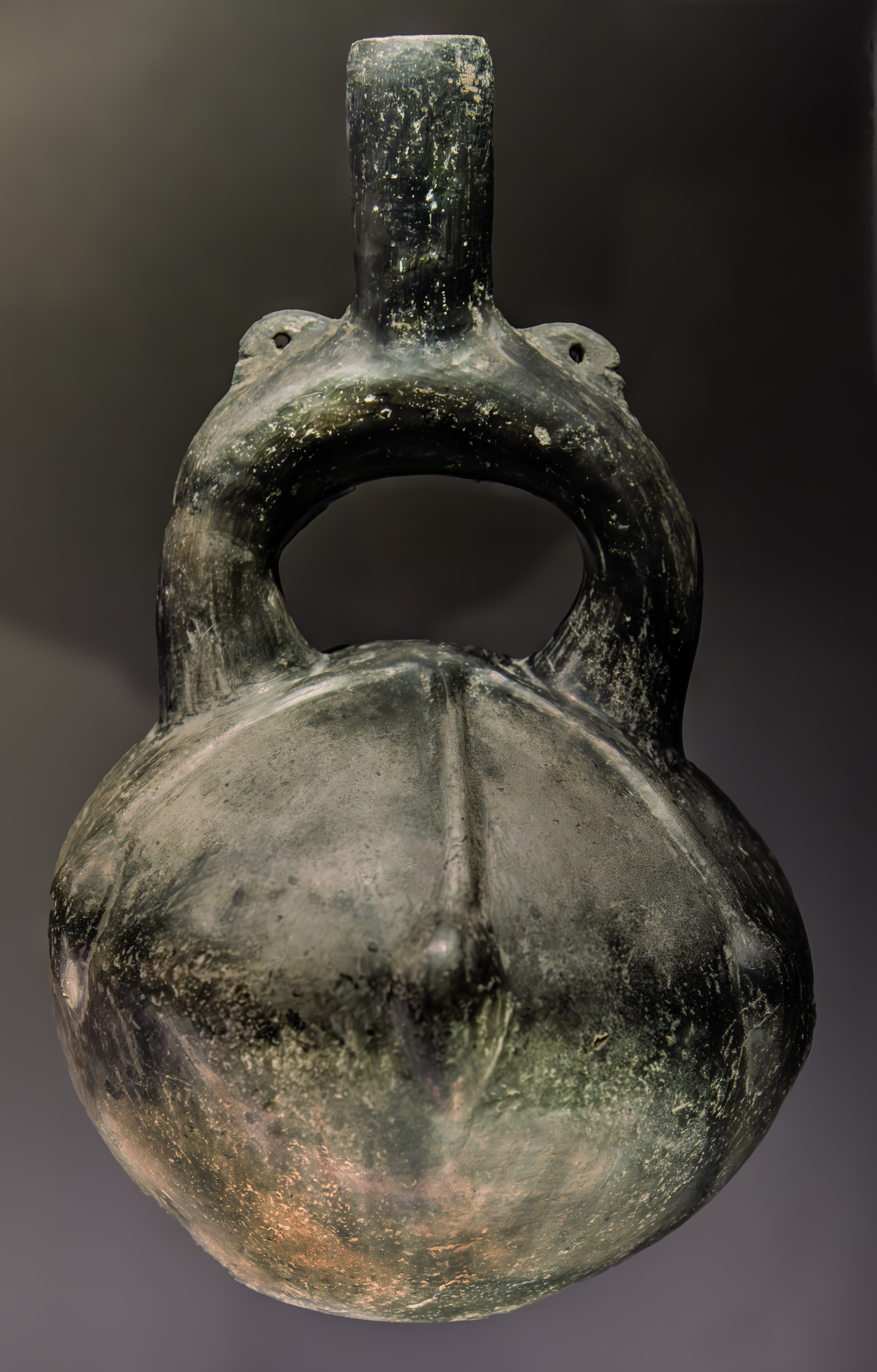
Vase decorated with a representation of chili peppers (aji), Musée des Amériques

The Chimú society was a four-level hierarchical system, with a powerful elite rule over administrative centers. The hierarchy was centered at the walled cities, later called ciudadelas by the Spanish, at Chan Chan. The political power at Chan Chan is demonstrated by the organization of labor to construct the Chimú's canals and irrigated fields.

Chan Chan was the top of the Chimu hierarchy, with Farfán in the Jequetepeque Valley as a subordinate. This organisation, which was quickly established during the conquest of the Jequetepeque Valley, suggests the Chimú established the hierarchy during the early stages of their expansion. The existing elite at peripheral locations, such as the Jequetepeque Valley and other centers of power, were incorporated into the Chimú government on lower levels of the hierarchy. These lower-order centers managed land, water, and labor, while the higher-order centers either moved the resources to Chan Chan or carried out other administrative decisions. Rural sites were used as engineering headquarters while the canals were being built; later they operated as maintenance sites. The numerous broken bowls found at Quebrada del Oso support this theory, as the bowls were probably used to feed the large workforce that built and maintained that section of canal. The workers were probably fed and housed at state expense.

===== Cultural and economic exchange =====
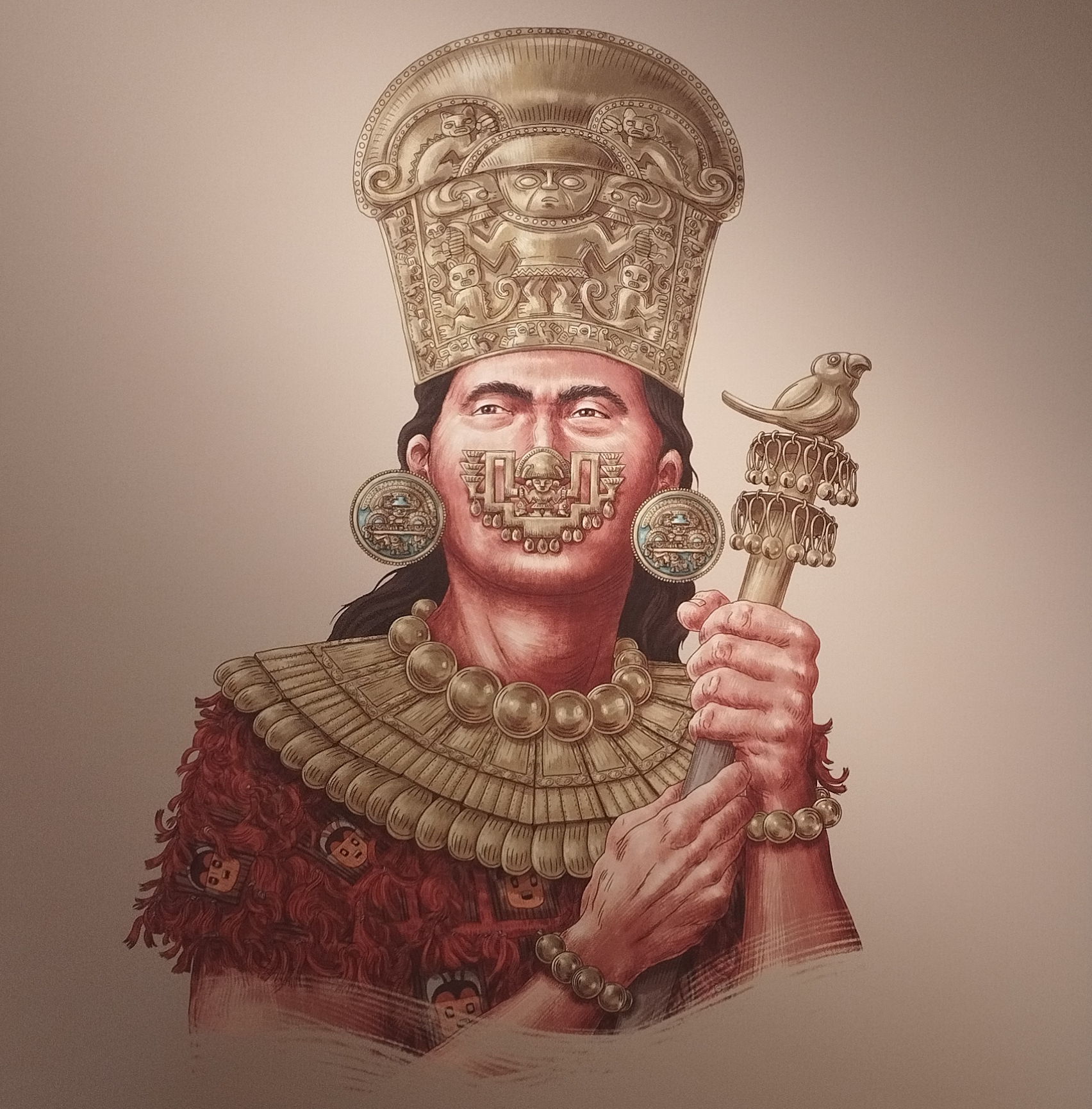
A modern illustration of Minchançaman from the National Museum of Peru.

The Chimú's vast territorial expansion increased the amount of cultural identities within the civilization. They also incorporated political ideologies along with cultural beliefs this is seen with the Late Sicán in the north and the Casma in the South. Despite this, many areas kept distinctive aspects of their culture and some gained autonomy after the conquest.

It has been argued that Chimú leaders conquered territories further away because of the deviations in inheritance. The opposition to this is that an El Niño that had caused the state to increase the extractive economy in place and get supplies from other areas of the Andes. This El Niño is theorized to have occurred around A.D. 1100 and would have caused the destruction of irrigation canals. Both arguments suggest that agriculture expansion led to increased identities socially and politically.

The Chimú conquered the Jequetepeque around 1320 and changed the political structure of the society. Places like Pacatnamú were left behind and other sites like Farfán had increased laborers for administrative compounds constructed under the supervision of Imperial administrators. Land use, agricultural methods and settlement patterns of the Jequetepeque societies all changed after the conquest. Many households had to see tribute requirements and agricultural production increased.

The Chimú Empire possibly played a crucial role as an intermediary in extensive trans-Andean trade networks that reached into the Amazon basin. Landscape resistance modelling indicates that northern coastal centres, particularly the Chimú capital of Chan Chan, were situated along highly efficient trade corridors connecting the Amazonian slopes to the central coast of Peru. Through these networks, the Chimú likely facilitated the exchange of exotic luxury goods, such as live Amazonian parrots (including various macaw species) sourced by upper Amazonian groups like the Chachapoyas. These birds were subsequently traded southward via established coastal routes to other polities, such as the Ychsma at Pachacamac, to supply vibrant tropical feathers for elite funerary ornaments.

==== Downfall ====
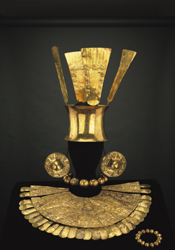
Gold adornments of the Chimú dated to about 1300 – Larco Museum

The state governed such social classes until the empire of the Sican culture conquered the kingdom of Lambayeque, Peru. The legends of war were said to have been told by the leaders Naylamp in the Sican language and Taycanamo in Chimú. The people paid tribute to the rulers with products or labor.

Chimor was the last Andean kingdom capable of stopping the Inca Empire, but the Inca conquest was begun in the 1470s by Topa Inca Yupanqui, who defeated the emperor Minchançaman, and was nearly complete when Huayna Capac assumed the throne in 1493. They moved Minchançaman, the final Chimú emperor, to Cusco and redirected gold and silver there to adorn the Qurikancha. The Chimu Empire was the largest polity conquered by the Inca.

== Economy ==
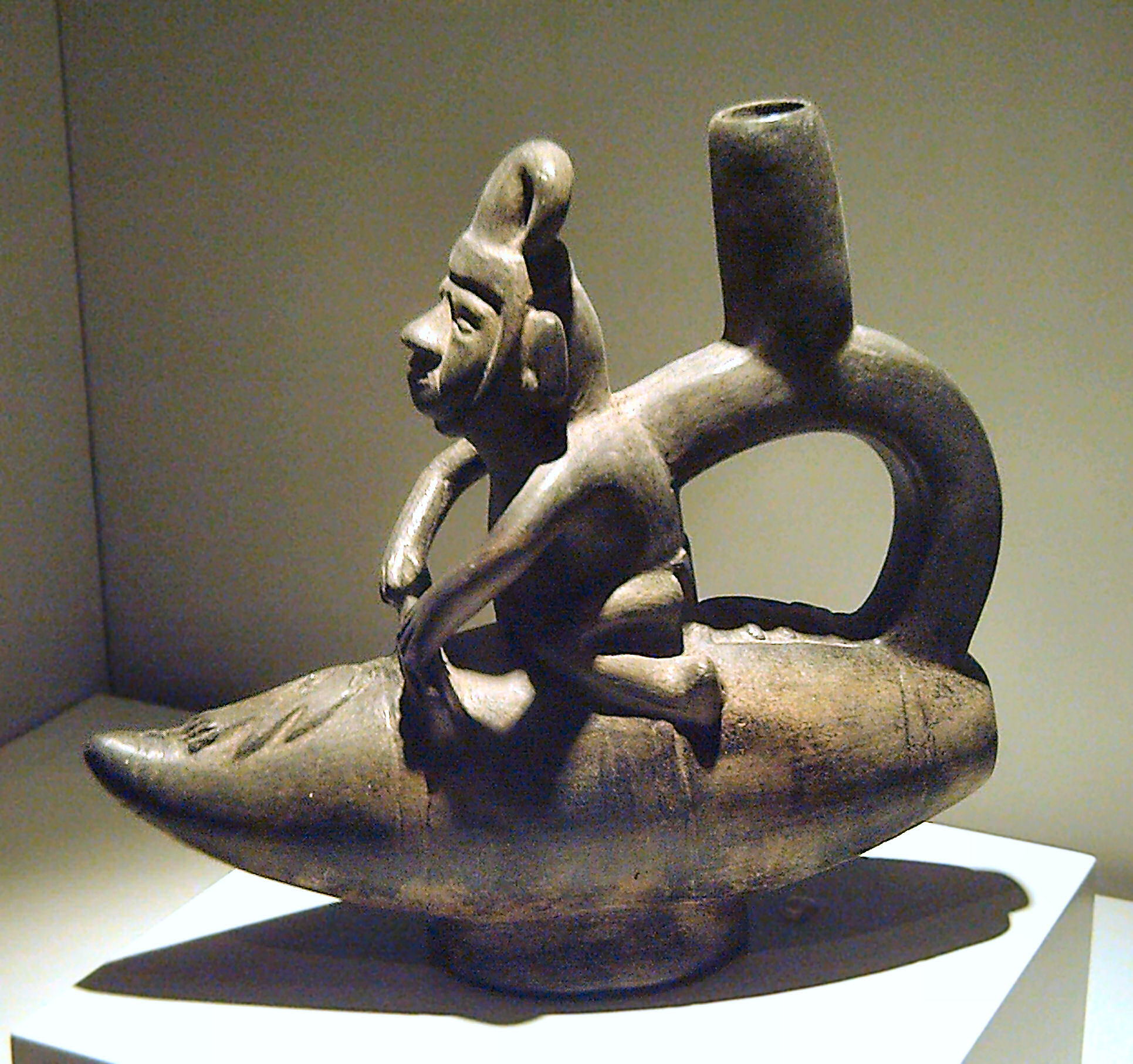
Chimú vessel representing a fisherman on a caballito de totora (reed watercraft), 1100–1400 – Museum of the Americas (Madrid)

Chan Chan could be said to have developed a bureaucracy due to the elite's controlled access to information. The economic and social system operated through the import of raw materials, where they were processed into prestige goods by artisans at Chan Chan. The elite at Chan Chan made the decisions on most other matters concerning organization, monopolizing production, storage of food and products, and distribution or consumption of goods.

The majority of the citizens in each ciudadela were artisans. In the late Chimú, about 12,000 artisans lived and worked in Chan Chan alone. They engaged in fishing, agriculture, craft work, and trade. Artisans were forbidden to change their profession and were grouped in the ciudadela according to their area of specialisation. Archeologists have noted a dramatic increase in Chimú craft production, and they believe that artisans may have been brought to Chan Chan from another area taken as a result of Chimú conquest. As there is evidence of both metalwork and weaving in the same domestic unit, it is likely that both men and women were artisans. They engaged in fishing, agriculture, and metallurgy and made ceramics and textiles from cotton and the wool of llama, alpaca, and vicuña. People used reed fishing canoes (displayed in the image on the right), hunted, and traded.

=== Subsistence and agriculture ===
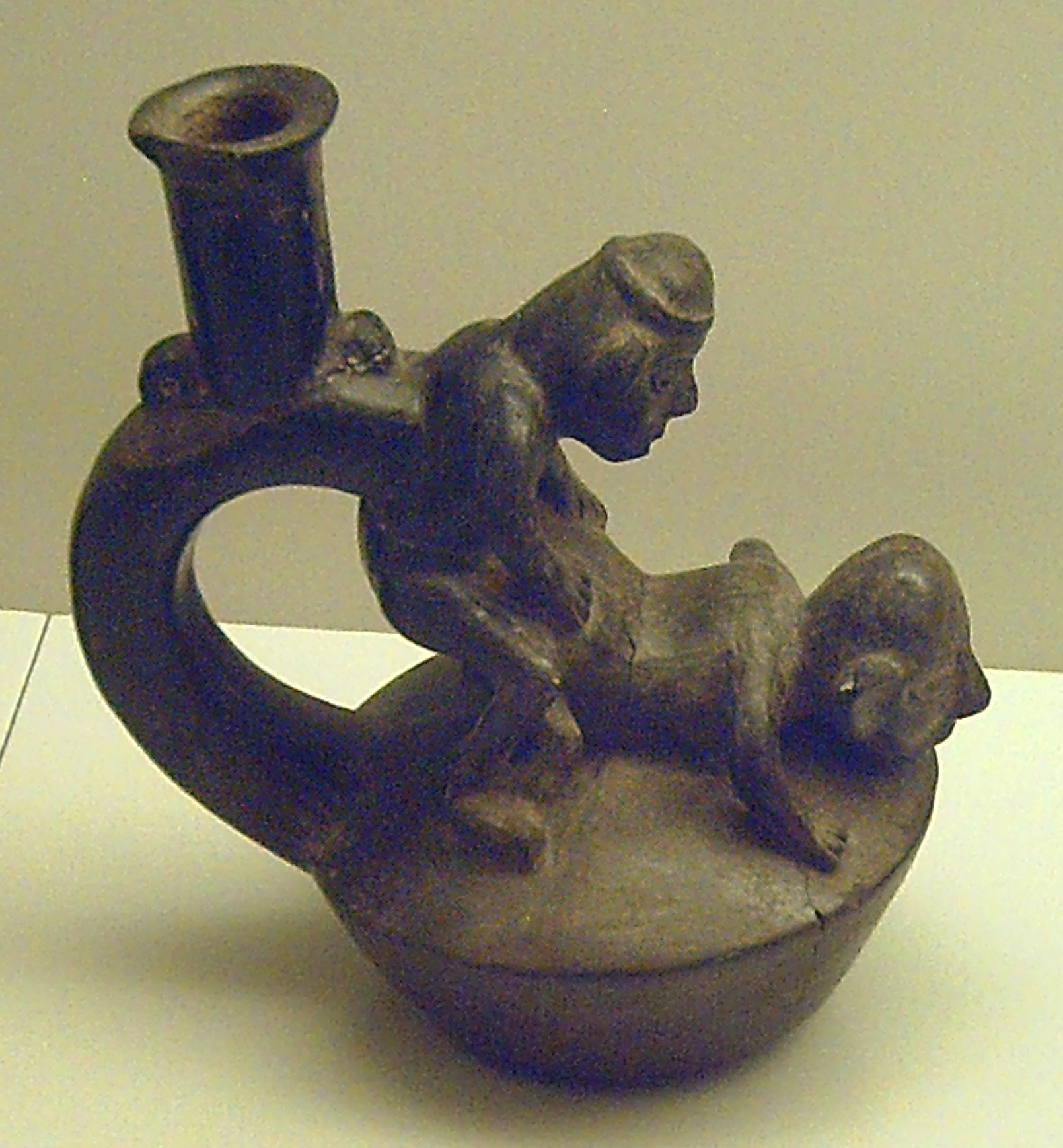
Chimú vessel showing a sexual act – Museum of the Americas, Madrid

The Chimú developed mainly through intensive farming techniques and hydraulic work, which joined valleys to form complexes, such as the Chicama-Moche complex, which was a combination of two valleys in La Libertad. The Lambayeque linked the valleys of La Leche, Lambayeque, Reque, and Saña Jequetepeque. They developed an excellent agricultural techniques which expanded the strength of their cultivated areas. Huachaques were sunken farms where land was withdrawn to work the moist, sandy soil underneath, an example of which is Tschudi.

The Chimú used walk-in wells, similar to those of the Nazca, to draw water, and reservoirs to contain the water from rivers. This system increased the productivity of the land, which increased Chimú wealth and likely contributed to the formation of a bureaucratic system. The Chimú cultivated beans, sweet potatoes, papaya, and cotton with their reservoir and irrigation system. This focus on large-scale irrigation persisted until the Late Intermediate period. At this point, there was a shift to a more specialized system that focused on importing and redistributing resources from satellite communities. There appears to have been a complex network of sites that provided goods and services for Chimú subsistence. Many of these sites produced commodities that the Chimú could not.

Many sites relied on marine resources, but after the advent of agriculture, there were more sites further inland, where marine resources were harder to obtain. Keeping llamas arose as a supplemental way of obtaining meat, but by the Late Intermediate period and Late Horizon, inland sites used llamas as a main resource, although they maintained contact with coastal sites to use supplemental marine resources. They also made masks.

==== Technology ====
One of the earliest known examples of distance communication is a Chimú device consisting of two resin-coated gourds connected by a 75-foot length of twine. Only one example has been found, and nothing is known about its originator or use.

== Split inheritance ==
The Chimu capital, Chan Chan, had a series of elite residential compounds or cuidadelas that were not occupied simultaneously but sequentially. The reason for this is that Chimu rulers practiced split inheritance, which dictated that the heir to the throne had to build his own palace. After the death of a ruler, all the ruler's wealth would be distributed to more distant relatives.

== Visual arts ==
=== Shell ===
The Chimú people highly valued mollusk shell for its economic and political significance as a luxury good traded over long distances, and the shell was often viewed as a symbol of elite status and divine power. Using shell as a medium for their art and artifacts, the Chimú frequently employed the shell of Spondylus a type of marine bivalve mollusk.

The most abundant Spondylus species present in Peru are Spondylus calcifer Carpenter and Spondylus princeps Broderip, Spondylus calcifer has red and white hues, primarily used for beads and artifacts. While this species resides in shallower waters and is easier to obtain, the Spondylus princeps, known as the "thorny oyster" for its characteristic spines, is a solid red color and can only be harvested by experienced divers. Thus, this shell was more highly desired and traded by the Chimú people.

==== Uses and symbolism ====
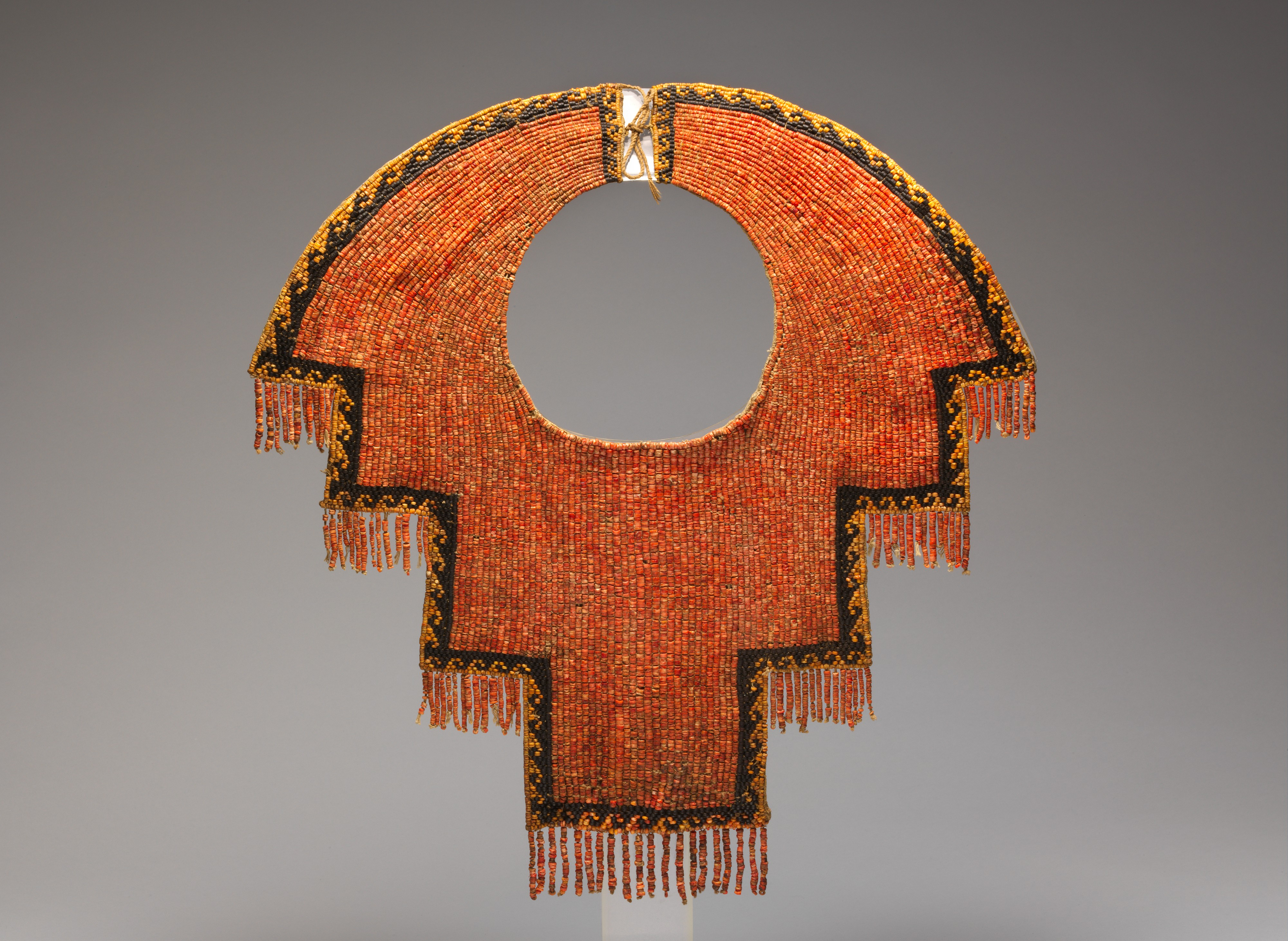
Chimú collar, twelfth-fourteenth century, made of Spondylus beads, stone beads, and cotton –Metropolitan Museum of Art

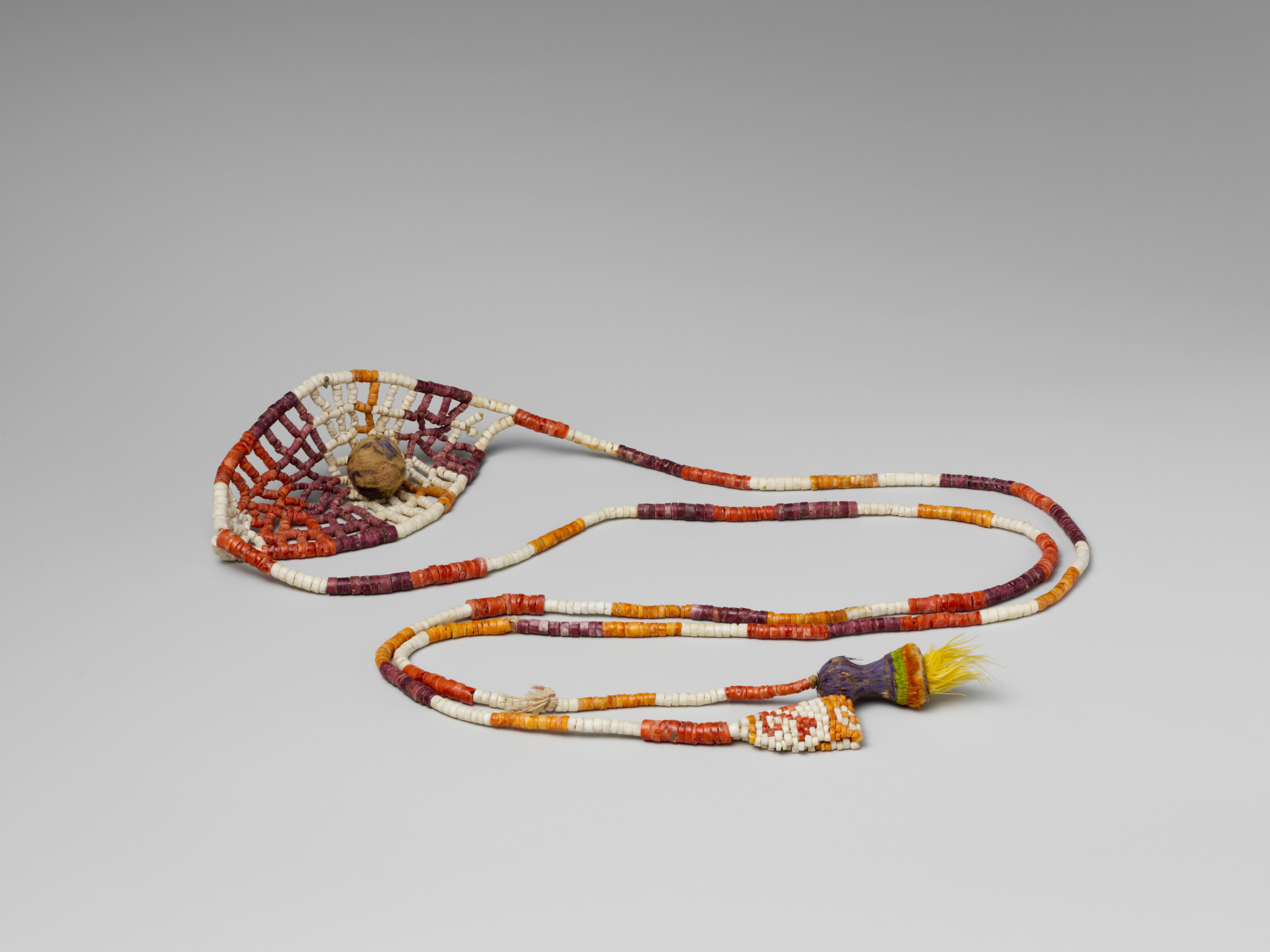
Chimú or Chancay sling shot with shells made of shell, wool, cotton, and beads – 14th–15th century, Metropolitan Museum of Art

Spondylus shell had a wide variety of uses in Andean culture and took a variety of forms, ranging from whole shells to fragments to ground shell powder. This material was worked to create intricately carved ornaments, tools, and goods reserved for the nobles and deities. Shell fragments have been found as inlays for body ornaments and as beads for pieces of jewelry. The image to the right displays a Chimú collar made of cotton, red Spondylus shell beads, and black stone beads, and the image below displays a sling shot made of shell. Representing wealth and power, the shell was ground into powder and spread out before the Chimor king by an official called the Fonga Sigde, forming a "red carpet" for the ruler as he walked. Shell were likewise used for ornamentation of certain buildings and architectural structures.

Found in the tombs of nobles, these artifacts were often used as burial goods and played a role in sacrificial practices. Due to its aquatic origins, shells were prized for their connection to the sea and role in water and fertility rituals, used as offerings in agricultural fields to promote abundant crop yields. The Chimú also placed shells in sources of water, such as wells and springs, to bring rain to their fields, especially in times of drought.

The symbolic significance of the Spondylus shell is closely related to the physical attributes and biological properties of the bivalve. Its characteristic morphology contributed to the association of the shell with divine power and the supernatural world. The external spines of Spondylus lend to the shell its ties to strength and protection. Because of its shape and red blood-like color, the shell often represents death, sacrifice, and ritual bloodletting practices, as well as female reproductive body parts. Known as the "daughter of the sea," the Spondylus shell has also been linked to femininity, with the univalve embodying masculinity.

Spondylus has specialized sensory organs, in particular, sensitive eyes and papillae, that Andean cultures associate with extra sensory protection. Sensitive to temperature changes in water and thriving in warmer waters, the shell was thought to have divinatory powers, and because its migratory patterns are related to El Niño conditions, its presence is seen as an omen for disaster.

Moreover, Spondylus exhibits seasonal toxicity, known as Paralytic shellfish poisoning (PSP). Twice a year, the mollusk tissue contains substances that are toxic to humans, caused by poisonous algae that the mollusks consume. During these months, the shells are offered to weather and fertility deities as "food for the gods", as it was thought that only deities were powerful enough to eat the flesh of the bivalve. At tolerable levels, human consumption of this toxic flesh may result in muscle weakness, mind-altering states, and euphoria, but in more concentrated doses, may lead to paralysis and death. Because of these hallucinogenic effects, Spondylus was a symbol of spiritual transcendence and was viewed as bridge between physical and supernatural worlds.

==== Diving ====
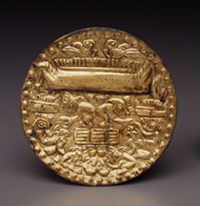
Chimú or Lambayeque earspool, Late Intermediate Period, Central Andes, made of gold-copper alloy and silver alloy – Michael C. Carlos Museum

Though the remains of shell workshops and artifacts are abundant in Chimor, the Spondylus shell originates in the warm waters of Ecuador. Harvesting the shell is both a time and labor-intensive process, requiring experienced divers to free dive to depths of up to 50 meters and pry the shells off of rocks.

The difficult task of shell diving is captured in the imagery of many portable Andean artifacts, such as bowls, earspools, and textiles. Many of these images are similar, illustrating a boat with sailors holding cords attached to the divers in the water. Stone weights are suspended from the divers as they gather shells, and portrayals of Spondylus often emphasize their characteristic spines. The image to the right features a Chimú earspool, which was molded from gold-copper and silver alloys and depicts a shell diving scene. The rectangle in the upper half of the earspool is a boat with large sails, and birds reside at the top of the piece. Four divers swim beneath the boat and are near spiky eggshell-shaped shells.

Sections of ciudadelas, large compounds often reserved for the kings and elite individuals, were used as storage areas for shell artifacts, and the architecture and ornamentation of these structures symbolize the treasures of the sea. Los Buceadores (the Divers), a relief in Chan Chan in Ciudadela Uhle, displays imagery of a pair of figures in a tule boat, one of whom holds a paddle, and another pair of shell divers beneath the boat and connected to ropes. The relief also features a net-like semicircle, as well as spiny figures that represent shells.

==== Production and trade ====
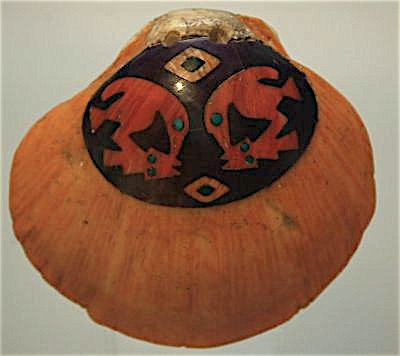
Chimú pendant, 900–1470, made of Spondylus shell and turquoise – Dumbarton Oaks

Much of the existing evidence for shell-working in the Andes stems from archaeological findings and colonial texts. Spondylus is abundant in sites across Peru, discovered in burial sites and with the remains of shell workshops. The high level of uniformity in these shell objects, combined with the technical nature of shell-working, indicate that Spondylus production was domestic and carried out by independent craftsmen. Many collections of Spondylus artifacts contain objects from various stages of shell production: whole shells, fragments, worked pieces, and debris from shell reduction. Though researchers have uncovered worked shell debris and ample proof for the presence of shell workshops, they have only identified and discussed very few specific shell workshops. One workshop, which was thought to be maintained by the Chimú people, was identified at Túcume in the Lambayeque Region of Peru by archaeologist and researcher Daniel Sandweiss. Dating back to around 1390–1480, the workshop comprised various small rooms and contained evidence for the production of Spondylus beads. Shell debris from all stages of production, ranging from cut pieces to finished beads, along with the stone tools used to work the shell, were excavated from the site.

While many archaeological sources point to the abundance of shell-working, as the remains of shell workshops and artifacts were uncovered widely in Peru, little evidence documents the movement of Spondylus from its source in Ecuador to workshops in Chan Chan. The archaeological record indicates that Chimor was an important center for the exchange of trade, and shell often traveled long distances from its geographic source to reach the empire of Chimor. The trade of Spondylus was integral to the expanding political power and economy of the Chimú. The shell was viewed as an exotic material, and the Chimor control of the exchange of the imported luxury good served as a means of political control, establishing and legitimizing the rule of the nobles. Unlike the Inca Empire, the Chimú did not attempt to expand its command of the Spondylus trade through imperial conquests of neighboring states, but rather, used its existing access to the trade as a religious and financial justification for power.

Little information exists about the means by which Spondylus was acquired and exchanged along trade routes, and many scholars have proposed various models for Spondylus movement. The marine bivalve was likely traded either through independent merchants or state-administered long-distance trade, with a north-south movement of the items. One of the first accounts of exchange of Spondylus is a report written by Spanish colonist Francisco Xerez, who was a member of the expedition led by Francisco Pizarro, and describes a raft of luxury goods, such as textiles, emeralds, and gold and silver objects, which were to be traded for Spondylus shells.

Researchers likewise disagree on the transportation methods of shells and whether they were exported via sea or land. Imagery in Andean pottery and reliefs depict llama caravans carrying shell, providing evidence that the transportation of shell was at least in part overland.

=== Textiles ===
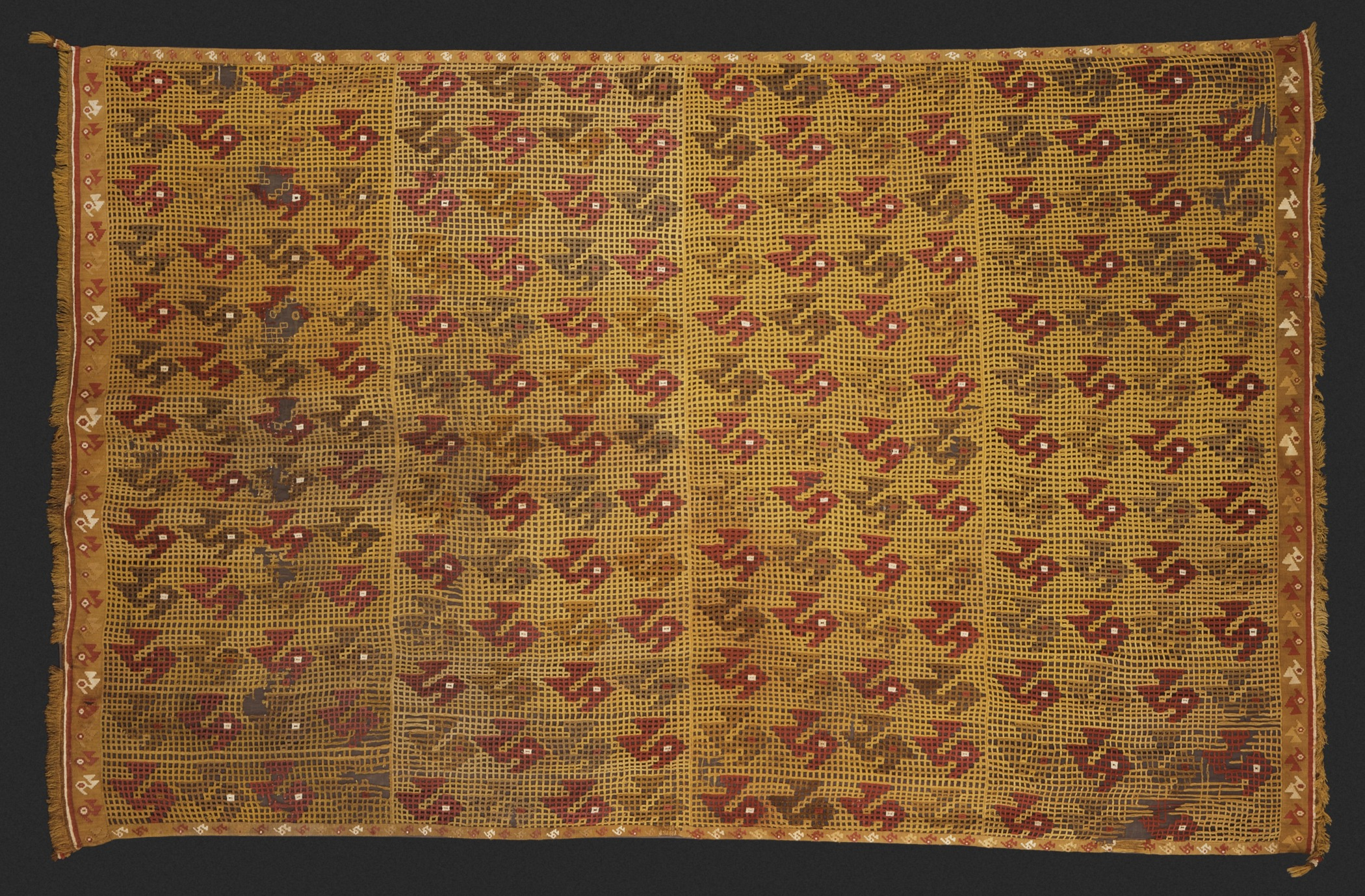
Chimú mantle, Late Intermediate Period, 1250–1350, camelid fiber and cotton tapestry weave – Los Angeles County Museum of Art (LACMA)

Spinning is the practice of combining a small set of threads to achieve a long and continuous thread with the use of an instrument called a spindle. The zone is an instrument made of a small wand that usually gets thinner at both ends; that was used alongside a tortera or piruro. The spindle is inserted into the bottom to make a counterweight. It starts spinning, taking the rueca (where the fiber was set to be spun). Fibers that are laid down in the zone are quickly turned between the thumb and index fingers and twisted to interlock the fibers, creating a long thread. After the desired lengths of threads are attained, the threads are intersected and woven in various combinations to make fabrics.

The Chimú embellished their fabrics with brocades, embroidery, fabrics doubles, and painted fabrics. Sometimes textiles were adorned with feathers and gold or silver plates. Tropical feathers used in such textiles are evidence of long-distance trade. Colored dyes were created from plants containing tannin, mole, or walnut; and minerals, such as clay, ferruginosa, or mordant aluminum; as well as from animals, such as cochineal. The garments were made of the wool of four animals: the guanaco, llama, alpaca, and vicuna. The people also used varieties of cotton, that grows naturally in seven different colors. The clothing consisted of the Chimú loincloth, sleeveless shirts with or without fringes, small ponchos, and tunics.

The majority of Chimú textiles were made from alpaca wool and cotton. Judging from the uniform spin direction, degree of the twist, and colors of the threads, it is likely that all of the fibers were pre-spun and imported from a single location.

=== Ceramics ===
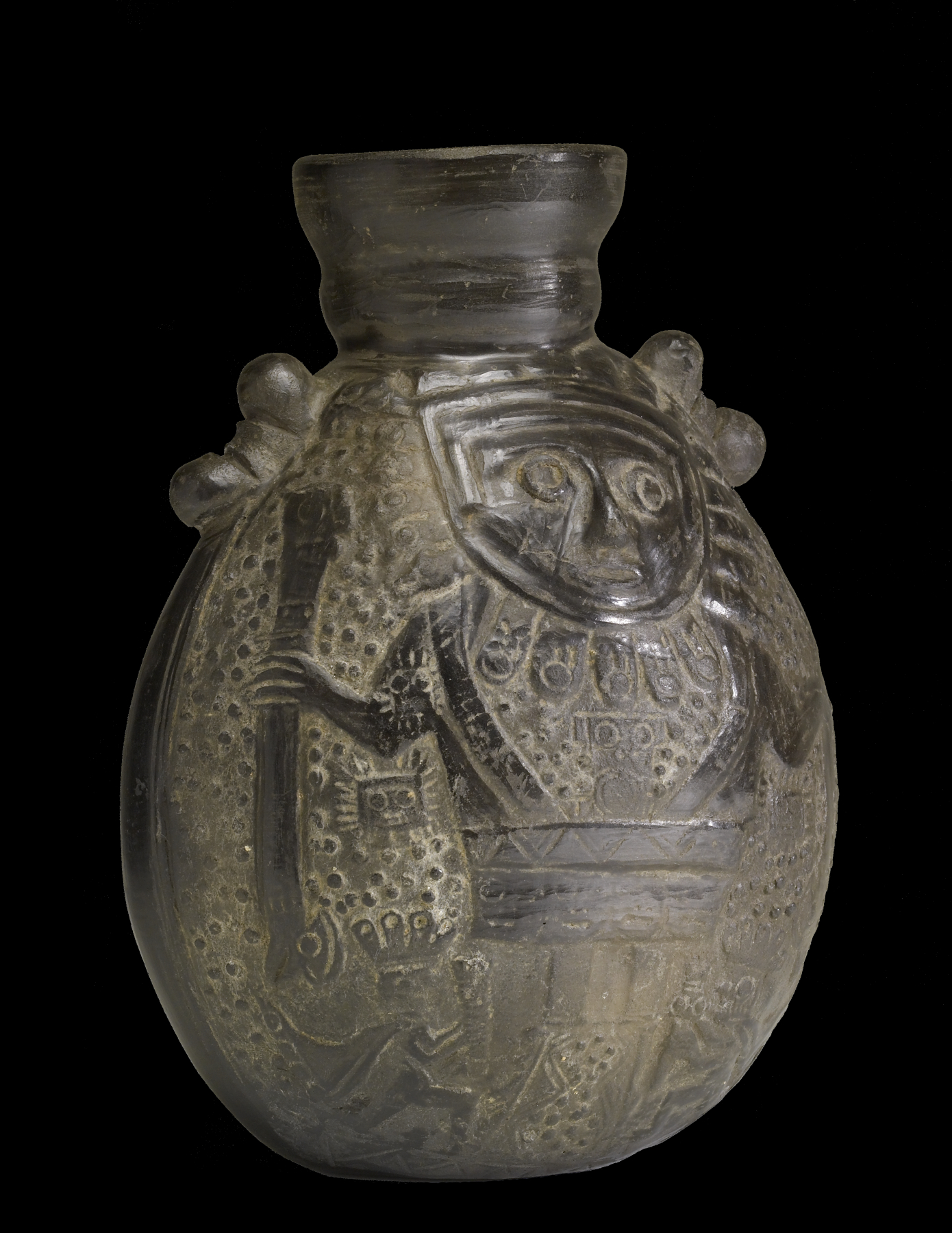
Earthenware jar, between 1100 and 1550 – Walters Art Museum

The civilization is known for its exquisite and intricate metalworking, one of the most advanced of the pre-Columbian era. Chimú ceramics were crafted for two functions: containers for daily domestic use and those made for ceremonial use for offerings at burials. Domestic pottery was developed without higher finishing, while funeral ceramics show more aesthetic refinement.

The main features of Chimú ceramics were small sculptures and manufacturing molded and shaped pottery for ceremonial or daily use. Ceramics were usually stained black, although there are some variations. Lighter ceramics were also produced in smaller quantities. The characteristic brightness was obtained by rubbing with a rock that previously had been polished. Many animals, fruits, characters, and mystical entities have been represented pictorially on Chimú ceramics. Archaeological evidence suggest that Chimor grew out of the remnants of the Moche, as early Chimú pottery had some resemblance to that of the Moche. Their ceramics are all black, and their work in precious metals is very detailed and intricate.

=== Metallurgy ===
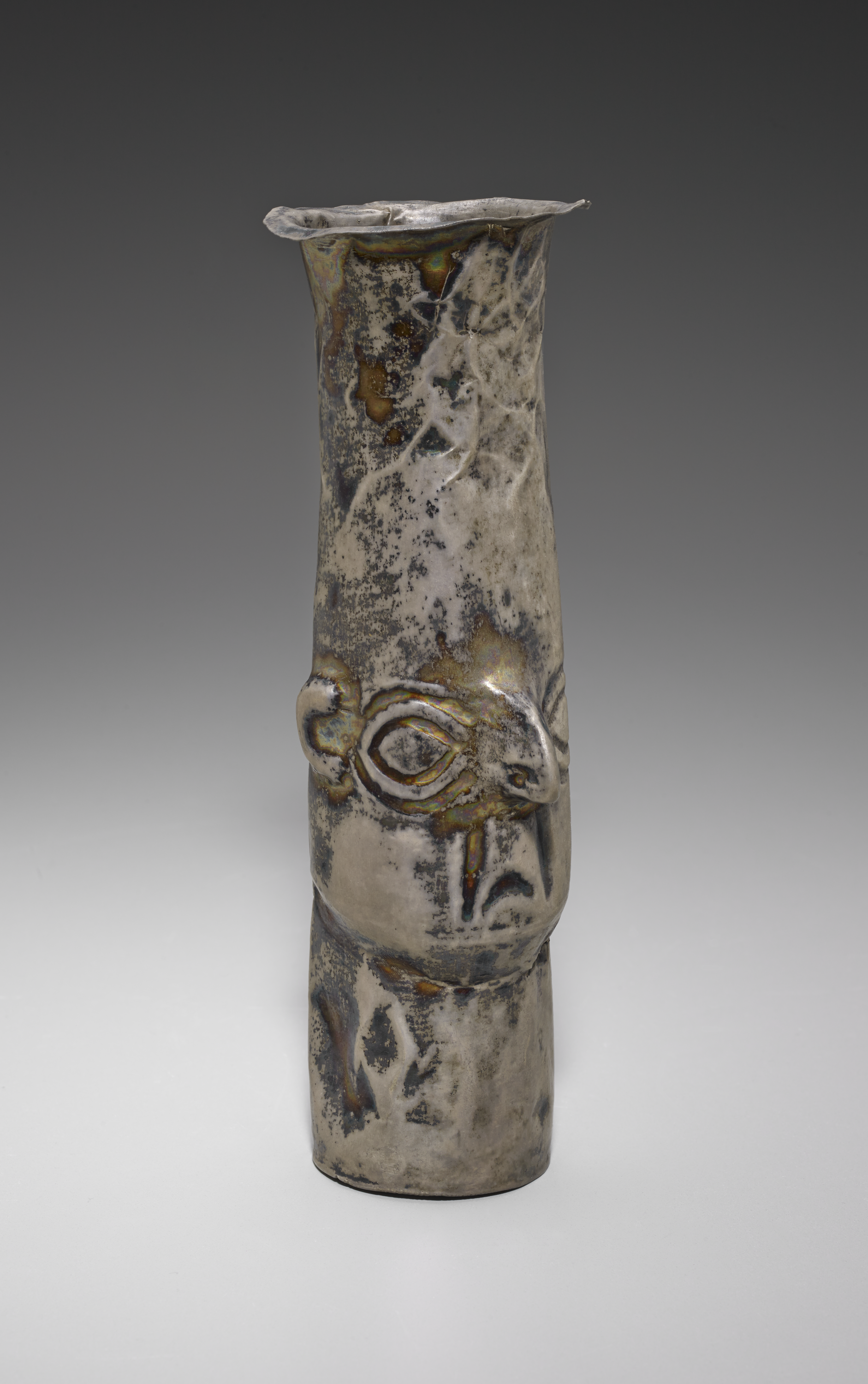
Chimú beaker with face, Central Andes, 1100–1536, made of hammered silver – Yale University Art Gallery

Metalworking picked up quickly in the Late Chimú periods. The Chimú worked with metals such as gold, silver, and copper. Some Chimú artisans worked in metal workshops divided into sections for each specialized treatment of metals: plating, gold, stamping, lost-wax, pearl, the watermark, and embossing wooden molds. These techniques produced large variety of objects, such as cups, knives, containers, figurines, bracelets, pins, and crowns. They used arsenic to harden the metals after they were cast. Large-scale smelting took place in a cluster of workshops at Cerro de los Cemetarios. The process starts with ore extracted from mines or a river, which is heated to very high temperatures and then cooled. The result is a group of prills, such as small round sections of copper, in a mass of slag, which are other materials which are not useful for metallurgy. The prills are then extracted by crushing the slag, and then melted together to form ingots, which were fashioned into various items. The Chimú also shaped metals through hammering, as displayed in the image on the right of the silver Chimú beaker. Chimú metalsmiths achieved this technique with simple tools and a single sheet of gold. The artist would first carve a wooden mold. Then they would carefully hammer the paper-thin sheet of gold around the wooden base.

Although copper is found naturally on the coast, it was mostly attained from the highlands in an area about 3 days away. Since most of the copper was imported, it is likely that most of the metal objects that were made were likely very small. The pieces, such as wires, needles, digging stick points, tweezers, and personal ornaments, are consistently small, utilitarian objects of copper or copper bronze. The Tumi is one well-known Chimú work. They also made beautiful ritual costumes of gold compounds with plume headdresses, earrings, necklaces, bracelets, and breastplates.

== Religion ==
=== Deities ===
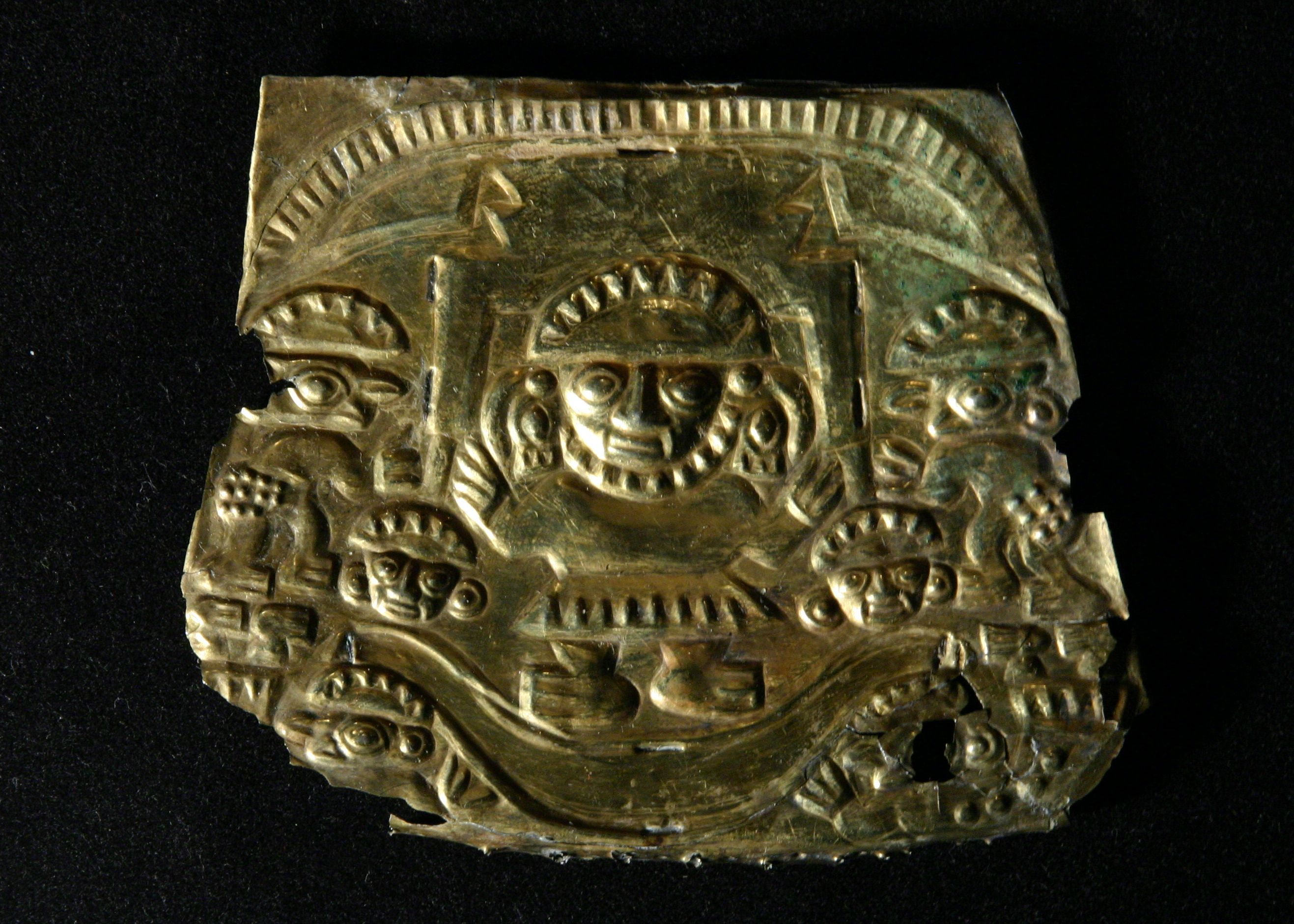
Chimú gold plaque, displays god Naymlap on his boat – Lombards Historical Society Museum

In Pacasmayo, the Moon deity (Si or Shi) was the greatest divinity. It was believed to be more powerful than the Sun, as it appeared by night and day, and it also controlled the weather and growth of crops. Devotees sacrificed animals and birds to the Moon, as well as their own children on piles of colored cottons with offerings of fruit and chicha. They believed the sacrificed children would become deified and they were usually sacrificed around age five.

The Chimú worshipped Mars (Nor) and Earth (Ghisa) deities, as well as the Sun (Jiang) and the Sea (Ni) deities. Jiang was associated with stones called alaec-pong (cacique stone), which were believed to be ancestors of the people in whose area they stood and sons of the Sun. The Chimú made offerings of maize flour of red ochre to Ni for protection against drowning and bountiful catches of fish.

Several constellations were also viewed as important. Two of the stars of Orion's Belt were considered to be the emissaries of the Moon. The constellation Fur (the Pleiades) was used to calculate the year and was believed to watch over the crops.

Each district had local shrines that varied in importance. These shrines, called huacas, were also found in other parts of Peru, and had a sacred object of worship (macyaec) with an associated legend and cult.

=== Sacrifice ===
In 1997, members of an archaeological team discovered approximately 200 skeletal remains on the beach at Punta Lobos, Peru. These figures were blindfolded and had their hands bound behind their backs, their feet bound together, and their throats slashed. Archaeologists suggest these figures, likely bodies of fishermen, may have been killed as a sign of gratitude to the sea god Ni after they conquered the fishermen's fertile seaside valley in 1350 A.D.

Tombs in the Huaca of the Moon belonged to six or seven teenagers from 13–14 years of age. Nine tombs belonged to children.

In 2011, archaeologists uncovered human and animal skeletons in the village of Huanchaco. After years of excavation, they identified more than 140 human (and more than 200 llama) skeletons from children between the ages of 6 and 15, all of whom had deep slashes across the sternum and broken rib cages indicating that their hearts may have been removed. According to National Geographic, if the analysis is correct, the discovery constitutes "the largest single mass child sacrifice event known in world history". The burial is dated at 1400–1450. Anthropologist Haagen Klaus speculates that Chimú might have turned to children when the sacrifice of adults was not enough to stop torrential rain and flooding caused by El Niño. In August 2019 the archaeological team working at this site revealed that the bodies of 227 victims, aged between four and 14, had been excavated, further establishing this as the largest-ever known example of child sacrifice.

== Architecture ==
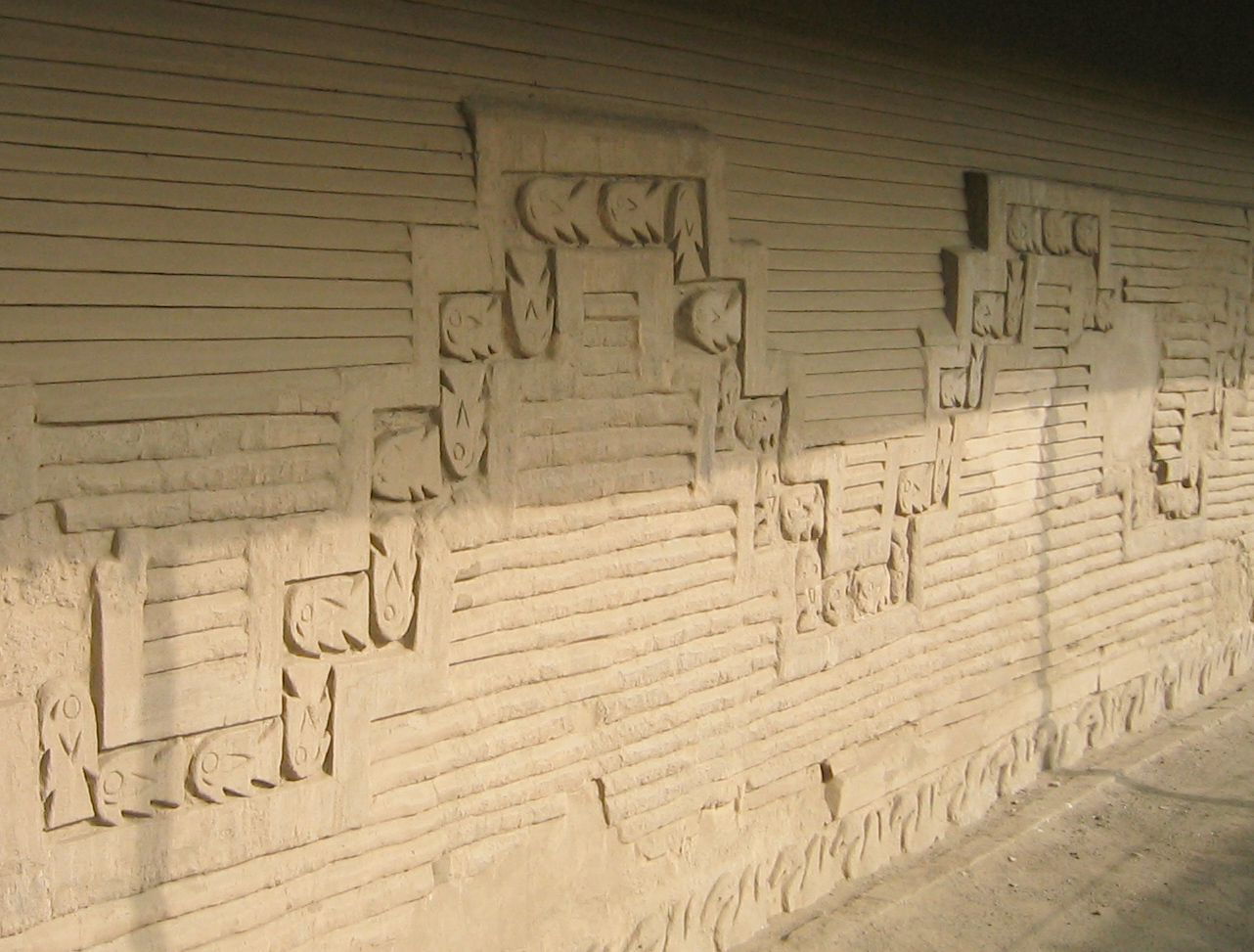
Carvings of fish in the Tschudi Complex, Chan Chan

Differential architecture of palaces and monumental sites distinguished the rulers from the common people. At Chan Chan, there are ten large, walled enclosures called ciudadelas, or royal compounds, thought to be associated with the kings of Chimor. They are surrounded by adobe walls that are nine meters high, giving the ciudadela the appearance of a fortress.

The bulk of the Chimú population (approximately 26,000 people) lived in barrios on the outer edge of the city. They consisted of many single-family domestic spaces with a kitchen, work space, domestic animals, and storage area.

Ciudadelas frequently have U-shaped rooms that consist of three walls, a raised floor, and frequently, a courtyard, and there were often as many as 15 in one palace. In the early Chimú period, the U-shaped areas were found in strategic places for controlling the flow of supplies from storerooms, but it is unlikely that they served as storage areas. They are described as mnemonic devices for keeping track of the distribution of supplies. Over time, the frequency of the U-shaped structures increased, and the distribution of the structures changed, becoming more grouped rather than dispersed and occurring further away from access routes to resources.

The architecture of the rural sites also supported the idea of a hierarchical social order. They have similar structural components, making them mini-ciudadelas with rural adapted administrative functions. Most of these sites have smaller walls, with many audiencias as the focal point of the structures. These would be used to restrict access to certain areas and are often found at strategic points.

Chan Chan shows a lack of a unifying plan or a discernible pattern. The urban core contains six principal classes of architecture:

1. Ten ciudadelas – citadels or palatial fortresses
2. Domestic architecture associated with Chan Chan's non-royal gentry
3. Artisan-class dwellings and workshops spread throughout the city
4. Four huacas or temple mounds
5. U-shaped audiencias or courts
6. SIAR or small irregular agglutinated rooms, which probably served as the residences for the majority of the population

== See also ==
- Chimor–Inca War
- List of rulers of Chimor
- Moche
- Chan Chan
- Huanchaco
- Swamps of Huanchaco

== Sources ==
- Costin, Cathy Lynne (2016). Making Value, Making Meaning – Techné in the Pre-Columbian World. Dumbarton Oaks Research Library and Collection. pp. 221–252. ISBN 9780884024156.
- "Earspools". carlos.emory.edu. Archived from the original on 13 April 2018.
- Glowacki, Mary (2005). "Food of the Gods or mere mortals? Hallucinogenic Spondylus and its interpretive implications for early Andean society". Antiquity. 79 (304): 257–268. doi:10.1017/s0003598x00114061. ISSN 0003-598X. S2CID 160047859.
- Martin, Alexander J. (2001). "The Dynamics of Pre-Columbian Spondylus Trade across the South American Central Pacific Coast". Florida Atlantic University.
- Miller, Rebecca Stone (1996). Art of the Andes – From Chavín to Inca. Thames & Hudson. pp. 160–161. ISBN 978-0500202869.
- Park, Yumi (2012). Mirrors of Clay – Reflections of Ancient Andean Life in Ceramics from the Sam Olden Collection. University Press of Mississippi. pp. 91–92. ISBN 978-1617037955.
- Paulsen, Allison C. (1974). "The Thorny Oyster and the Voice of God – Spondylus and Strombus in Andean Prehistory". American Antiquity. 39 (4 Part 1): 597–607. doi:10.2307/278907. ISSN 0002-7316. JSTOR 278907. S2CID 163248896.
- Pillsbury, Joanne (1996). "The Thorny Oyster and the Origins of Empire – Implications of Recently Uncovered Spondylus Imagery from Chan Chan, Peru". Latin American Antiquity. 7 (4): 313–340. doi:10.2307/972262. ISSN 1045-6635. JSTOR 972262. S2CID 164108466.
- Ritual Sacrifice in Ancient Peru (1st ed.). University of Texas Press. 2001. ISBN 0292708939. OCLC 55873621.
- "Thorny Oysters – The Daughters of the Sea". The Metropolitan Museum of Art. 22 August 2016.
- Chimor outline
- Moore, J.D., Mackey, C.J. (2008), The Chimú Empire. In: Silverman, H., Isbell, W.H. (eds) The Handbook of South American Archaeology, Springer, New York, https://doi.org/10.1007/978-0-387-74907-5_39
- Cutright, Robyn E.; "Eating Empire in the Jequetepeque – A Local View of Chimú Expansion on the North Coast of Peru", Latin American Antiquity, vol. 26, no. 1, 2015, pp. 64–86, https://doi.org/10.7183/1045-6635.26.1.64, Accessed 2022.
