= Severo Aparicio Quispe =

Peruvian friar and bishop

The Right Rev. Lord Brother Severo Aparicio Quispe, O. de M.
- Titular Bishop of Vegesela in Numidia
- Church: Roman Catholic Church
- See: Titular See of Vegesela in Numidia
- In office: 1978–2013
- Predecessor: Moacyr Grechi, O.S.M.
- Previous post: Auxiliary Bishop of the Archdiocese of Cuzco (1978–1999)

Orders
- Ordination: September 22, 1951
- Consecration: 4 March 1979 by Cardinal Juan Landázuri Ricketts, O.F.M.

Personal details
- Born: October 8, 1923 San Pedro de Lloc, Pacasmayo, Peru
- Died: May 6, 2013 (aged 89) Cuzco, Peru

Severo Aparicio Quispe, O. de M., (October 8, 1923 – May 6, 2013) was a Peruvian friar of the Mercedarian Order who was made a bishop of the Catholic Church. He wrote a number of works on the history of the Catholic Church and of his Order in Peru.

== Life ==
Aparicio was born in San Pedro de Lloc, Pacasmayo, and later entered the Mercedarian friars. He was ordained a priest on September 22, 1951.

Aparicio was appointed an auxiliary bishop for the Archdiocese of Cuzco as well as titular bishop of Vegesela in Numidia on December 11, 1978. He was consecrated a bishop on March 4, 1979 by Cardinal Juan Landázuri Ricketts, O.F.M.

Aparicio retired as an auxiliary bishop on April 10, 1999, upon reaching the mandatory retirement age of 75. He then took residence at the Mercedarian monastery in the city. He died on May 6, 2013, and was buried in the crypt of the cathedral.

== Publications ==
- Los mercedarios en los concilios limenses, 1973
- Valores humanos y religiosos del Inca Garcilaso de la Vega, 1989
- Los Mercedarios en la Universidad de San Marcos de Lima, 1999
- Homenaje al R.P. doctor Antonio San Cristóbal Sebastián, Universidad Nacional de San Agustín 2000
- El clero y la rebelión de Túpac Amaru, Band 1 von Colección Pachatusan 2000
- La orden de la Merced en el Perú: estudos históricos, Band 2, Provincia Mercedaria del Perú 2001
- José Pérez Armendáriz: obispo del Cuzco y precursor de la independencia del Peru, Band 3 von Colección Pachatusan 2002
- Siete obispos cuzqueños de la colonia, Band 2 von Colección Pachatusan 2002 ()
- Siervo de Dios P. Francisco Salamanca, Band 4 von Colección Pachatusan 2006
- El arzobispo Goyoneche ante las dificultades de la iglesia del Perú antes las dificultades de la Iglesia del Perú, 1816-1872, 2006 ()

== See also ==
- Roman Catholic Archdiocese of Cuzco
- Order of the Blessed Virgin Mary of Mercy
