= San Pedro de Lloc District =

Coordinates: 7°25′35.68″S 79°30′14.15″W

San Pedro de Lloc
- District
- Interactive map of San Pedro de Lloc
- Country: Peru
- Region: La Libertad
- Province: Pacasmayo
- Capital: San Pedro de Lloc

Government
  - Mayor: Wilfredo De La Cruz Rodriguez Razuri

Area
  - Total: 698.42 km^{2} (269.66 sq mi)
- Elevation: 43 m (141 ft)

Population (2005 census)
  - Total: 16,426
  - Density: 23.519/km^{2} (60.913/sq mi)
- Time zone: UTC-5 (PET)
- UBIGEO: 130701

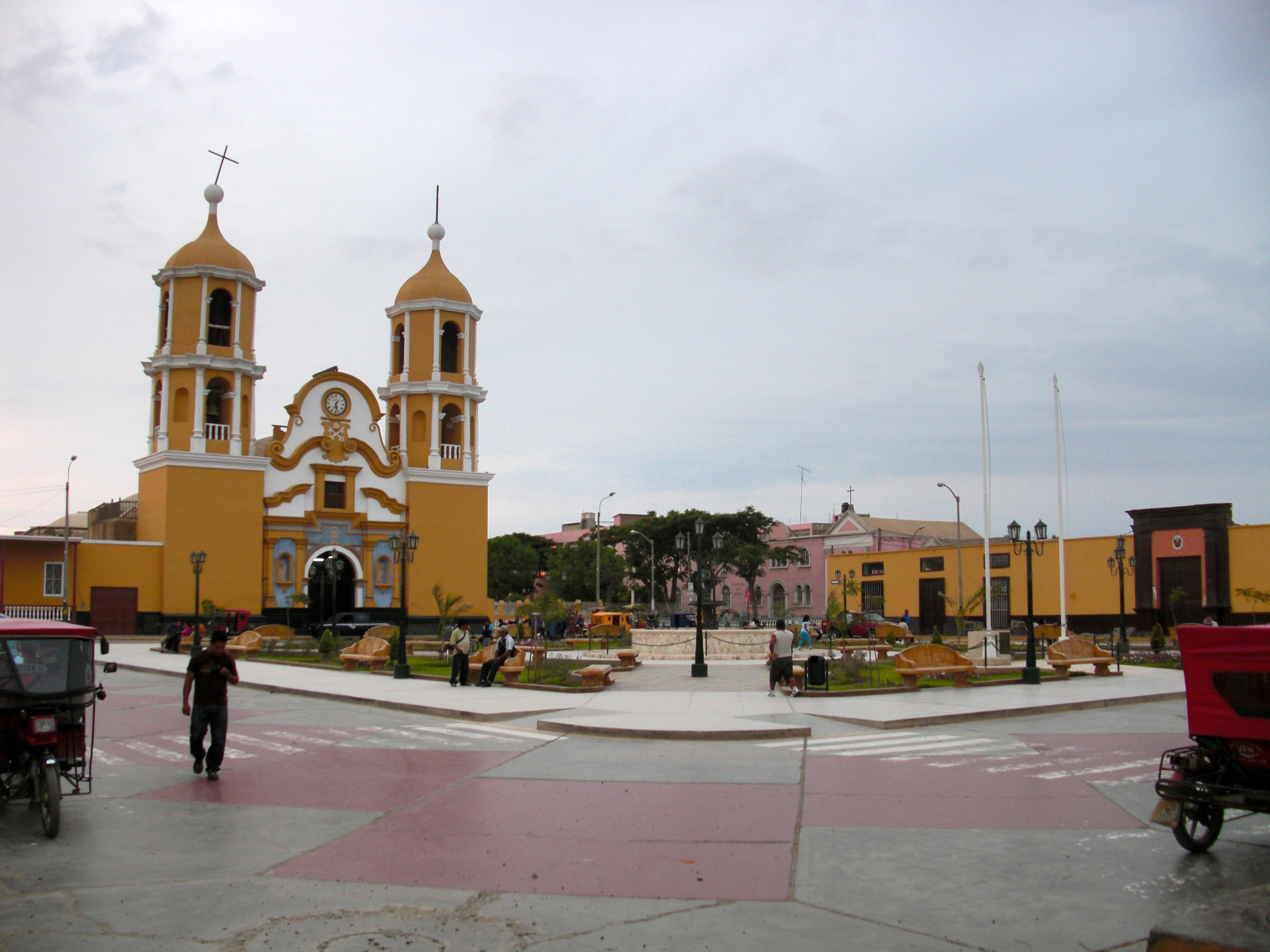
San Pedro de Lloc - Main Plaza

San Pedro de Lloc District is one of five districts of the province Pacasmayo in Peru.

== Localities ==
Some localities en San Pedro de Lloc district are:

- Puémape
- Masanca
- Chocofán
