= List of rulers of Chimor =

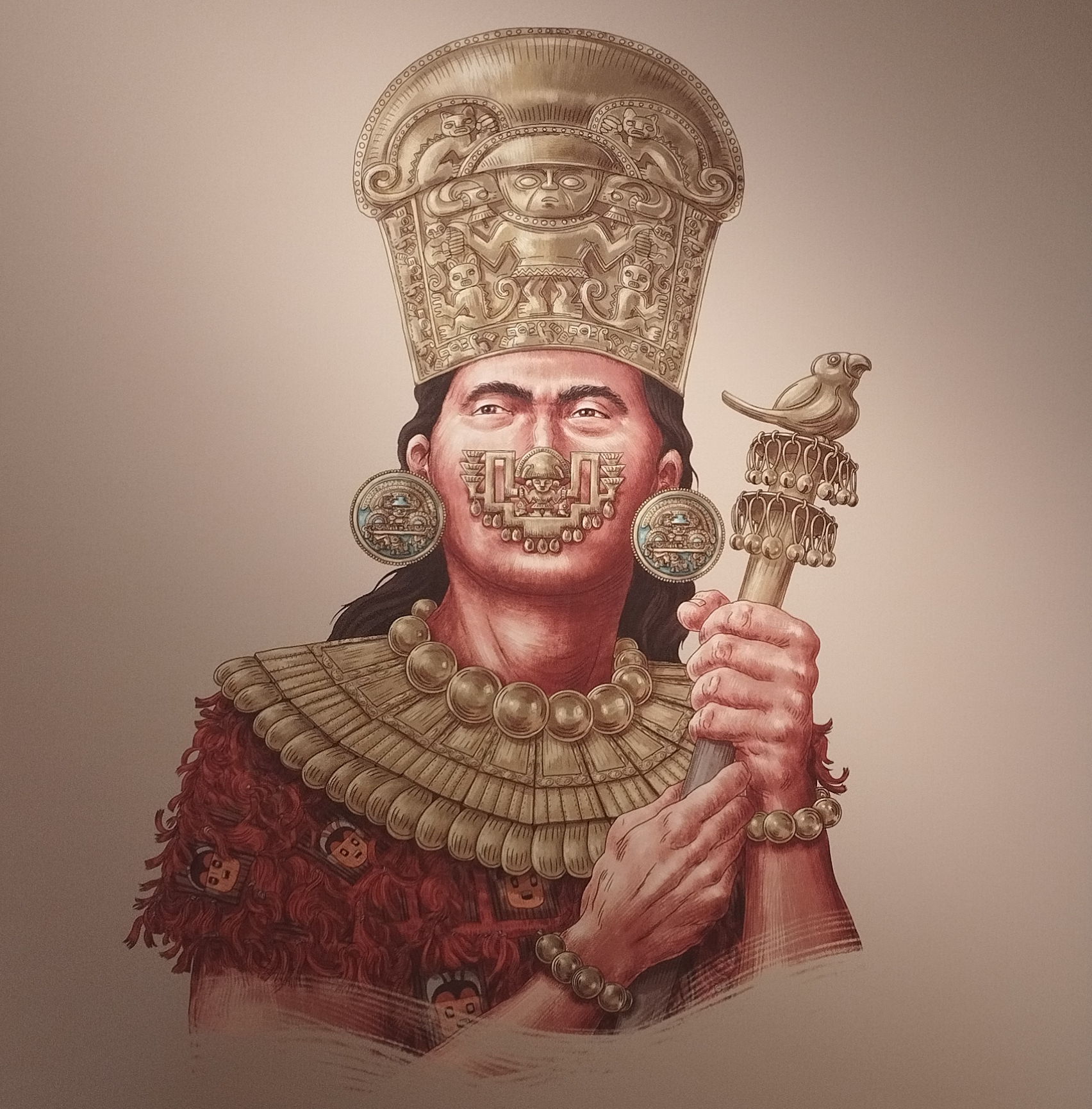
A modern representation of Minchançaman from the National Museum of Peru.

The Kingdom of Chimor was a largely Quingnam-speaking polity during the Andean Late Intermediate Period in Peru, centered on the capital of Chan Chan. It would eventually be conquered by an expansionist Inca Empire. Its monarchs or kings were known as the Chimor Cápac. Known rulers of Chimor are largely extrapolated from the Relación de Taycanamo by Rubén Vargas Ugarte, with much of its information from the Historia Suscinta de los Chimú.

== Taycanamo Dynasty ==
Monarch Name	Reign	Comments
Taycanamo	c.1305 or c.1275-1310	Only known from Historia Suscinta de los Chimú, a Spanish chronicle from 1604. Founder and First ruler of the Chimú Kingdom. Apparently he took up both political and religious powers. The Chronicle says "He came from the sea, it is not known from where, in a fleet of rafts, with all of his court and warriors." He is the presumed founder of the capital Chan Chan.
Wakri Kaur	c. 1340 or c.1310-1345	Hispanicized as Guacricaur. Son of Taycanamo. Only known from Historia Suscinta de los Chimú. The Chronicle says he "acquired greater powers than his father, controlling the Indians and the Chiefs of the Valley."
Ñancempinco	c. 1375 or c. 1345–1380	Son of Wakri Kaur. Only known from Historia Suscinta de los Chimú. The chronicle mentions he expanded the Kingdom's territory to Mayao (Santa) in the South and Pacamayo in the North.
Fourth Ruler (Name Unknown)	c. 1380–1390	The Historia Suscinta de los Chimú does not mention names of the intermediate rulers. It does mention that after Wakri Kaur, seven caciques succeeded him before Minchançaman. (The first of these seven being Ñancempinco)
Fifth Ruler (Name Unknown)	c. 1390–1400	The Historia Suscinta de los Chimú does not mention names of the intermediate rulers. It does mention that after Wakri Kaur, seven caciques succeeded him before Minchançaman. (The first of these seven being Ñancempinco)
Sixth Ruler (Name Unknown)	c. 1400–1415	The Historia Suscinta de los Chimú does not mention names of the intermediate rulers. It does mention that after Wakri Kaur, seven caciques succeeded him before Minchançaman. (The first of these seven being Ñancempinco)
Seventh Ruler (Name Unknown)	c. 1415–1430	The Historia Suscinta de los Chimú does not mention names of the intermediate rulers. It does mention that after Wakri Kaur, seven caciques succeeded him before Minchançaman. (The first of these seven being Ñancempinco)
Eighth Ruler (Name Unknown)	c. 1430–1440	The Historia Suscinta de los Chimú does not mention names of the intermediate rulers. It does mention that after Wakri Kaur, seven caciques succeeded him before Minchançaman. (The first of these seven being Ñancempinco)
Ninth Ruler (Name Unknown)	c. 1440–1450	The Historia Suscinta de los Chimú does not mention names of the intermediate rulers. It does mention that after Wakri Kaur, seven caciques succeeded him before Minchançaman. (The first of these seven being Ñancempinco)
Minchançaman	c. 1450–1470	The final independent ruler of Chimor. Well attested from numerous sources. According to the Spanish chronicle from 1604, the tenth ruler of the Chimú Kingdom, and a descendent the previous ones. Was defeated by Topa Inca Yupanqui in the Chimor–Inca War and his kingdom absorbed by the growing Inca Empire. After being deposed, lived the rest of his life as a hostage in Cusco.

== Puppet Rulers under Inca Dominion ==
Monarch Name	Comments
Chumun Caur	The son of Minchançaman and Chanquirguanguan, a noblewoman from the Huaura River Valley. Put in place as an Inca puppet ruler after the deposition of his father. Married a different Chanquirguanguan, who was a daughter of Pachacuti or Topa Inca Yupanqui
Huaman Chumo	Son of Chumun Caur and the Incan Princess Chanquirguanguan. A rebellion occurred in Chan Chan while Huayna Capac was Sapa Inca, and in the aftermath Huaman Chumo was banished from Chan Chan. His children were Ancocoyuch, Caja Cimcim, Calli, and Chambinamo.
Ancocoyuch	Son of Huaman Chumo. Was killed by Atahualpa for supporting Huáscar in the Inca Civil War.
Caja Cimcim	Brother of Ancocoyuch. Converted to Christianity and took the name "Martín"

== Vassals under Spanish Dominion ==
The last documented indigenous ruler of the Moche Valley, a descendant of the Tacaynamo Dynsty, was Don Antonio Chayguar in the early seventeenth century. Five unnamed caciques ruled between Caja Cimcim and Antonio Chaygua.
