= Jequetepeque District =

Coordinates: 7.4167°S 79.5000°W

Jequetepeque
- District
- Interactive map of Jequetepeque
- Country: Peru
- Region: La Libertad
- Province: Pacasmayo
- Capital: Jequetepeque

Government
  - Mayor: Oscar Luperio Honorio Horna

Area
  - Total: 50.98 km^{2} (19.68 sq mi)
- Elevation: 20 m (66 ft)

Population (2005 census)
  - Total: 3,338
  - Density: 65.48/km^{2} (169.6/sq mi)
- Time zone: UTC-5 (PET)
- UBIGEO: 130703

Jequetepeque District is one of five districts of the province Pacasmayo in Peru.
