= Guadalupe District, Pacasmayo =

Coordinates: 7.4167°S 79.5000°W

Guadalupe
- District
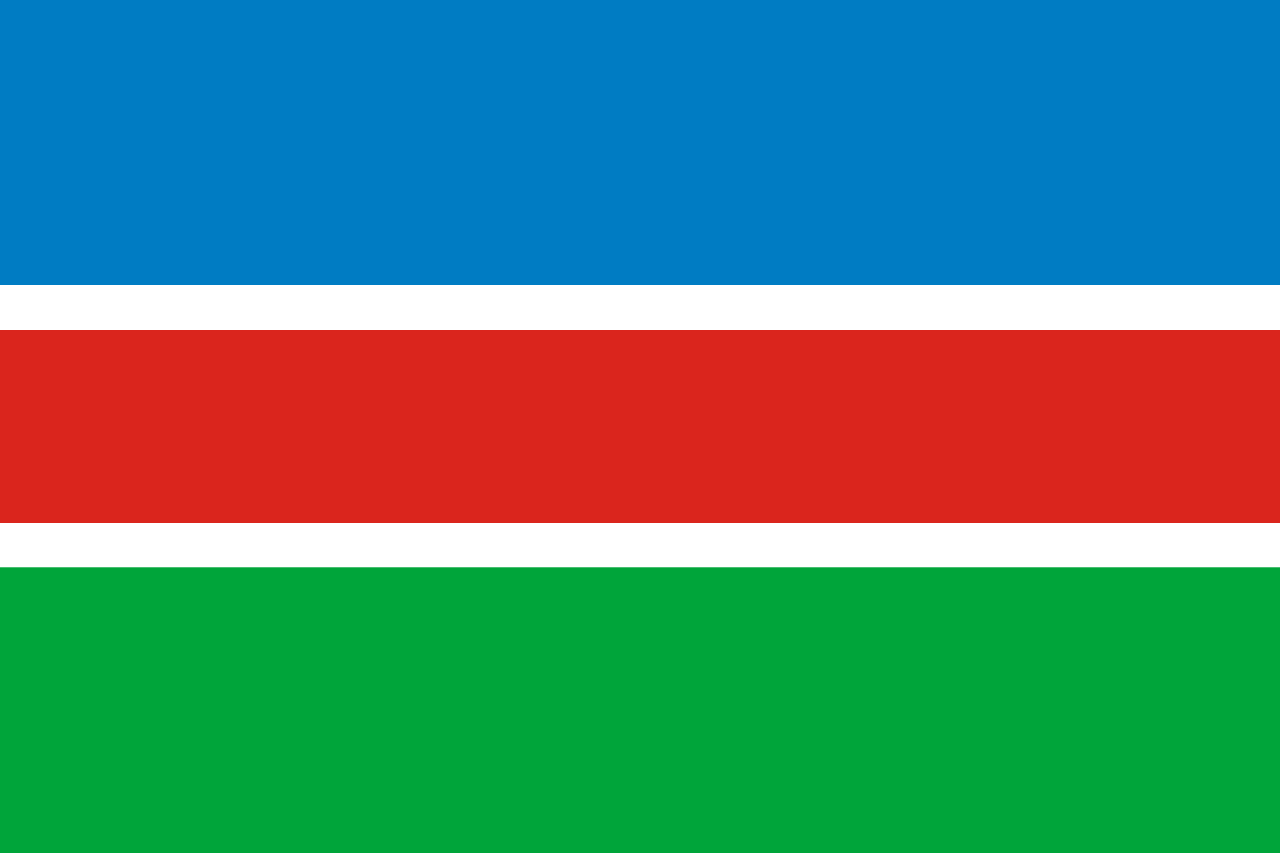
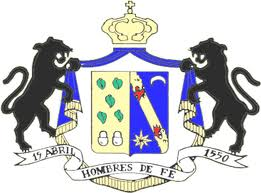
- Flag Coat of arms
- Interactive map of Guadalupe
- Country: Peru
- Region: La Libertad
- Province: Pacasmayo
- Capital: Guadalupe

Government
  - Mayor: Benjamín Javier Banda Abanto

Area
  - Total: 165.37 km^{2} (63.85 sq mi)
- Elevation: 92 m (302 ft)

Population (2017)
  - Total: 40,217
  - Density: 243.19/km^{2} (629.87/sq mi)
- Time zone: UTC-5 (PET)
- UBIGEO: 130702

Guadalupe District is one of five districts of the province Pacasmayo in Peru.

== Localities ==
Some localities in Guadalupe district are the following:

- Ciudad de Dios
- Limoncarro
- Faclo

== Climate ==
Climate data for Talla, Guadalupe, elevation 117 m (384 ft), (1991–2020)
Month	Jan	Feb	Mar	Apr	May	Jun	Jul	Aug	Sep	Oct	Nov	Dec	Year
Mean daily maximum °C (°F)	29.5 (85.1)	30.2 (86.4)	30.3 (86.5)	29.4 (84.9)	27.8 (82.0)	25.8 (78.4)	24.9 (76.8)	24.8 (76.6)	25.6 (78.1)	26.3 (79.3)	26.9 (80.4)	28.2 (82.8)	27.5 (81.4)
Mean daily minimum °C (°F)	20.2 (68.4)	21.2 (70.2)	20.8 (69.4)	19.1 (66.4)	17.3 (63.1)	15.6 (60.1)	14.4 (57.9)	14.2 (57.6)	14.7 (58.5)	15.4 (59.7)	16.1 (61.0)	18.3 (64.9)	17.3 (63.1)
Average precipitation mm (inches)	6.5 (0.26)	14.2 (0.56)	17.6 (0.69)	3.5 (0.14)	0.9 (0.04)	0.2 (0.01)	0.0 (0.0)	0.2 (0.01)	0.4 (0.02)	1.4 (0.06)	1.3 (0.05)	4.9 (0.19)	51.1 (2.03)
Source: National Meteorology and Hydrology Service of Peru
