= San José District, Pacasmayo =

Coordinates: 7.4167°S 79.5000°W

San José
- District
- Interactive map of San José
- Country: Peru
- Region: La Libertad
- Province: Pacasmayo
- Founded: January 2, 1857
- Capital: San José

Government
  - Mayor: Cesar A. Cesar Chavez Paz

Area
  - Total: 181.06 km^{2} (69.91 sq mi)
- Elevation: 104 m (341 ft)

Population (2005 census)
  - Total: 11,504
  - Density: 63.537/km^{2} (164.56/sq mi)
- Time zone: UTC-5 (PET)
- UBIGEO: 130705

San José District is one of five districts of the province Pacasmayo in Peru.

== Localities ==
Some localities in San José district are:

- Cultambo
- Cosque
- Cruce de San José
