= San José de Pacasmayo =

- Town
- Location within Peru
- Coordinates: 7°20′58.70″S 79°27′16.51″W
- Country: Peru
- Region: La Libertad
- Province: Pacasmayo
- District: San José
- Time zone: UTC-5 (PET)

San José de Pacasmayo is a town in Northern Peru, capital of the district San José in the region La Libertad. This town is located some 115 km north Trujillo city and is an agricultural center in the Jequetepeque Valley.

== See also ==
- Jequetepeque Valley
- Pacasmayo
- Chepén
