= Pacasmayo province =

Coordinates: 7°25′40″S 79°30′13″W

Pacasmayo
- Province
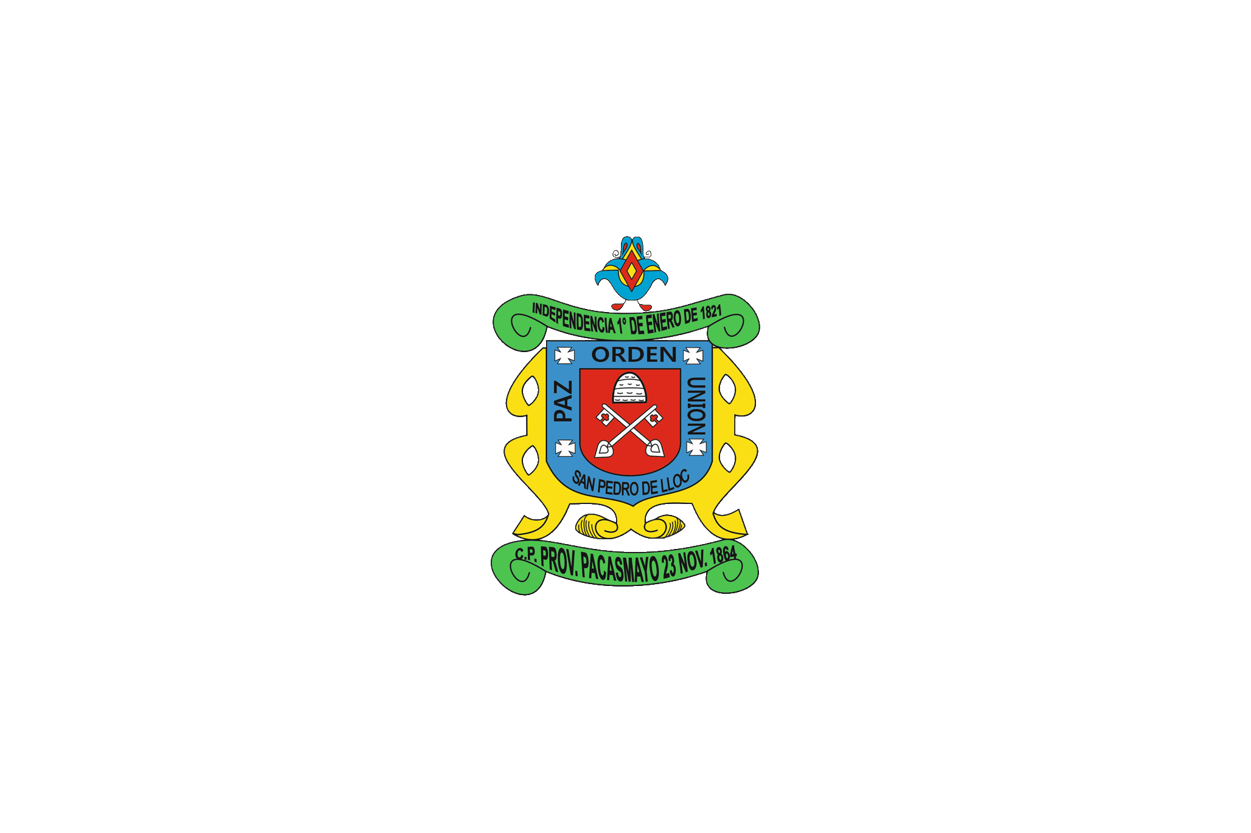
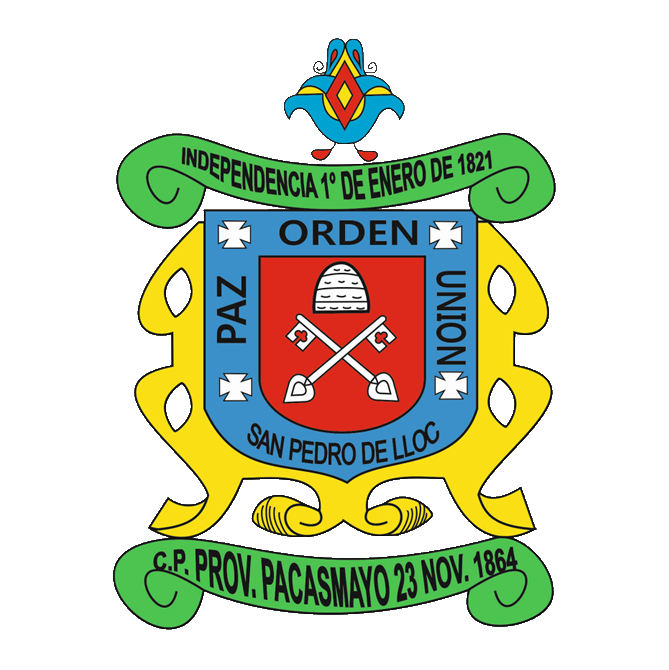
- Flag Coat of arms

- Location of Pacasmayo in La Libertad Region
- Interactive map of Pacasmayo
- Country: Peru
- Region: La Libertad
- Founded: 23 November 1864
- Capital: San Pedro de Lloc

Government
  - Mayor: Victor Raúl Cruzado Rivera

Area
  - Total: 1,126.67 km^{2} (435.01 sq mi)

Population
  - Total: 102,897
  - Density: 91.3284/km^{2} (236.540/sq mi)
- UBIGEO: 1307

Pacasmayo is one of twelve provinces of the La Libertad Region in Peru; Pacasmayo is also the name of one of its districts. The capital of this province is the city of San Pedro de Lloc.

== Political division ==
The province is divided into five districts, which are:

Nº.	District	Population Cens. 2007	Capital	Mayor
1°	Guadalupe	---	Guadalupe	---
2°	Jequetepeque	---	Jequetepeque	---
3°	Pacasmayo	---	Pacasmayo	
4°	San José	---	San José	---
5°	San Pedro de Lloc	---	San Pedro de Lloc	---

== See also ==
- La Libertad Region
- Chepen province
- Ascope province
