= Latin American Antiquity =

Journal

- Discipline: Archaeology, Mesoamerican studies
- Language: English; Spanish
- Edited by: Geoffrey E. Braswell, María A. Gutiérrez

Publication details
- History: 1990–present
- Publisher: Cambridge University Press

Standard abbreviations
- ISO 4: Lat. Am. Antiq.

Indexing
- ISSN: 1045-6635 (print); 2325-5080 (web)
- JSTOR: latiameranti

Links
- Journal homepage

Latin American Antiquity is a professional journal published by the Society for American Archaeology, the largest organization of professional archaeologists of the Americas in the world. Published since 1990 as a sister journal to American Antiquity, it is considered the flagship professional journal of Latin American archaeology, focusing on the archaeology of cultures in Mexico, Central America, the Caribbean, and South America. The journal includes articles in historical archaeology.
