= American Antiquity =

Peer-reviewed academic journal

- Discipline: Archaeology
- Language: English
- Edited by: Debra Martin

Publication details
- History: 1935–present
- Publisher: Cambridge University Press for the Society for American Archaeology (United States)
- Frequency: Quarterly
- Impact factor: 3.129 (2020)

Standard abbreviations
- ISO 4: Am. Antiq.

Indexing
- ISSN: 0002-7316
- JSTOR: 00027316

Links
- Journal homepage

American Antiquity is a professional journal published by Cambridge University Press for the Society for American Archaeology, an organization of professional archaeologists of the Americas. The journal is considered to be the flagship journal of American archaeology.

American Antiquity is a quarterly, peer-reviewed journal published in January, April, July and October. Each copy of the journal has about 200 pages, with articles covering topics such as archaeological method, archaeological science, pre-Columbian societies or civilizations, ongoing work at archaeological sites, and interim reports of excavations. The journal also includes book reviews, editorials, and comments and responses on previous articles.

American Antiquity has been in publication since 1935. Since the publication of the first issue of the related journal Latin American Antiquity in 1990, American Antiquity articles and excavation reports rarely cover work done in Latin American countries.
