= Jequetepeque =

- Town
- Location within Peru
- Coordinates: 7°20′15.77″S 79°33′47.86″W
- Country: Peru
- Region: La Libertad
- Province: Pacasmayo
- District: Jequetepeque
- Time zone: UTC-5 (PET)

Jequetepeque is a town in Northern Peru, capital of the district Jequetepeque in Pacasmayo Province of La Libertad Region. This town is located some 117 km north Trujillo city and is primarily an agricultural center in the Jequetepeque Valley.

In 2023, a group of Peruvian archeologists discovered a Wari cemetery in the middle Jequetepeque Valley. The cemetery, which encompasses two burial chambers, covers 24 hectares. Peru's Ministry of Culture released a statement saying that the discovery aligned with the Middle Horizon period, dating around 800 – 1000 AD.

== Nearby cities ==
- Chepén
- Guadalupe
- Pacasmayo

== See also ==
- Jequetepeque Valley
- Pacasmayo
- Chepén
