= San Pedro de Lloc =

- City
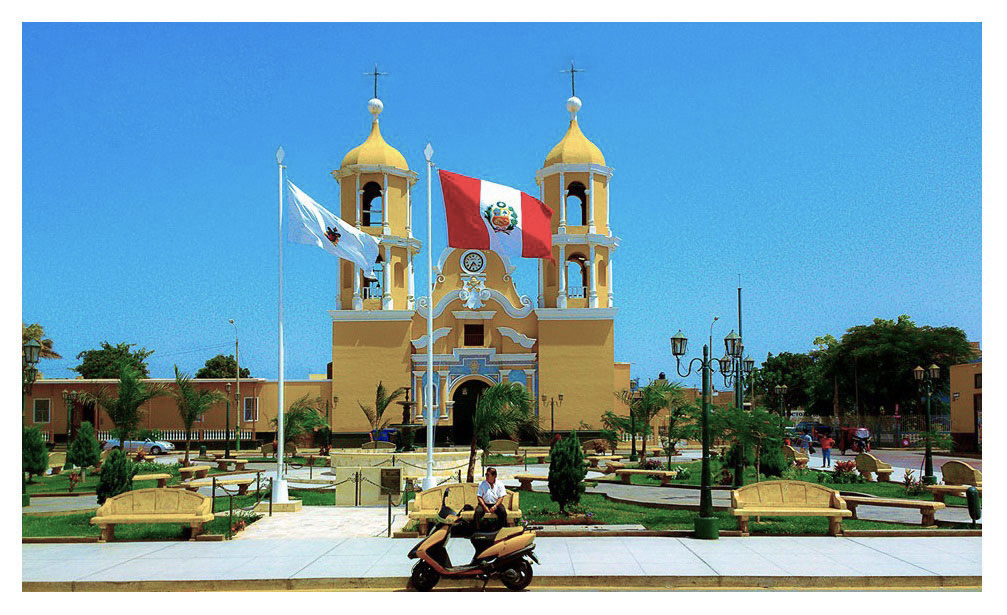
- Plaza de Armas of San Pedro de Lloc

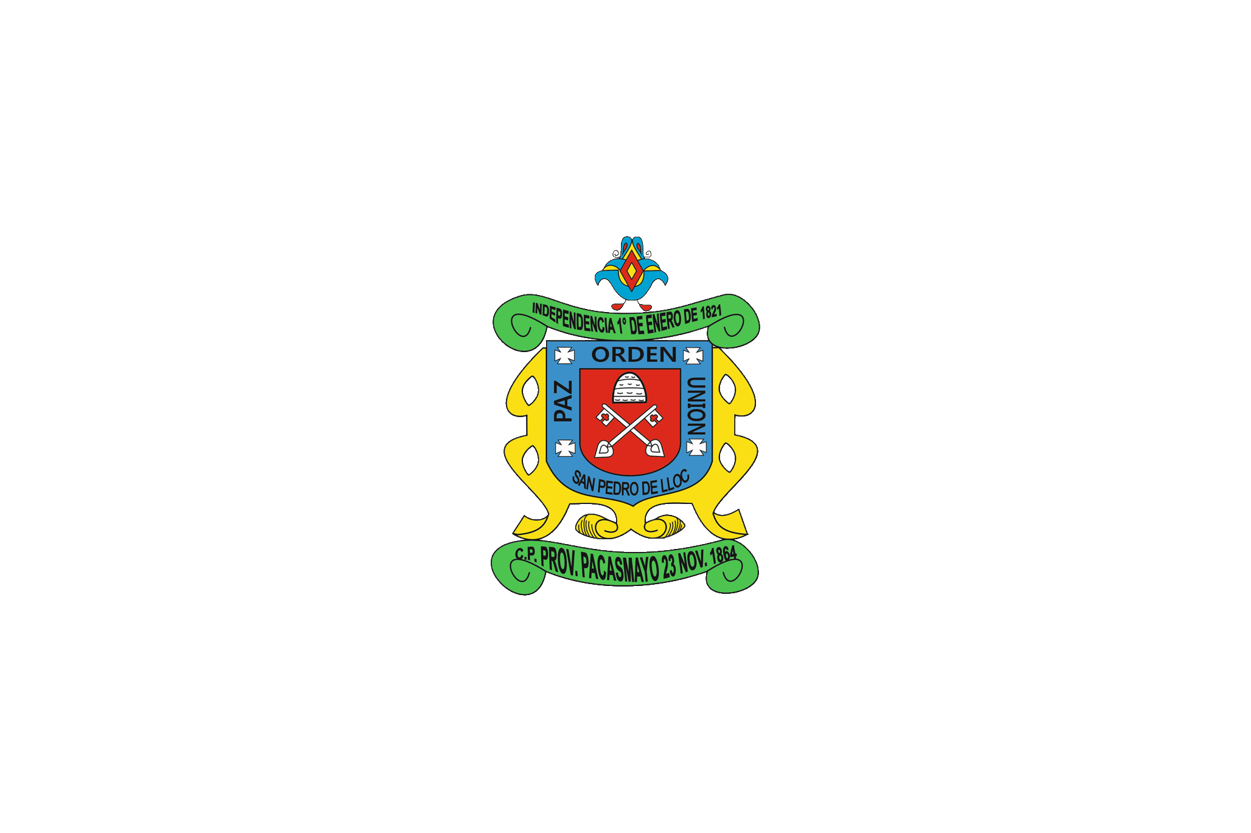
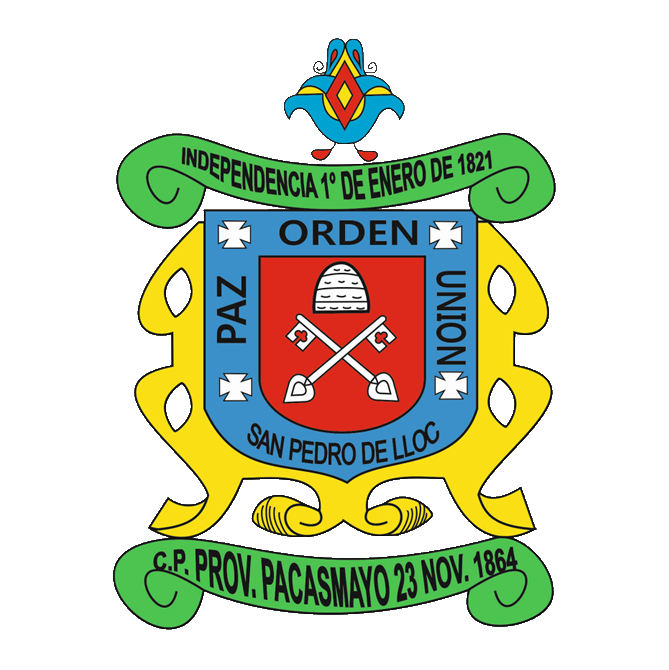
- Flag Seal

- Location within Peru
- Coordinates: 7°25′S 79°30′W
- Country: Peru
- Region: La Libertad
- Province: Pacasmayo

Government
  - Mayor: Victor Raúl Cruzado Rivera

Area
  - Total: 698.42 km^{2} (269.66 sq mi)
- Elevation: 43 m (141 ft)

Population (2017)
  - Total: 17,637
  - Density: 25.253/km^{2} (65.404/sq mi)
- Demonym: Sanpedrino/a
- Time zone: UTC-5 (PET)
- Website: Official Website

San Pedro de Lloc is a town in the La Libertad Region of northern Peru. It is the capital of the coastal Pacasmayo Province. It is located about 99 km north of the city of Trujillo.

It is known for its main Catholic church, Iglesia Matriz De San Pedro De Lloc, located on the Plaza de Armas. The Church is considered part of the patrimony of Peru.

San Pedro de Lloc is also known to be the last place of residence of the Italian-born scientist Antonio Raimondi. His home is located within a block of the main plaza and is open to the public as a museum.

== History ==
In the pre-Columbian period, the territory of the city belonged to the territory of the great Chimú culture. During the colony it belonged to the village of Saña, in the republican era it belonged to the province of Lambayeque until March 22, 1839, for economic reasons (collection of contributions) Agustín Gamarra formed the province of Chiclayo in which was included the district of San Pedro de Lloc, being its capital, the city of Chiclayo.

== Notable people ==
- Jose Andres Rázuri Esteves, Peruvian hero of the independence war.
- Akemi Giura Guanilo, Miss Peru La Libertad 2012.

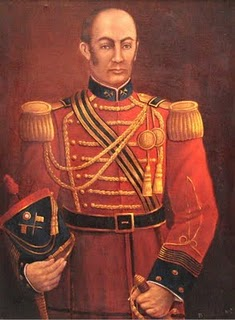
Portrait of the hero Jose Andres Rázuri Esteves

== See also ==
- Pacasmayo Province
- Chepén Province
