= Chimor–Inca War =

15th century conflict between Inca and Chimor empires

Chimor-Inca War
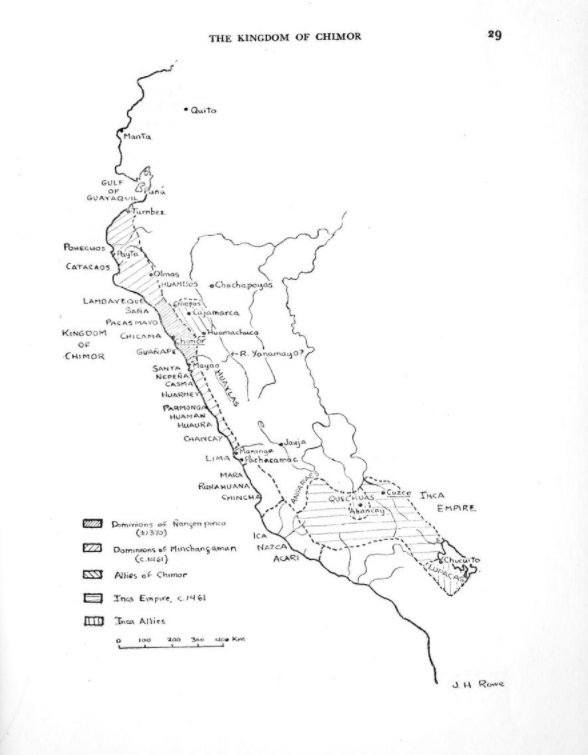
- Map showing the location of the Chimor and Inca empires with their respective allies.
Date	~1470
Location	Central and Northwestern Peru
Result	Inca victory; Chimor Empire ceases to exist and incorporated to Chinchaysuyo.; 60% of Chan Chan was destroyed.; Minchacaman is captured in Chan Chan and taken to Cuzco
Territorial changes	Annexation of the vast Chimú Empire and establishment of Chinchaysuyo

Belligerents
Chimor Empire; Cajamarca kingdom	Tawantinsuyu

Commanders and leaders
Minchancaman (surrendered); Querrotumi †	Pachacútec; Túpac Inca Yupanqui; Capac Yupanqui; Awki Yupanqui; Tilca Yupanqui

Strength
40,000-250,000 warriors	30,000-100,000 warriors

Casualties and losses
35,000–230,000 killed 5,000–20,000 captured or enslaved	?

The Chimor-Inca War was a conflict fought in the late 15th century between the Inca Empire and the Chimor Empire of coastal Peru. At the time of the conflict, the Chimor Empire was in a process of territorial expansion, but as the Inca Empire appeared in the picture, it became impossible for the Chimor to consolidate its conquests. Early skirmishes occurred when the Inca Empire conquered the non-Chimor inland city of Cajamarca. The Incas led by Topa Inca Yupanqui responded to hostilities by advancing first north to Quito in modern Ecuador and then turning their attention to the Chimor Empire. The Chimor Empire was likely conquered from the north. Once conquered, the Incas established an indirect rule over the Chimor. To consolidate victory the Incas pressured the Chimor to hand over the unruly Chimor cacique Minchançaman who travelled to Cuzco becoming a "luxury prisoner" while his more collaborative son acceded his position in his homeland.
