= PLANDET =

Urban planning agency of Trujillo

PLANDET (Urban Development Planning of Trujillo) is an agency of the Municipality of Trujillo in charge of urban development planning of the city, created by the Municipality of Trujillo with authority granted by the Organic Law of Municipalities, for the government of town. This agency specializes in urban planning support and it has specific functions on the territorial distribution of the city. It is responsible for developing planning documents such as the "Plan of comprehensive and sustainable development of Trujillo in 2015."

== History ==
Plandet before was called PLANDEMETRU (Metropolitan Development Plan of Trujillo). Currently this agency of the MUnicipality of Trujillo is working continuously in the planning of the urban development of Trujillo city.

== Functions ==
Among the main functions of Plandet are the following: To promote, develop, conduct, monitor and continuously assess and update the management and the execution of the Metropolitan Development Plan Trujillo and Local Plans de Desarrollo complementary, in coordination with relevant municipales.

== Documents published ==
- Metropolitan Development Plan of Trujillo 1995 - 2010.
- Plan of comprehensive and sustainable development of Trujillo in 2015.

== Related companies ==
- SEDALIB, company of water supply and sanitation in La Libertad Region.
- Caja Trujillo, company of banking.
- Municipality of Trujillo

== See also ==
- Historic Centre of Trujillo
- Chan Chan
- Huanchaco
- Puerto Chicama
- Chimu
- Pacasmayo beach
- Plaza de Armas of Trujillo
- Moche
- Víctor Larco Herrera District
- Vista Alegre
- Buenos Aires
- Las Delicias beach
- Independence of Trujillo
- Wall of Trujillo
- Santiago de Huamán
- Lake Conache
- Marinera Festival
- Trujillo Spring Festival
- Wetlands of Huanchaco
- Association of Breeders and Owners of Paso Horses in La Libertad
- Salaverry beach
- Puerto Morín
- Virú culture
- Marcahuamachuco
- Wiracochapampa
