= Municipality of Victor Larco Herrera =

Peruvian governing body

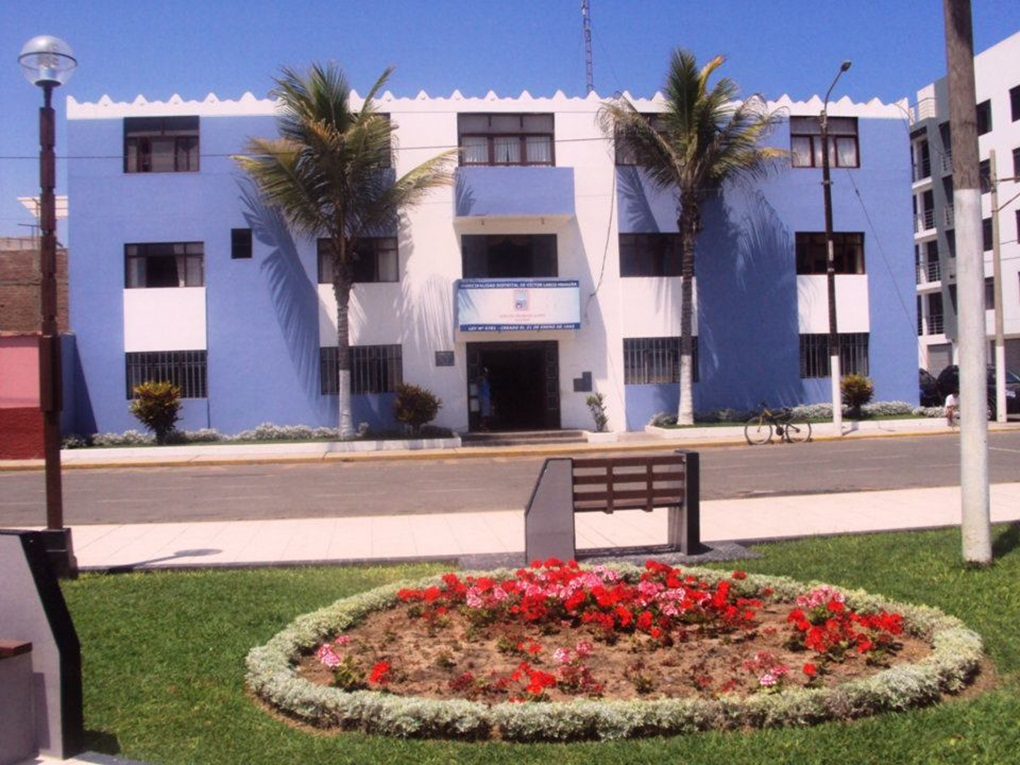
View of the Municipality of Víctor Larco Herrera in Buenos Aires

Municipality of Victor Larco Herrera is a Peruvian governing body that rules in Victor Larco Herrera district. It is located in Buenos Aires in west of Trujillo city. It has legal autonomy granted by the law of municipalities of Peru

== Structure ==
- The Council, composed of the mayor and aldermen, is the regulatory and supervisory agency.
- The Mayor is the executive agency.
- The coordinating bodies are the Local Coordinating Council (district) and Neighborhood Boards

== Companies ==
- SEDALIB provides water and sanitation in La Libertad Region
- Caja Trujillo is a local bank

== See also ==
- Municipality of Trujillo
- Historic Centre of Trujillo
- Chan Chan
- Huanchaco
- Puerto Chicama
- Chimu
- Pacasmayo beach
- Plaza de Armas of Trujillo
- Moche
- Víctor Larco Herrera District
- Vista Alegre
- Buenos Aires
- Las Delicias beach
- Independence of Trujillo
- Wall of Trujillo
- Santiago de Huamán
- Lake Conache
- Marinera Festival
- Trujillo Spring Festival
- Wetlands of Huanchaco
- Salaverry beach
- Puerto Morín
- Virú culture
- Marcahuamachuco
- Wiracochapampa
