= Municipality of Trujillo =

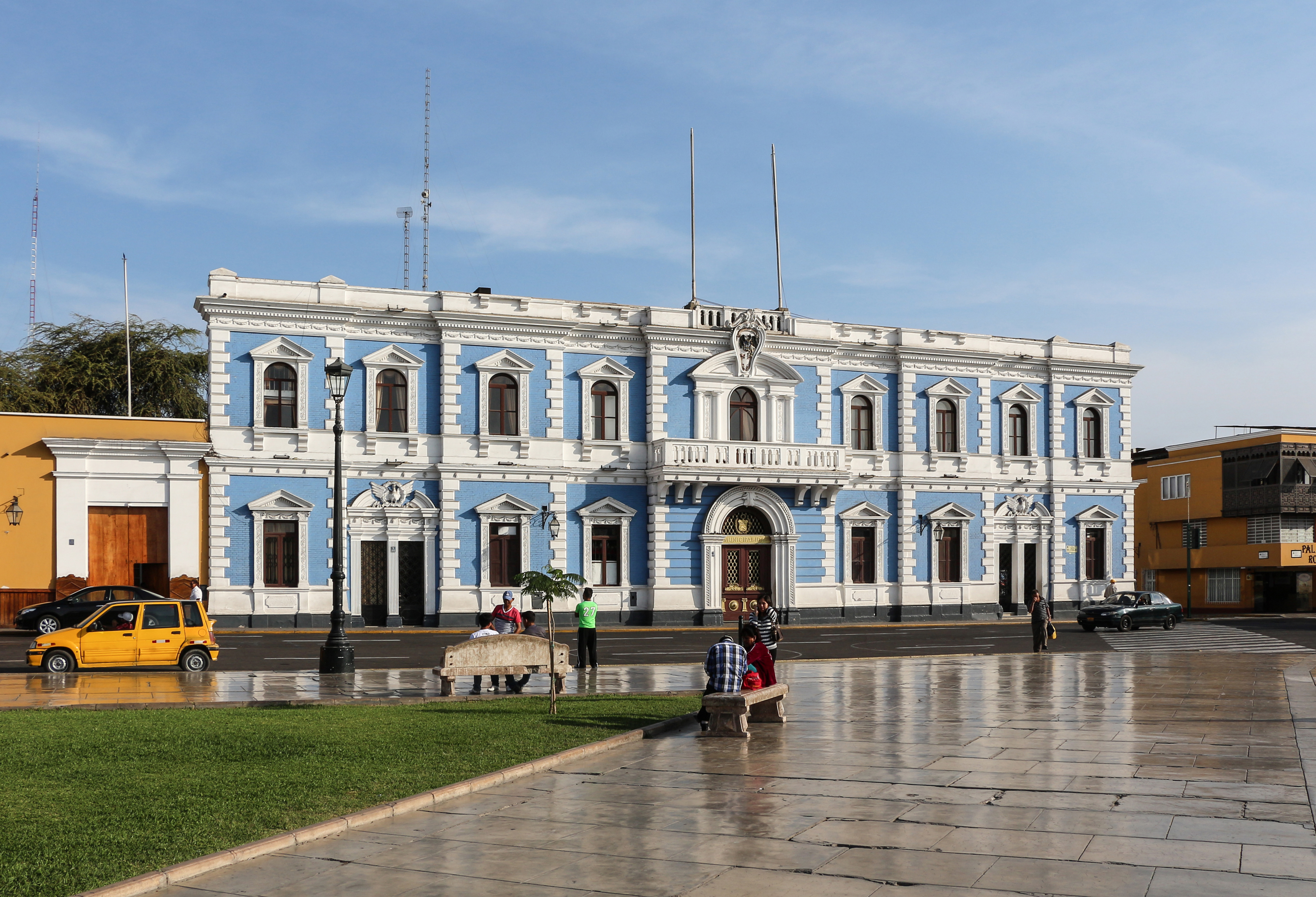
View of The Municipal Palace of Trujillo in the Plaza de Armas of the city located in its Historic Centre, on December 29, 1820 the independence of Trujillo was proclaimed by the Marquis of Torre Tagle. In honour to the city the Freedom Monument was made by sculptor Edmund Moeller.

The Municipality of Trujillo is the Peruvian public institution of government for Trujillo Province, Peru. It is located in the city of Trujillo and is responsible for the supply and management of the province and its districts. This includes rural and urban towns and the provision of local services within its jurisdiction. It is a politically autonomous legal entity and as such it deals with economic and administrative matters.

== History ==
The first Cabildo (council) in Trujillo was commenced on March 5, 1535 by Francisco Pizarro. Pizarro appointed Martin de Estete as Lieutenant Governor and Rodrigo Lozano and Blas de Atienza as mayors. Alonso de Alvarado, Garcia Contreras, Diego Verdejo, Pedro Mato and Pedro de Villafranca were appointed as counselors. Since 2010, it has celebrated the One Week Anniversary of Trujillo Municipality in honor of the act.

== Structure ==
The Council, composed of the mayor and aldermen, is the regulatory and supervisory agency. The Mayor runs the executive agency. Other groups include the Local Coordinating Council (provincial or district) and neighborhood boards.

The executive includesmMunicipal management, internal audit, the public attorney, the office of legal counsel and the office of planning and budget.

== Related Companies ==
- SEDALIB, provider of water supply and sanitation in La Libertad Region.
- Caja Trujillo, banking institution.

== See also ==
- Historic Centre of Trujillo
- Chan Chan
- Huanchaco
- Puerto Chicama
- Chimu
- Pacasmayo beach
- Plaza de Armas of Trujillo
- Moche
- Víctor Larco Herrera District
- Vista Alegre
- Buenos Aires
- Las Delicias beach
- Independence of Trujillo
- Wall of Trujillo
- Santiago de Huamán
- Lake Conache
- Marinera Festival
- Trujillo Spring Festival
- Wetlands of Huanchaco
- Association of Breeders and Owners of Paso Horses in La Libertad
- Salaverry beach
- Puerto Morín
- Virú culture
- Marcahuamachuco
- Wiracochapampa
