= Mansiche, La Libertad, Peru =

Mansiche San Salvador de Mansiche
- Location within Peru
- Coordinates: 8°6.0′11.78″S 79°2.0′26.99″W
- Country: Peru
- Region: La Libertad Region
- Province: Trujillo
- District: Trujillo

Government
  - Mayor: Carlos Vásquez Llamo
- Elevation: 30 m (98 ft)

Population (2005)
  - Urban: 10,000 (estimated)
- Time zone: UTC-5 (PET)
- Website: Municipality of Trujillo

Mansiche or San Salvador de Mansiche is a locality located in Trujillo city in northern Peru. This is an old town since colonial era.

== History ==
Located in the northwest of Trujillo District was the outsides of the colonial city of Trujillo. In this town is located an old colonial church called Iglesia de Mansiche or Iglesia de San Salvador de Mansiche. In the lands near this old town now are located several urban sectors as Jorge Chavez, Santa Isabel, Mansiche, etc. and also there is located the biggest sport complex in the city called Sports complex Mansiche.

== Interesting places ==
- Sports complex Mansiche
- Iglesia de Mansiche

== See also ==
- Trujillo
- Historic Centre of Trujillo
- Chan Chan
- Puerto Chicama
- Chimu
- Pacasmayo beach
- Marcahuamachuco
- Wiracochapampa
- Moche
- Víctor Larco Herrera District
- Vista Alegre
- Huanchaco
- Las Delicias beach
- La Libertad Region
- Trujillo Province, Peru
- Virú culture
- Lake Conache
- Marinera Festival
- Trujillo Spring Festival
- Wetlands of Huanchaco
- Salaverry
- Salaverry beach
- Puerto Morín
