= SEDALIB =

SEDALIB S.A. is a public law firm for water supply and sanitation in the Peruvian city of Trujillo. This company has as main function to provide potable water and sewerage services to Trujillo and other cities in La Libertad Region.

== History ==
Sedalib began operations on February 1, 1977. On May 6, 1993 was registered in the National Superintendency of Tax Administration (SUNAT) of Peru as "Public Law Enterprise" in the category of taxpayer and It was typed with the name of Sedalib SA, the company was assigned the taxpayer code N° 20131911310. The company had been administrated by a directory not renewed since 2002; In 2012 was elected a new directory for Sedalib.

== Composition ==
Sedalib consists of shares belonging to 12 municipalities of La Libertad Region, municipalities are:

- Municipality of Trujillo, is the largest shareholder with 23.765 shares.
- Municipality of Victor Larco Herrera
- Municipality of Salaverry
- Municipality of El Porvenir with 11% of the shares.
- Municipality of Pacasmayo
- Municipality of Chepén
- Municipality of Ascope

=== Directory ===
Sedalib Directory is elected by the general meeting of shareholders and is comprised by 1 representative of the regional government of La Libertad, 1 of the Chamber of Commerce of La Libertad, 1 the College of Engineers of La Libertad and 2 representatives of the municipalities shareholders.

== Related Companies ==
- Caja Trujillo, company of banking.

== See also ==
- Municipality of Trujillo
- Trujillo
- Marinera Festival
- Trujillo Spring Festival
- Las Delicias beach
- Huanchaco
- Santiago de Huamán
- Victor Larco Herrera District
