= Santiago de Huamán =

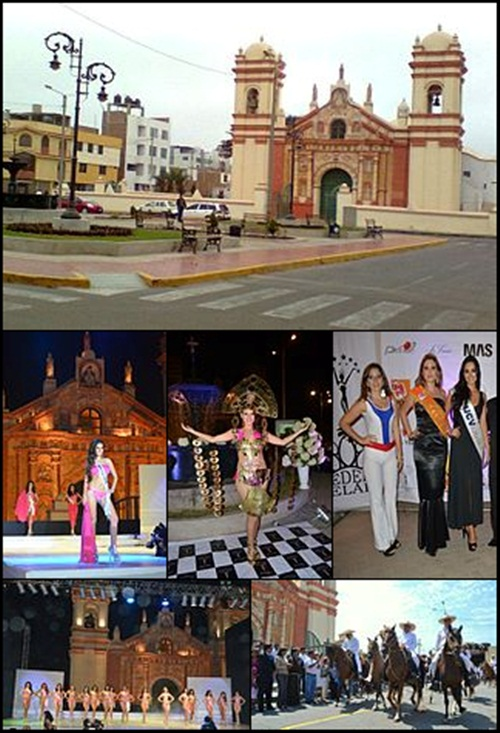
- From top and left to right: Huamán Church, Contest Miss International Peru 2012 in Huaman Square, Chalanes in Paso Horses

- Location within Peru
- Coordinates: 8°8.0′16.72″S 79°2′21.70″W
- Country: Peru
- Region: La Libertad Region
- Province: Trujillo
- District: Victor Larco

Government
  - Mayor: Carlos Vásquez Llamo
- Elevation: 15 m (49 ft)

Population (2005)
  - Demonym: Huamanino/a
- Time zone: UTC-5 (PET)
- Website: Víctor Larco Municipality

Santiago de Huamán, simply known as Huaman (from Quechua: Waman meaning 'hawk') is a traditional village in Trujillo, Peru; it is located in the western part of the city in Víctor Larco Herrera. Currently its main attractions are the Baroque-style church and the Patron Festivities that are held every year in May or June.

== History ==
Located in southwest Trujillo city, its territory was part of the Moche and Chimu cultures. It was later conquered by the Inca, who presumably gave it its name of Huaman, and subsequently seized by the Spanish.

The church of Santiago de Huamán, erected at the beginning of the 17th century, is without a doubt the oldest standing Catholic church in Trujillo. In the past it was dedicated to the Virgin of Mercy and was maintained by the Mercedarian friars.

== Festivals ==
- Patron Lord of Huaman

The origin of this tradition dates back more than 300 years. It is a religious festival that attracts pilgrims and tourists who visit the historic church of Santiago de Huaman. The celebration of the festival takes place from 13 to 27 May in honor of the Lord of Huaman; novenas, rosaries and confessions are offered by the faithful devotees. The celebrations also include morning and afternoon sports. On the event's main day, special celebrations are performed including flag hoisting, a solemn mass held by the Archbishop of Trujillo, a procession with the sacred image and the entrance into the church with a band of musicians. According to tradition, some fishermen went to the old beach known as La Bocana and found three chests that they managed to pull to shore. In one of the chests they discovered a priest's clothes, in the second the clothes of a saint, and in the third the holy image of the Lord in parts. They took everything to the town where they assembled and dressed the sacred image. One of the seamen upon waking said, "Lord Huaman, save us!" and thus named the saint. When the Bishop of Trujillo learned of the discovery, he ordered the construction of a chapel at the site but it was destroyed. It was later rebuilt and again destroyed; the natives and fishermen then decided to build the church in the village of Huaman.

- Patron Lord of the Sea is celebrated after the Lord of Huaman Festival.

== Tourism ==
- Santiago de Huamán Church is located in the town's main square.
- The Main Square is used for the festival of the Patron Lord of Huaman, as well as beauty contests.

== Gallery ==
Pictures of Huaman
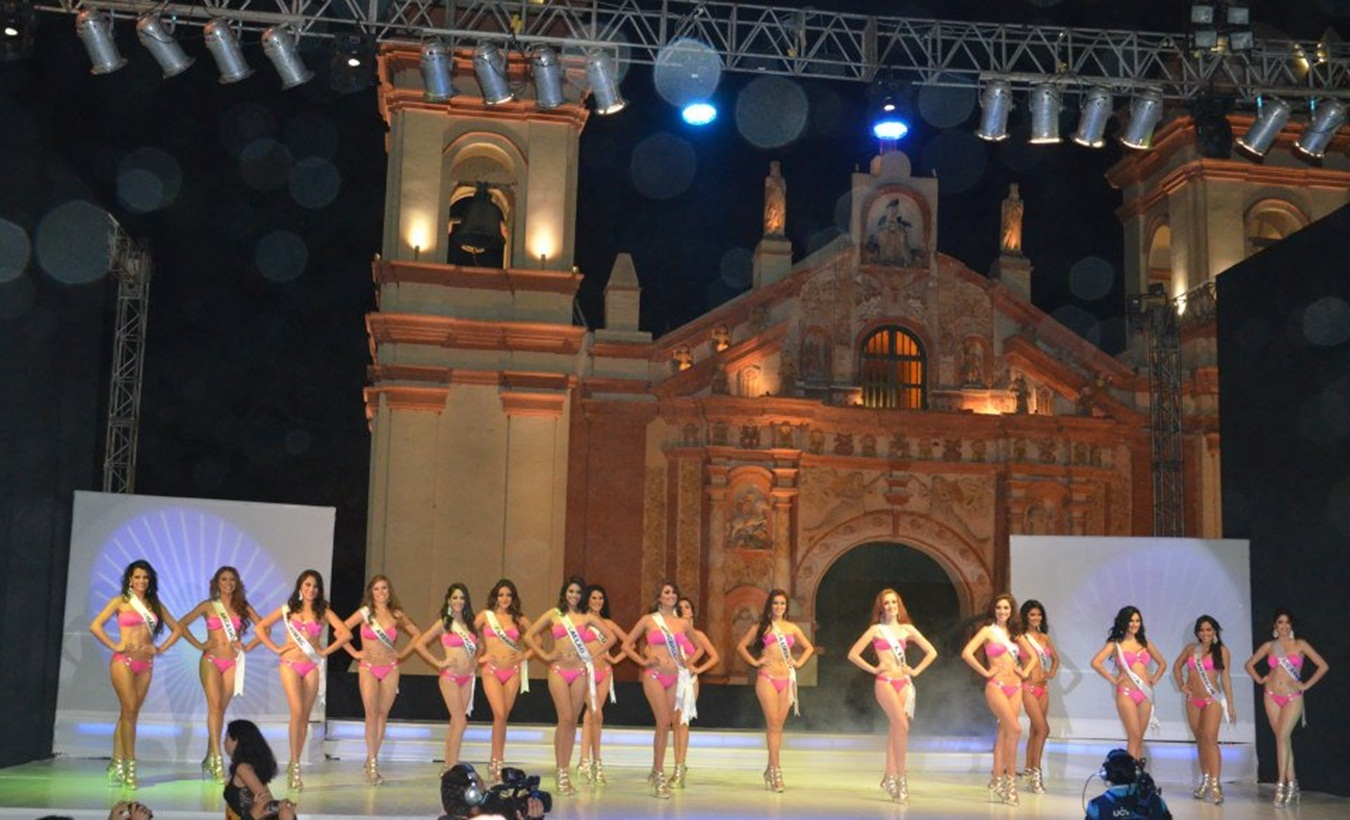
Miss International Peru in Huaman's Main Square

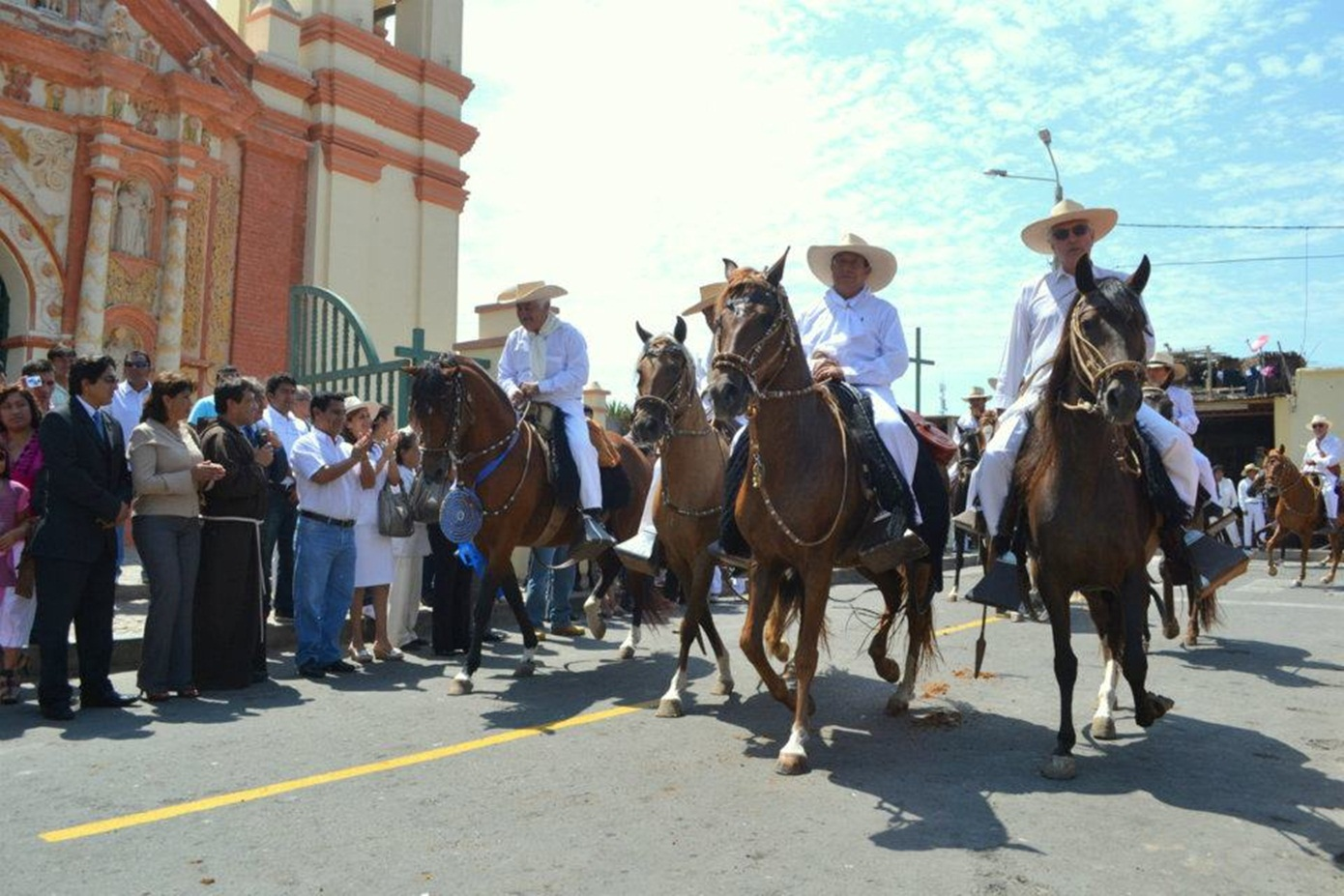
Peruvian paso horses in Huaman

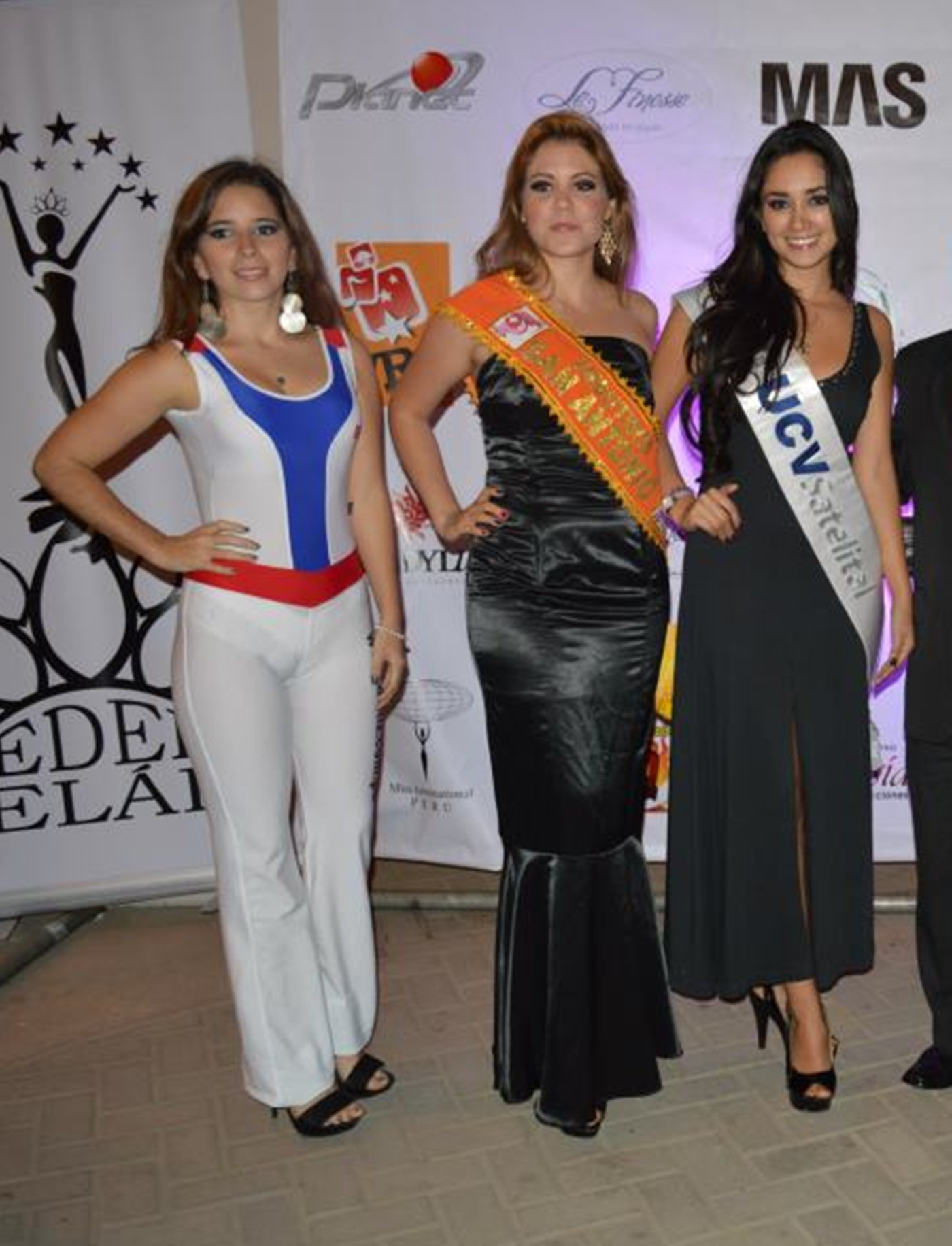
Miss International models celebrated in Huaman

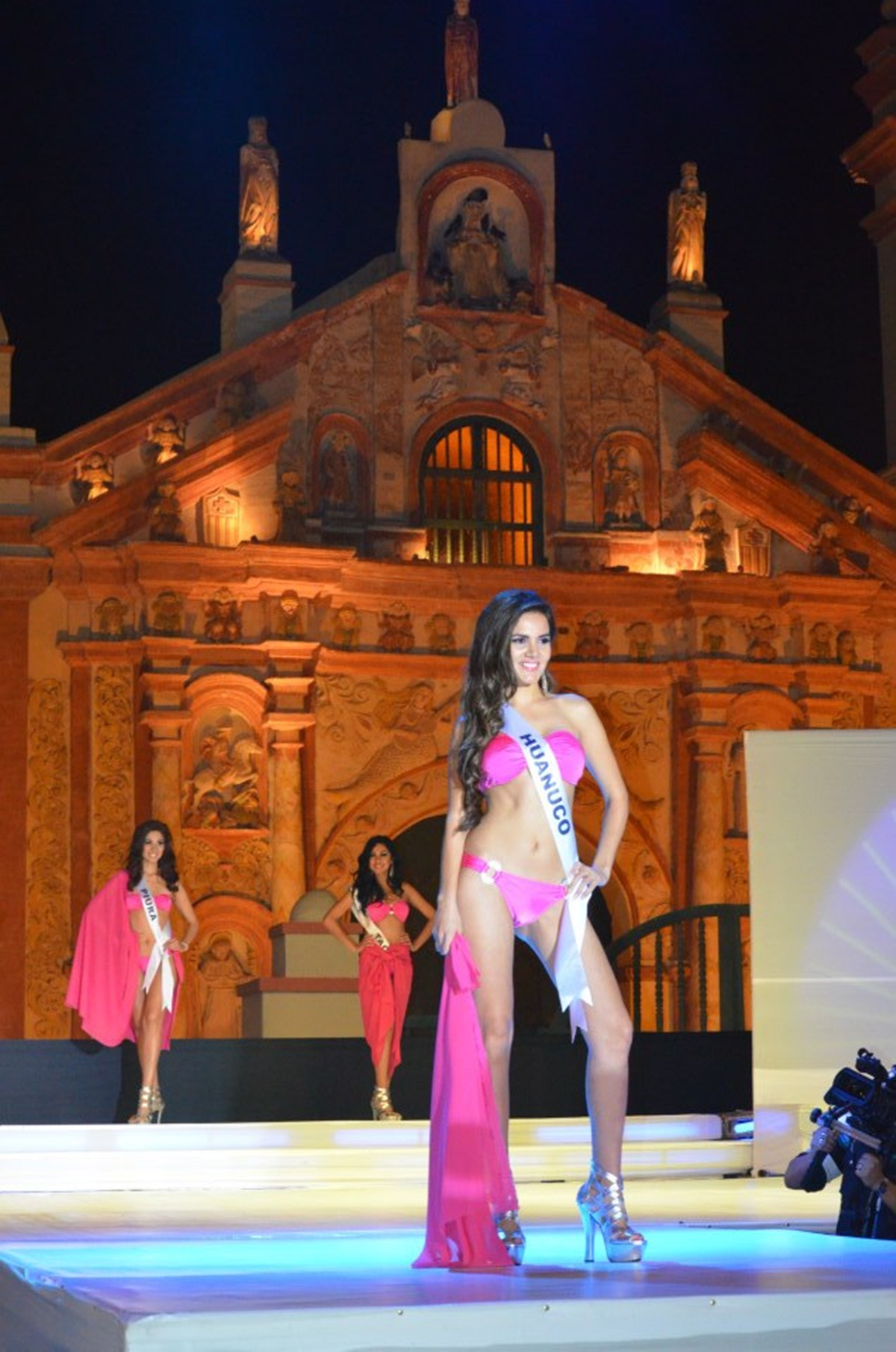
Miss Huanuco in Huaman Main Square

== Geography ==
=== Climate ===
Climate data for Santiago de Huamán (2011-2012)
Month	Jan	Feb	Mar	Apr	May	Jun	Jul	Aug	Sep	Oct	Nov	Dec	Year
Mean daily maximum °C (°F)	27.5 (81.5)	28.0 (82.4)	27.8 (82.0)	26.3 (79.3)	23.0 (73.4)	19.8 (67.6)	19.0 (66.2)	19.0 (66.2)	19.7 (67.5)	21.5 (70.7)	23.1 (73.6)	25.3 (77.5)	23.3 (73.9)
Daily mean °C (°F)	23.0 (73.4)	23.5 (74.3)	23.2 (73.8)	21.7 (71.1)	19.3 (66.7)	16.9 (62.4)	16.3 (61.3)	16.0 (60.8)	16.6 (61.9)	17.8 (64.0)	19.3 (66.7)	20.9 (69.6)	19.5 (67.2)
Mean daily minimum °C (°F)	18.5 (65.3)	19.0 (66.2)	18.5 (65.3)	17.0 (62.6)	15.5 (59.9)	14.0 (57.2)	13.5 (56.3)	13.0 (55.4)	13.5 (56.3)	14.0 (57.2)	15.5 (59.9)	16.5 (61.7)	15.7 (60.3)
Average relative humidity (%)	89	88	89	89	89	89	89	89	90	90	89	89	89
Source 1: accuweather.com
Source 2: Weatherbase Humidity: % Average Morning Relative Humidity

== Principal streets ==
- Huaman Avenue begins in the historic town.
- Cesar vallejo Street is one of the streets in the main square.

== See also ==
- Historic Centre of Trujillo
- Chan Chan
- Huanchaco
- Puerto Chicama
- Chimu
- Pacasmayo beach
- Marcahuamachuco
- Wiraquchapampa
- Moche
- Víctor Larco Herrera District
- Vista Alegre
- Buenos Aires
- Las Delicias beach
- La Libertad Region
- Trujillo Province, Peru
- Virú culture
- Wall of Trujillo
- Lake Conache
- Marinera Festival
- Trujillo Spring Festival
- Wetlands of Huanchaco
- Salaverry
- Salaverry beach
- Puerto Morín
