= Buenos Aires, Trujillo =

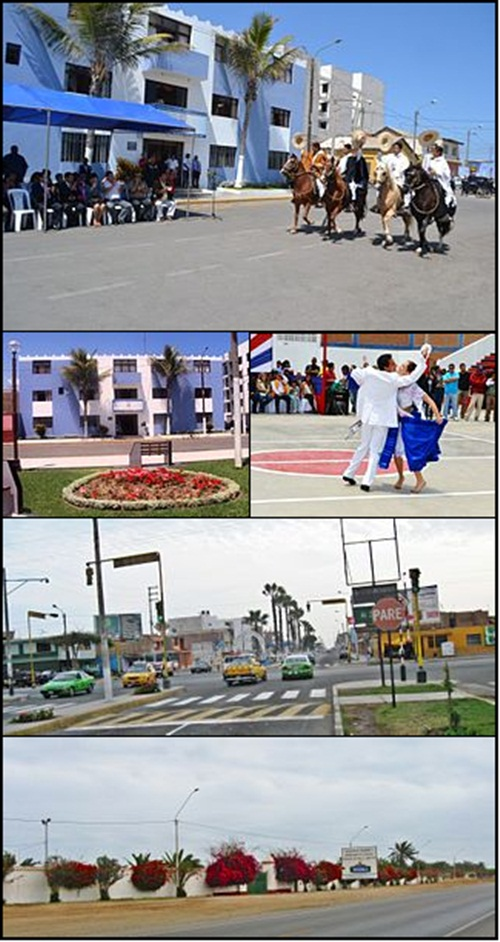
- From top and left to right: Paso horses in a parade, Municipality of victor Larco, marinera dance, Association of Breeders and Owners of Paso Horses in La Libertad, Buenos Aires welcome in Larco Avenue

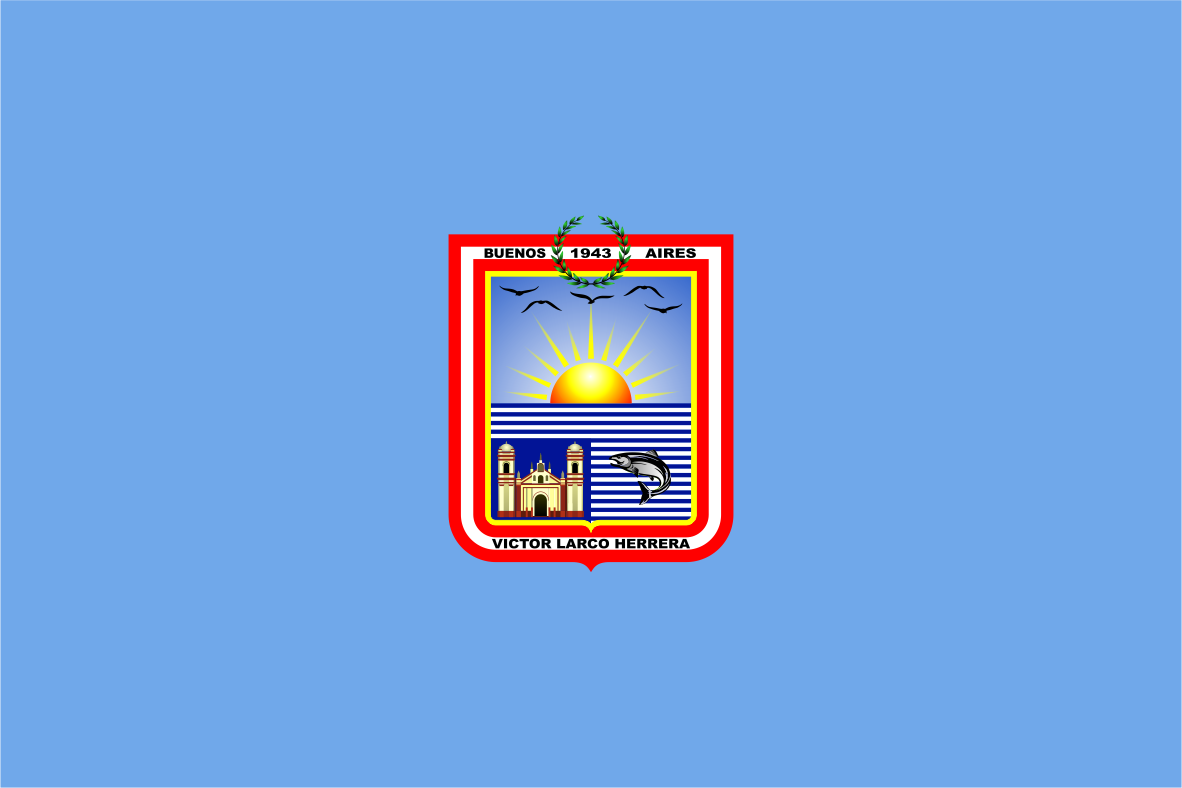
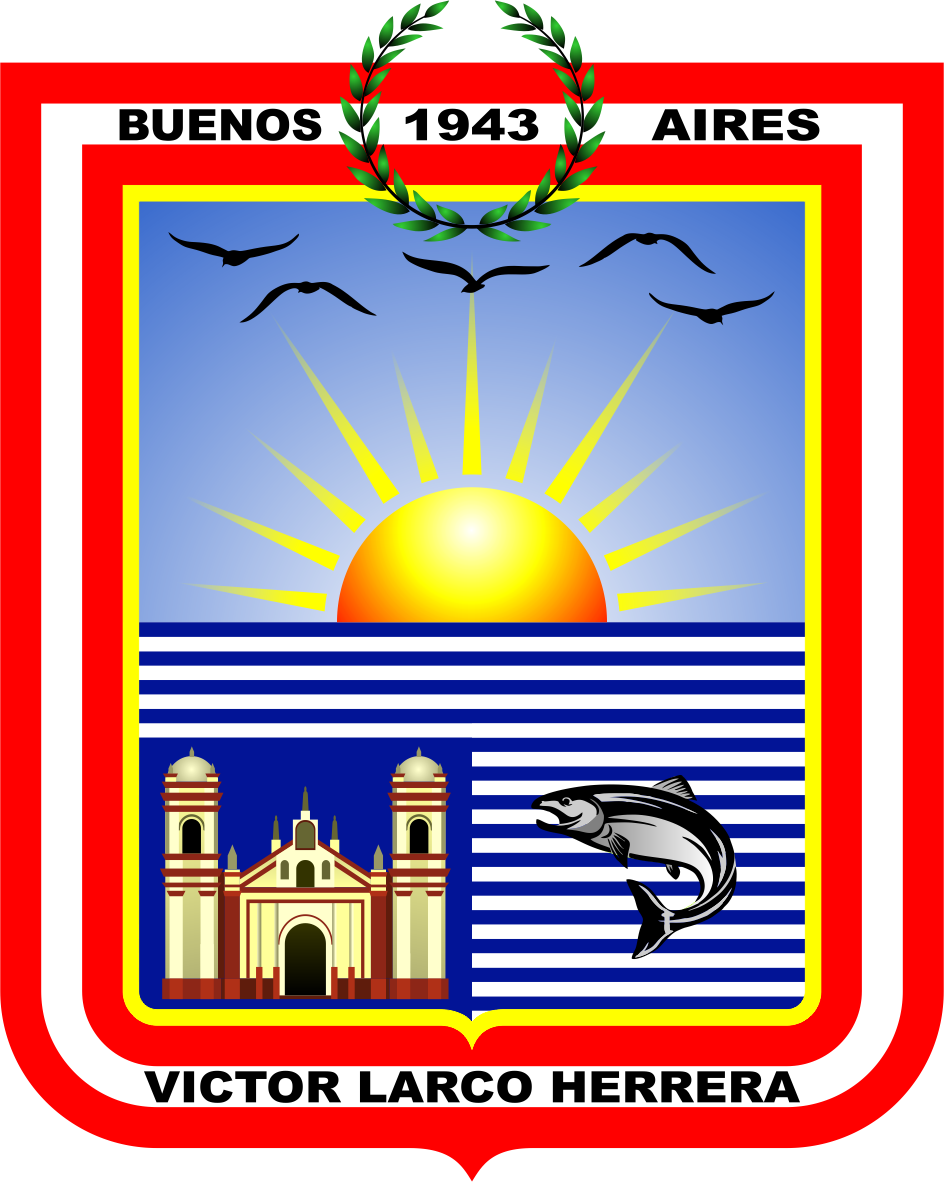
- Flag Seal

- Location within Peru
- Coordinates: 8°8.0′39.57″S 79°3.0′19.13″W
- Country: Peru
- Region: La Libertad Region
- Province: Trujillo
- District: Victor Larco

Government
  - Mayor: César Augusto Juárez Castillo
- Elevation: 3 m (9.8 ft)

Population (2005)
  - Urban: 20,000 (estimated)
- Time zone: UTC-5 (PET)
- Website: www.munivictorlarco.gob.pe

Buenos Aires is a coastal town and resort located in Víctor Larco Herrera district, in Trujillo, Peru. This locality is subdivided into three zones: Buenos Aires South, extending to the border with the Moche district, Buenos Aires Central limiting with Vista Alegre by east and the sector called Buenos Aires North extending up to the limit with Huanchaco. In the north side of this town is located the headquarters of the Municipality of Victor Larco Herrera district.

== History ==
Located in the southwest of Trujillo city was formed as a resort since the late nineteenth century. Appreciated for its scenery and cool weather and mild, was named Buenos Aires by Don Víctor Larco Herrera, illustrious benefactor of the district which now bears his name, who in 1915 established the railroad (and later a double track) between Trujillo and the resort of Buenos Aires, providing transport for people who lived there.

== Gallery ==
Tourism in Víctor Larco
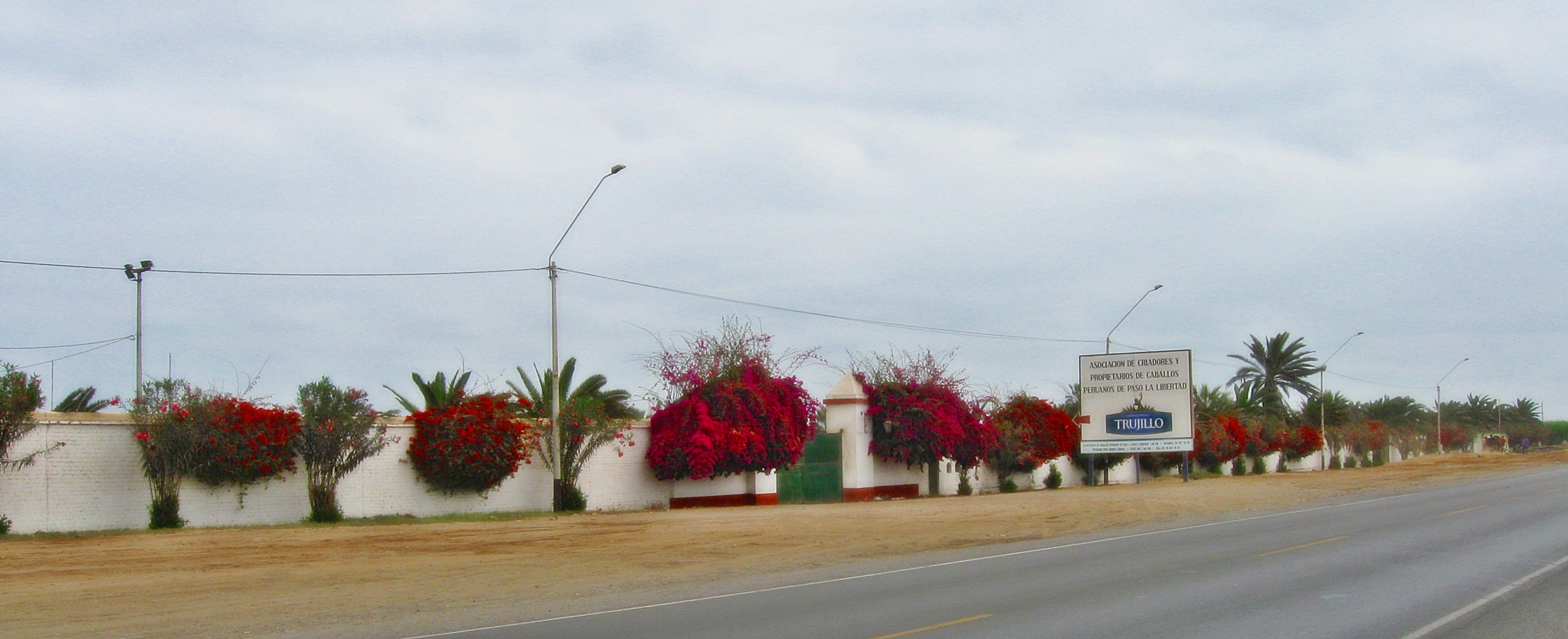
Association of Breeders and Owners of Paso Horses in La Libertad

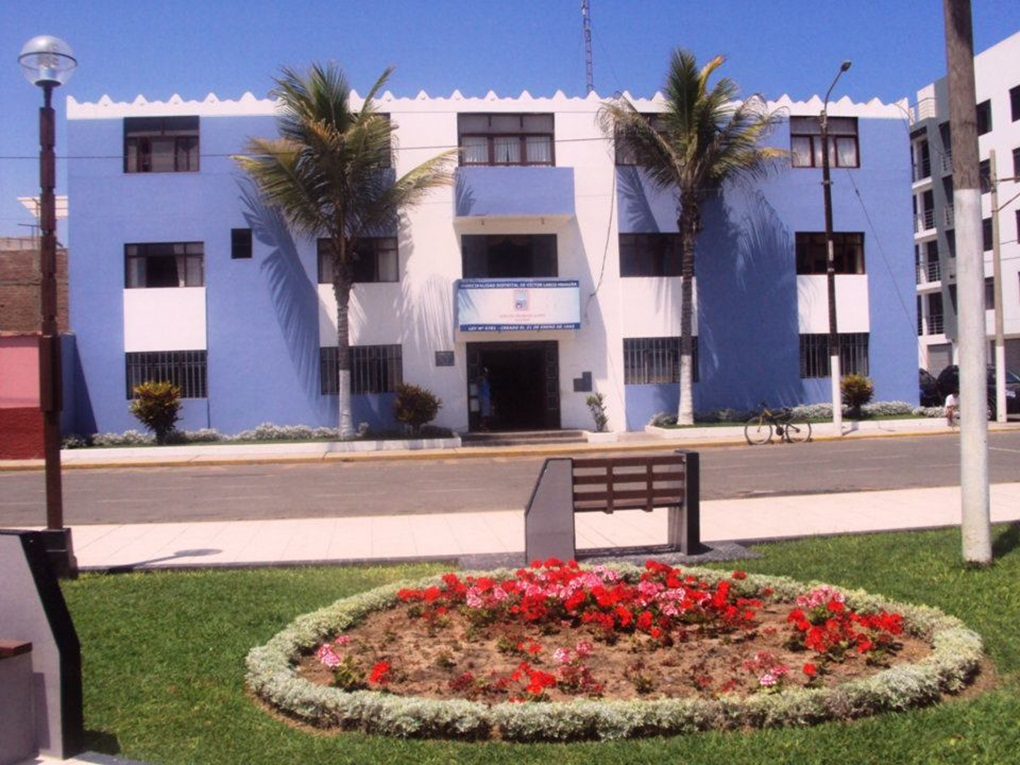
Victor Larco Municipality

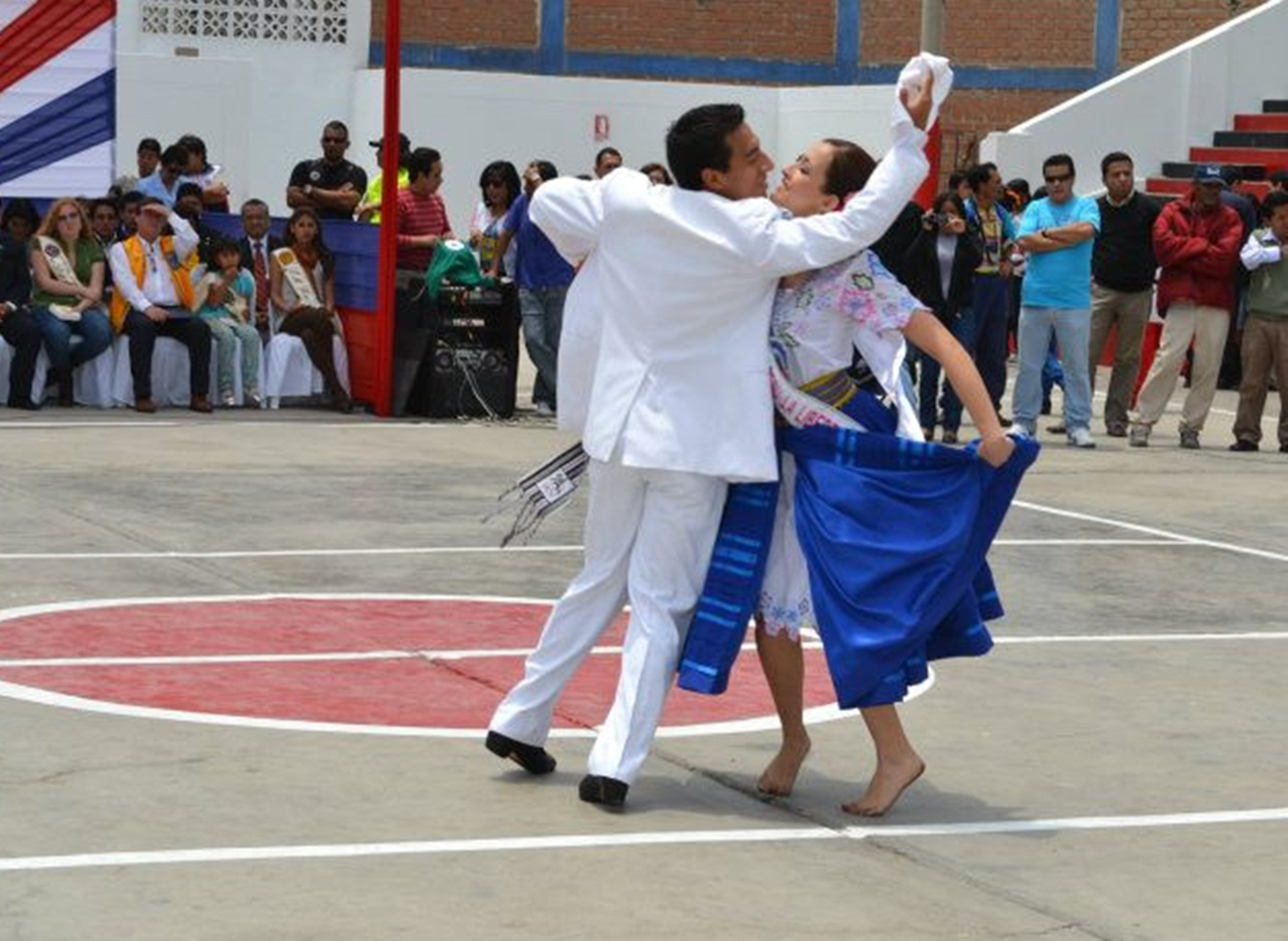
Marinera dance

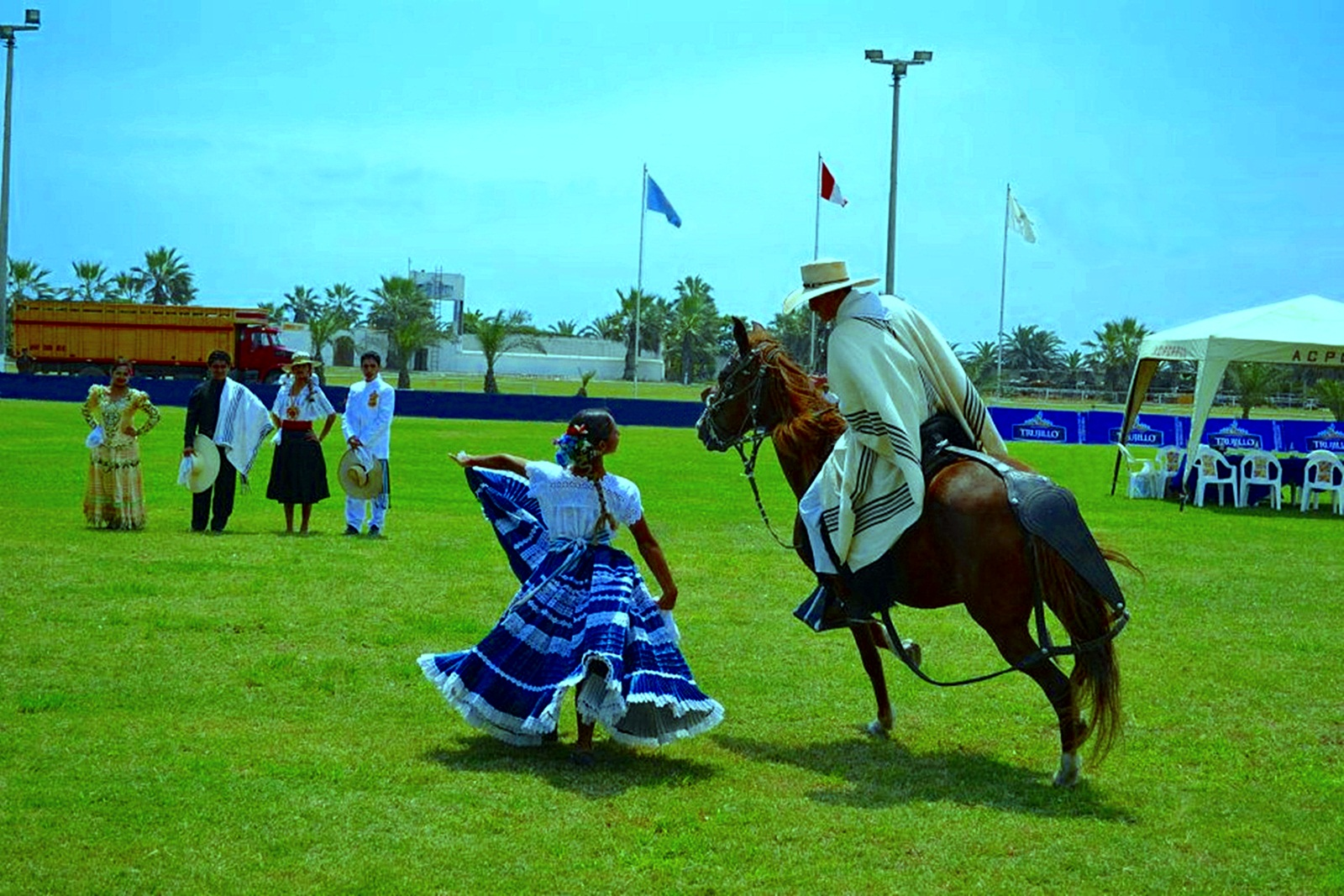
Peruvian Paso contest

== Geography ==
=== Climate ===
Climate data for Buenos Aires (2011-2012)
Month	Jan	Feb	Mar	Apr	May	Jun	Jul	Aug	Sep	Oct	Nov	Dec	Year
Mean daily maximum °C (°F)	27.5 (81.5)	28.0 (82.4)	27.8 (82.0)	26.3 (79.3)	23.0 (73.4)	19.8 (67.6)	19.0 (66.2)	19.0 (66.2)	19.7 (67.5)	21.5 (70.7)	23.1 (73.6)	25.3 (77.5)	23.3 (73.9)
Daily mean °C (°F)	23.0 (73.4)	23.5 (74.3)	23.2 (73.8)	21.7 (71.1)	19.3 (66.7)	16.9 (62.4)	16.3 (61.3)	16.0 (60.8)	16.6 (61.9)	17.8 (64.0)	19.3 (66.7)	20.9 (69.6)	19.5 (67.2)
Mean daily minimum °C (°F)	18.5 (65.3)	19.0 (66.2)	18.5 (65.3)	17.0 (62.6)	15.5 (59.9)	14.0 (57.2)	13.5 (56.3)	13.0 (55.4)	13.5 (56.3)	14.0 (57.2)	15.5 (59.9)	16.5 (61.7)	15.7 (60.3)
Average relative humidity (%)	89	88	89	89	89	89	89	89	90	90	89	89	89
Source 1: accuweather.com
Source 2: Weatherbase Humidity: % Average Morning Relative Humidity

== Places of interest ==
- Association of Breeders and Owners of Paso Horses in La Libertad
- Santa Rosa Church
- Moche River

== See also ==
- Trujillo
- Historic Centre of Trujillo
- Chan Chan
- Puerto Chicama
- Chimu
- Pacasmayo beach
- Marcahuamachuco
- Wiracochapampa
- Moche
- Víctor Larco Herrera District
- Vista Alegre
- Huanchaco
- Las Delicias beach
- La Libertad Region
- Trujillo Province, Peru
- Virú culture
- Lake Conache
- Marinera Festival
- Trujillo Spring Festival
- Wetlands of Huanchaco
- Salaverry
- Salaverry beach
- Puerto Morín
