= Puerto Morín =

Puerto Morin Guañape Puerto Guañape
- Location within Peru
- Coordinates: 08°24′11.98″S 78°53′45.48″W
- Country: Peru
- Region: La Libertad Region
- Province: Virú
- District: Virú

Government
  - Mayor: Roger Cruz Alarcón (2011 - 2014)
- Elevation: 4 m (13 ft)
- Time zone: UTC-5 (PET)
- Website: www.muniproviru.gob.pe

Puerto Morín is a Peruvian village and a beach located in Virú District, in La Libertad Region. It is located about 45 km south of Trujillo city. Puerto Morín is located within the jurisdiction of the Municipality of Santa Elena, locality of Virú.

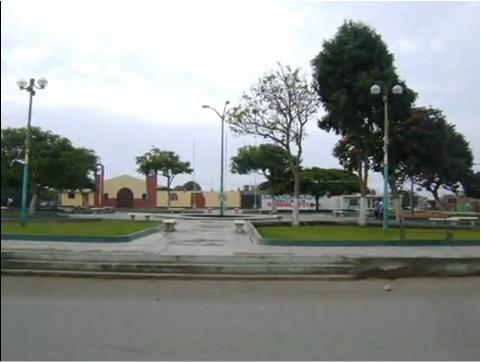
Guadalupito main square, near Puerto Morin

== History ==
The Guañape cove at the end of the nineteenth century, was a beach where people came to fish. The place acquired its present name of Puerto Morín following the construction of a small dock by the Frenchman Carlos Marie Morin Dutot, built with the help of the local inhabitants. Morin Dutot had arrived in the country in the 1870s. It is also a starting point to go to Guañape Islands, where there are several species of marine life such as sea lions, birds, etc.

== See also ==
- Trujillo
- Historic Centre of Trujillo
- Chan Chan
- Puerto Chicama
- Chimú culture
- Pacasmayo beach
- Marcahuamachuco
- Wiracochapampa
- Salaverry
- Buenos Aires, Trujillo
- San Jose Festival
- Huanchaco
- Moche
- Víctor Larco Herrera District
- Vista Alegre
- Las Delicias beach
- La Libertad Region
- Trujillo Province, Peru
- Virú culture
- Lake Conache
- Marinera Festival
- Trujillo Spring Festival
- Wetlands of Huanchaco
