= Vista Alegre, Trujillo =

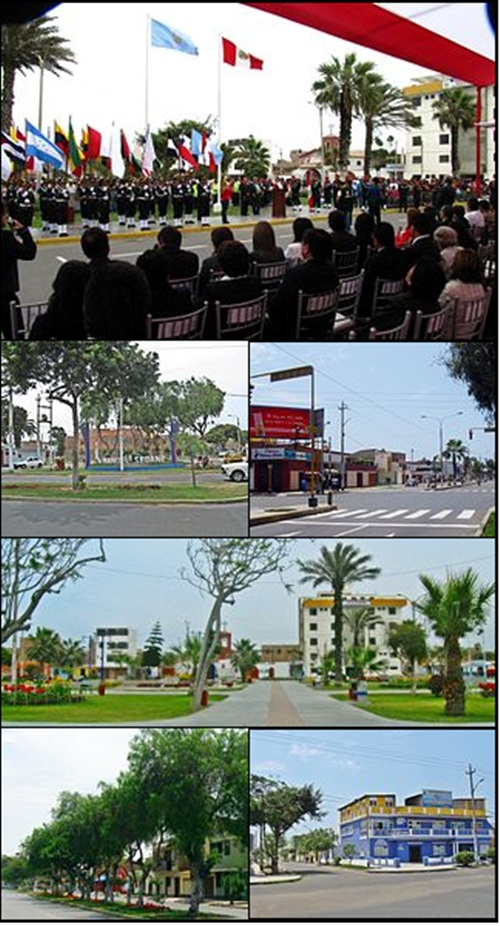
- From top and left to right: Civic Ceremony in the Main Square of Vista Alegre, Manuel Seoane avenue, View of Vista Alegre from Larco Avenue, Vista Alegre Hospital, Huaman avenue, Tercer Milenio High School

- Location within Peru
- Coordinates: 8°8.0′20.15″S 79°2′53.67″W
- Country: Peru
- Region: La Libertad
- Province: Trujillo
- District: Victor Larco

Government
  - Mayor: Carlos Vásquez Llamo (Victor Larco district Mayor)
- Elevation: 5 m (16 ft)

Population (2007)
  - Urban: 10,000 (estimated)
- Demonym: Vistalegrino(a)
- Time zone: UTC-5 (PET)
- Website: Víctor Larco

Vista Alegre is a town in the southwest side of Trujillo city, is in Victor Larco Herrera District in the province of Trujillo, La Libertad Region, Peru.

== Population ==
This seaside town located one kilometer approximately from the sea, is completely urbanized and at year 2011 its estimated population is 10,000 people. In this town is located an office of the RENIEC located at the intersection of Larco avenue and Ayacucho street.

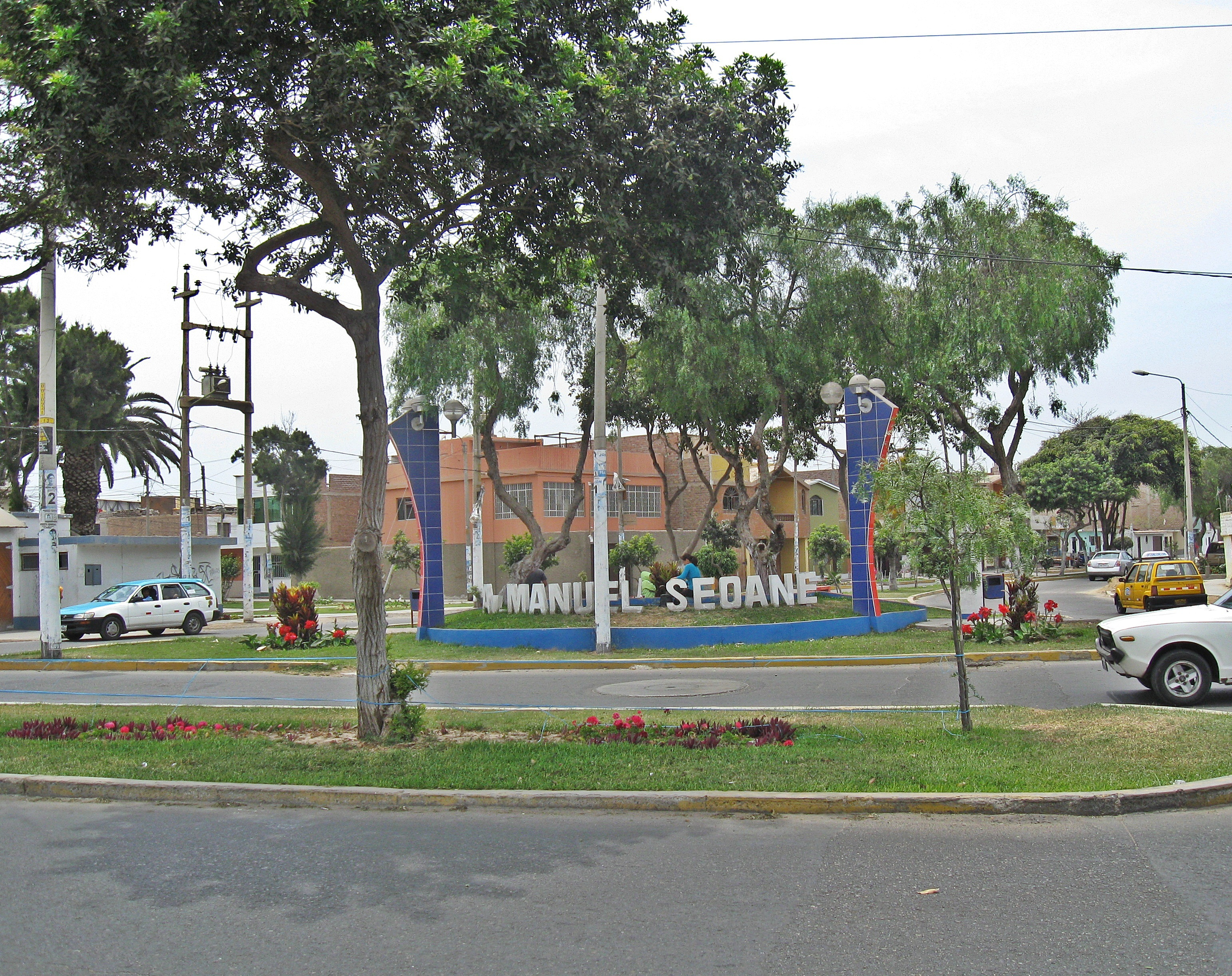
Manuel Seoane Avenue, extends up to Buenos Aires beach

== Infrastructure ==
In the education sector, there are several schools as Víctor Larco and Andrés Avelino Cáceres. In the health sector, this town has the Vista Alegre Hospital inaugurated in July 2011 intended for the attention of the district's population Victor Larco Herrera. In the sports sector, it is used the Vista Alegre Stadium where develops the league championship soccer Victor Larco. Manuel Seoane Avenue is the main thoroughfare of the town which extends up to Buenos Aires beach.

== Main streets ==
- Manuel Seoane avenue, it starts in Huamán avenue and it goes till Pacific Ocean in Buenos Aires beach towards the west of Trujillo city.
- Larco Avenue, it passes at north part of Vista Alegre.
- Huamán Avenue, it passes at east side of Vista Alegre.
- Dos de Mayo Avenue it limits Vista Alegre with Buenos Aires in the west side.
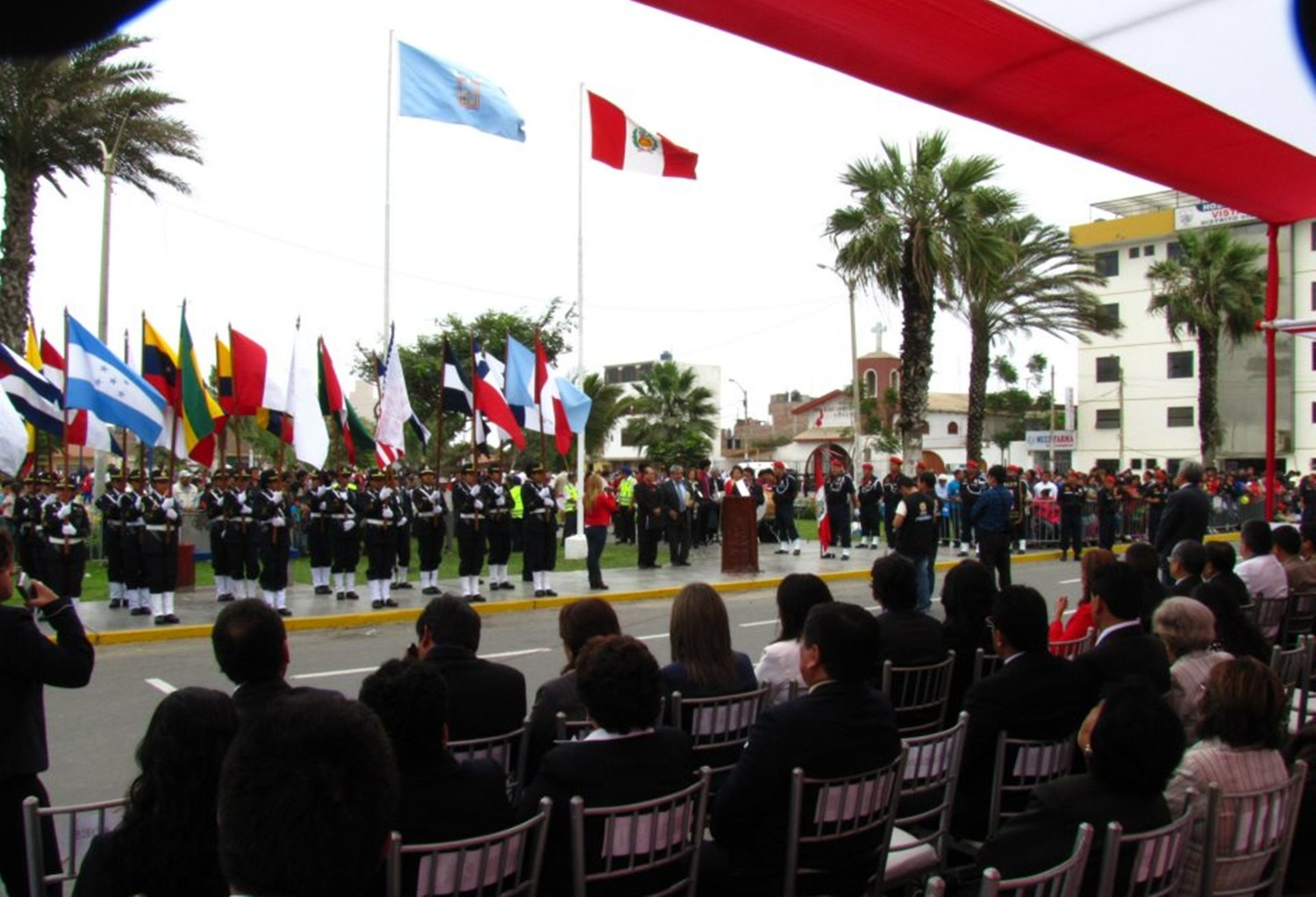
Civic celebration ceremony in the main square of Vista Alegre

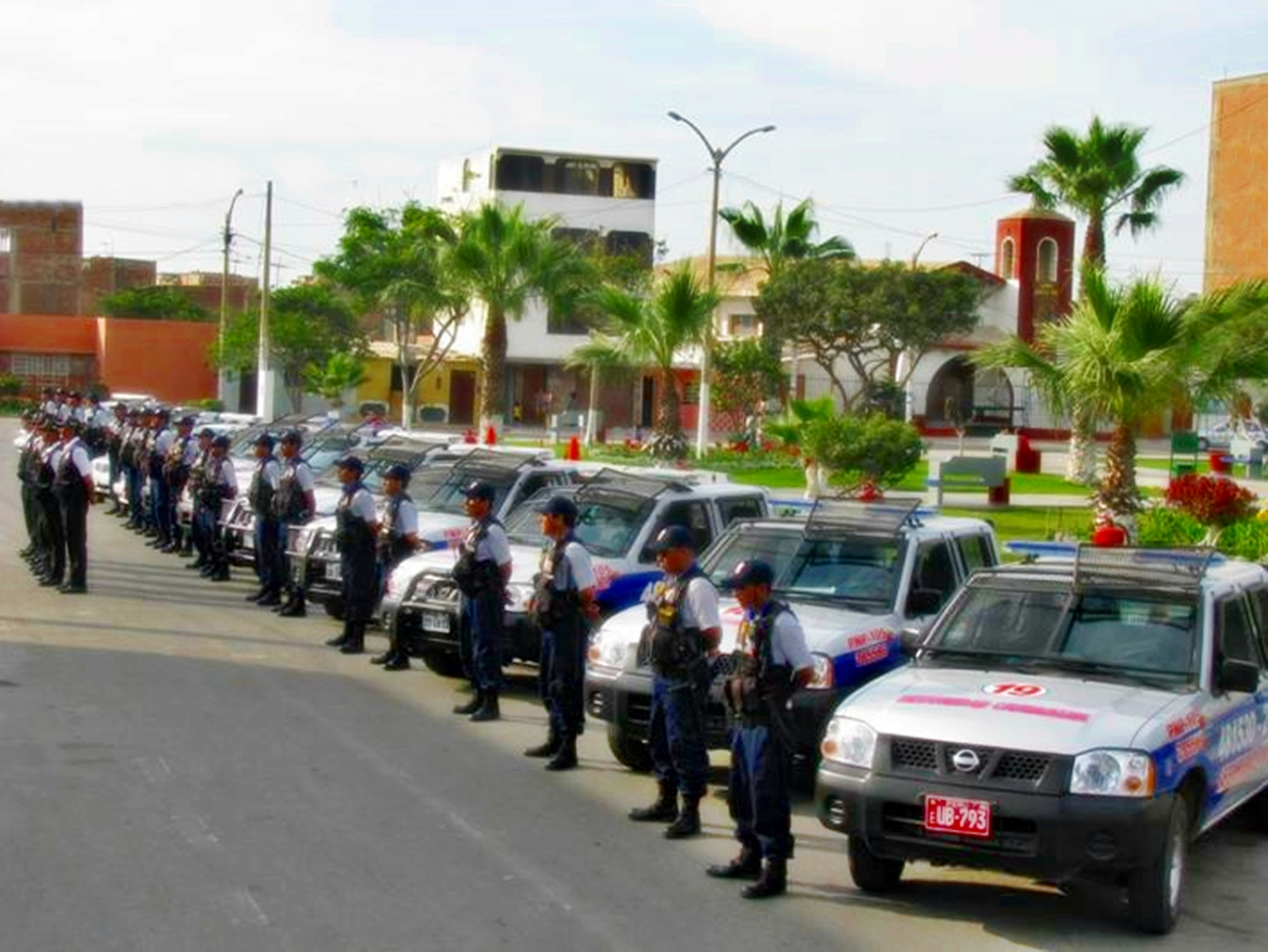
Citizen Security Base of víctor Larco district in the Main Plaza Vista Alegre

== Geography ==
Main square of Vista Alegre is located at coordinates 79° 02' 53.61" longitude west of Greenwich meridian and 8° 8' 20.26" latitude south. In this central square is located the church of Vista Alegre, "Andrés Avelino Cáceres" school and Hospital Vista Alegre. Due to its proximity to the Pacific Ocean, 1 km from Buenos Aires beach, Vista Alegre has a temperate climate in the day, cold and wet at night without extreme temperatures. In winter, temperatures range between 14°C and 18°C with a humidity between 88% and 94%.

=== Climate ===
Climate data for Vista Alegre (2011-2012)
Month	Jan	Feb	Mar	Apr	May	Jun	Jul	Aug	Sep	Oct	Nov	Dec	Year
Mean daily maximum °C (°F)	27.5 (81.5)	28.0 (82.4)	27.8 (82.0)	26.3 (79.3)	23.0 (73.4)	19.8 (67.6)	19.0 (66.2)	19.0 (66.2)	19.7 (67.5)	21.5 (70.7)	23.1 (73.6)	25.3 (77.5)	23.3 (73.9)
Daily mean °C (°F)	23.0 (73.4)	23.5 (74.3)	23.2 (73.8)	21.7 (71.1)	19.3 (66.7)	16.9 (62.4)	16.3 (61.3)	16.0 (60.8)	16.6 (61.9)	17.8 (64.0)	19.3 (66.7)	20.9 (69.6)	19.5 (67.2)
Mean daily minimum °C (°F)	18.5 (65.3)	19.0 (66.2)	18.5 (65.3)	17.0 (62.6)	15.5 (59.9)	14.0 (57.2)	13.5 (56.3)	13.0 (55.4)	13.5 (56.3)	14.0 (57.2)	15.5 (59.9)	16.5 (61.7)	15.7 (60.3)
Average relative humidity (%)	89	88	89	89	89	89	89	89	90	90	89	89	89
Source 1: accuweather.com
Source 2: Weatherbase Humidity: % Average Morning Relative Humidity

== See also ==
- Trujillo
- Historic Centre of Trujillo
- Chan Chan
- Chicama beach
- Chimu
- Pacasmayo beach
- Marcahuamachuco
- Wiracochapampa
- Moche
- Víctor Larco Herrera District
- Buenos Aires
- Huanchaco
- Las Delicias beach
- La Libertad Region
- Trujillo Province, Peru
- Virú culture
- Lake Conache
- Marinera Festival
- Trujillo Spring Festival
- Wetlands of Huanchaco
- Salaverry
- Salaverry beach
- Puerto Morín
- Santiago de Huamán
