= Caja Trujillo =

Peruvian bank

- Type: Bank
- Industry: Financial services
- Founded: October 19, 1982; 43 years ago
- Headquarters: Trujillo, Peru
- Products: Retail banking Corporate Banking
- Owner: Municipality of Trujillo
- Website: www.cajatrujillo.com.pe

Caja Trujillo is a Peruvian bank centered in Trujillo city, in the financial sector. It provides services mainly to entrepreneurs in the SME sector. Currently, it is the largest financial company in its region with branches in different regions of the coast and highlands of Peru.

== History ==
Caja Trujillo was founded as a microfinance institution on October 19, 1982. It is wholly owned by the Municipality of Trujillo. On November 12, 1984, it formally began operations in the financial sector.

According to a study published in 2010 by the magazine Peru Económico, it is a representative mark of the city.

In 2012, the president of the Annual general meeting was Cesar Acuña Peralta, the mayor of the city from 2011 to 2014.

== Regional branches ==
Caja Trujillo has branches and agents in the following regions of Peru:

- Tumbes
- Piura
- Lambayeque
- La Libertad
- Ancash
- Amazonas
- Cajamarca
- Lima
- San Martín
- Huánuco.
- Huacho

== Related Companies ==
- SEDALIB, company of Water supply and sanitation in La Libertad Region.
- Municipality of Trujillo

== See also ==
- Historic Centre of Trujillo
- Independence of Trujillo
- Wall of Trujillo
