= Salaverry =

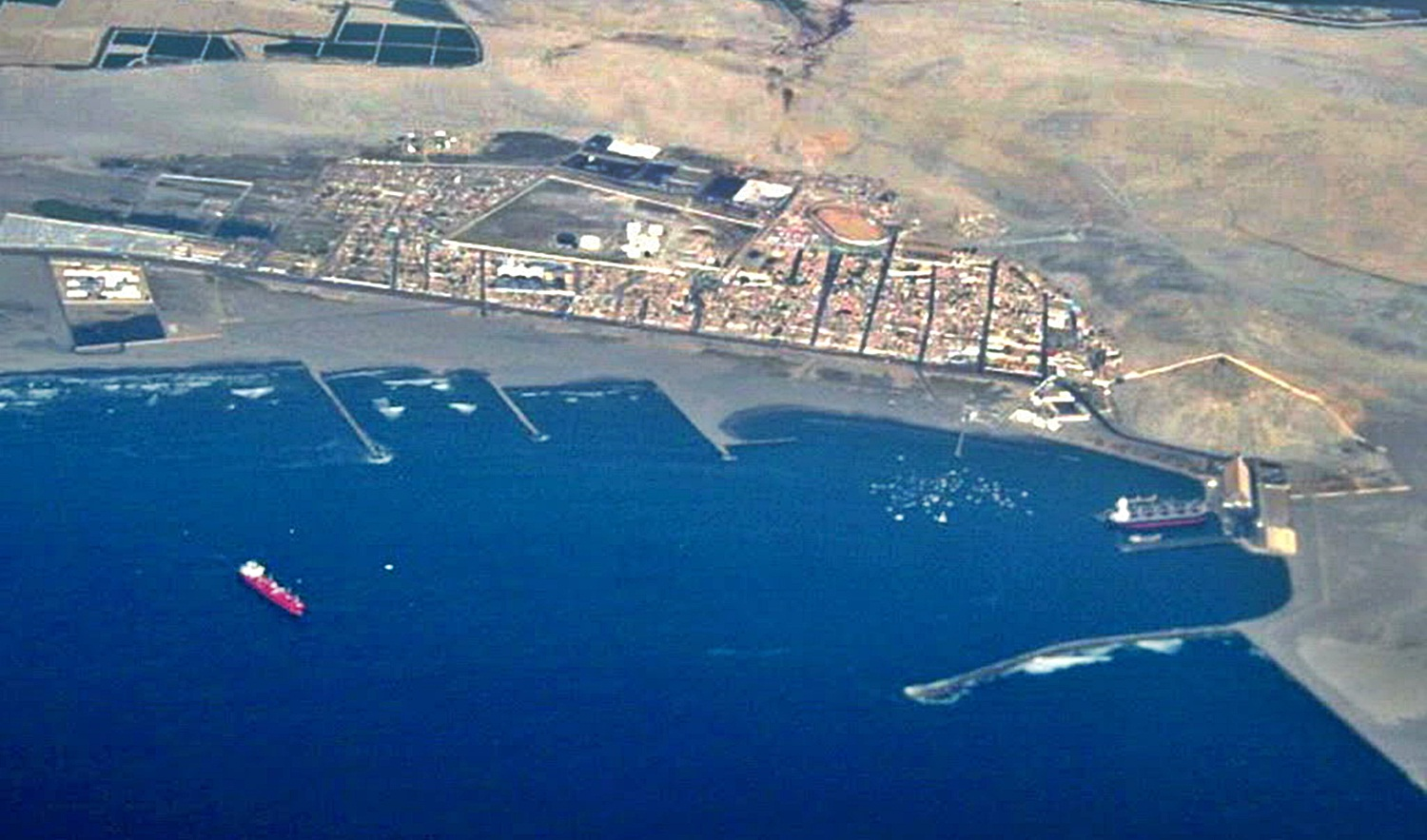
- Salaverry Port

- Flag Seal

- Location within Peru
- Coordinates: 8°13′17.02″S 78°58′34.97″W
- Country: Peru
- Region: La Libertad
- Province: Trujillo

Government
  - Mayor: Miguel Ángel Martínez Vargaz Durango

Population (2007)
  - Density: 444/km^{2} (1,150/sq mi)
  - Urban: 13,892
  - Demonym: Salaverrino(a)
- Time zone: UTC-5 (PET)
- Website: Municipality of Salaverry

Salaverry is a port town located 14 kilometres (8.7 mi) southeast of Trujillo city in the La Libertad Region, Peru. It is the capital of Salaverry District and it is located at around 8°13′16″S 78°58′34″W. The port, rebuilt in the 1960s by an English company, is able to accommodate large cruise ships.

== Climate ==
Climate data for Salaverry, elevation 4 m (13 ft), (1990–2009)
Month	Jan	Feb	Mar	Apr	May	Jun	Jul	Aug	Sep	Oct	Nov	Dec	Year
Mean daily maximum °C (°F)	25.5 (77.9)	26.3 (79.3)	26.4 (79.5)	24.7 (76.5)	22.9 (73.2)	21.9 (71.4)	20.8 (69.4)	20.5 (68.9)	20.1 (68.2)	20.8 (69.4)	22.1 (71.8)	23.5 (74.3)	23.0 (73.3)
Mean daily minimum °C (°F)	18.9 (66.0)	20.5 (68.9)	20.4 (68.7)	18.7 (65.7)	17.4 (63.3)	17.1 (62.8)	16.3 (61.3)	16.1 (61.0)	15.7 (60.3)	15.9 (60.6)	16.5 (61.7)	17.7 (63.9)	17.6 (63.7)
Average relative humidity (%)	88.2	86.7	87.9	89.6	90.7	90.3	87.6	90.3	90.2	89.8	88.6	88.4	89.0
Source: Sistema Nacional de Información Ambiental (precipitation and humidity 2000−2009)

== See also ==
- Buenos Aires, Trujillo
- Chicama, Peru
- Huanchaco
- Las Delicias, Trujillo
- Moche, Trujillo
- Puerto Chicama
- Trujillo, Peru
- Vista Alegre, Trujillo
