= Las Delicias, Trujillo =

Las Delicias
- Balneario
- Location within Peru
- Coordinates: 8°10′56.34″S 79°0′50.56″W
- Country: Peru
- Region: La Libertad Region
- Province: Trujillo
- District: Moche

Government
  - Mayor: Jose Rojas Garridia(2011 - 2014)
- Elevation: 4 m (13 ft)

Population (2007)
  - Urban: 15,000 (estimated)
- Time zone: UTC-5 (PET)
- Patron: San Valentin, San José de Nazaret
- Website: Municipalidad de Moche

Las Delicias is a coastal town located in Moche district, in Trujillo city, La Libertad Region, Peru. It is near the ancient town of Moche. This beach is between Buenos Aires and Salaverry towns.

== Attractions ==
- San Jose Festival, this festival is Held in the resort of Las Delicias in the district of Moche on 14, 15 and March 16, is a feast day and it has been a tradition with a strong Spanish influence, which are enjoyed various activities for adults, youth and children, party hosts are Don Jose and Dona Josefa and Ms Maja, the event begins with the description of characters, activities, bars, flamenco dancing, etc.. This festival is accompanied by a procession of the patron Saint Joseph, the fashion show, the bullfight, the parade of characters, and toromatch pamplonada in which involved several teams from other departments. Some houses are become in Spanish bars decorated with motifs like flags, grimaldas and posters.

== See also ==
- Trujillo
- Victor Larco Herrera
- Trujillo Province, Peru
- Huanchaco
- Vista Alegre
- Salaverry
- San Jose Festival
- Santiago de Huamán
