= Viracochapampa =

Archaeological site in Peru

- Wiracochapampa
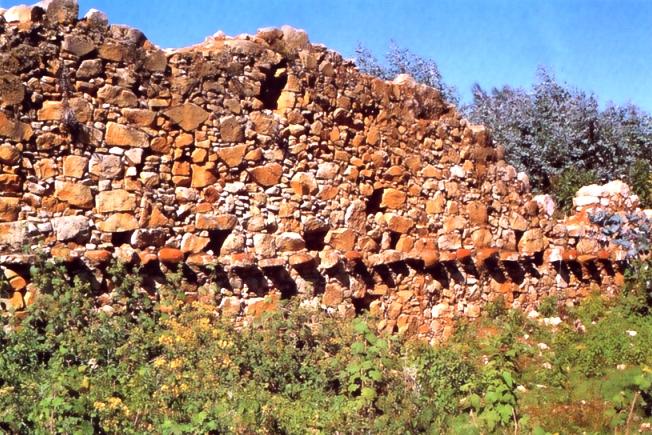
- Wall in Wiracochapampa

- Location within Peru
- 7°47′15.6″S 78°02′47.4″W
- Periods: Middle Horizon
- Cultures: Wari culture
- Location: Huamachuco, La Libertad

Viracochapampa, Huiracochapampa, or Wiracochapampa (possibly from Quechua wiraqucha: mister, sir, gentleman, god; or Wiracocha: one of the greatest Andean divinities; and pampa: plain) is an archaeological site with the remains of a building complex of ancient Peru of pre-Inca times. It was one of the administrative centers of the Wari culture. Viracochapampa is located about 3.5 km north of Huamachuco in the region of La Libertad at an elevation of 3,070 metres (10,072 ft).

== Chronology ==
The site was occupied from the late Middle Horizon 1B time to the first decades of period 2A, according to the chronology established by Dorothy Menzel, taking as reference the classic division of Horizons and Intermediate by John Rowe. These correspond to the 7th and 8th centuries of our era.

== See also ==
- Marcahuamachuco
- Chimu
- Mochica
- Trujillo
