= Trujillo Spring Festival =

- Genre: Spring Festival
- Begins: September
- Ends: October
- Frequency: annual
- Locations: Trujillo, Peru
- Years active: 1950 - present
- Inaugurated: 1950
- Most recent: 62° edition (2012)
- Attendance: 25.000 (estimated)
- Website: www.clubdeleones.8k.com

The Trujillo Spring Festival is a festival and cultural event that takes place in the Peruvian city of Trujillo, between the end of September and beginning of October each year. This spring festival is considered one of the most representative of Trujillo city and honors its nickname of City of the everlasting spring. This festival is also one of the largest in the country and attracts the attendance of thousands of tourists from around the planet. The main attraction of this festival is a traditional Corsican or spring parade, involving mainly beauty queens of Lions clubs across the continent; in the parade there's a competition in the decoration about spring allegory and to be honored with the award called the gold lion. It is organized by the Lions Club of Trujillo.

== History ==
The first Trujillo spring festival was held in 1950, and since that time has been held each year with the presence of many visitors from all around the world. The organization is in charge of the Lions Club of Trujillo. The International Spring Festival was formalized by Supreme Decree No. 15 of May 31, 1961 and by Act of Congress No. 15621 of September 28, 1965 which Trujillo was appointed with the title of "Capital of Spring" for the first government of Fernando Belaunde Terry. In recent editions of the festival artistic presentations are made in various parts of the city. By the 61st International Spring Festival, through regional ordinance on September 30, 2011, in the province of Trujillo was declared a holiday.

== Characters of the festival ==
- Queens
- Guaripolas
- Musician bands
- Dance groups
- Allegoric cars

== Gallery ==
Parade at the Trujillo Spring Festival
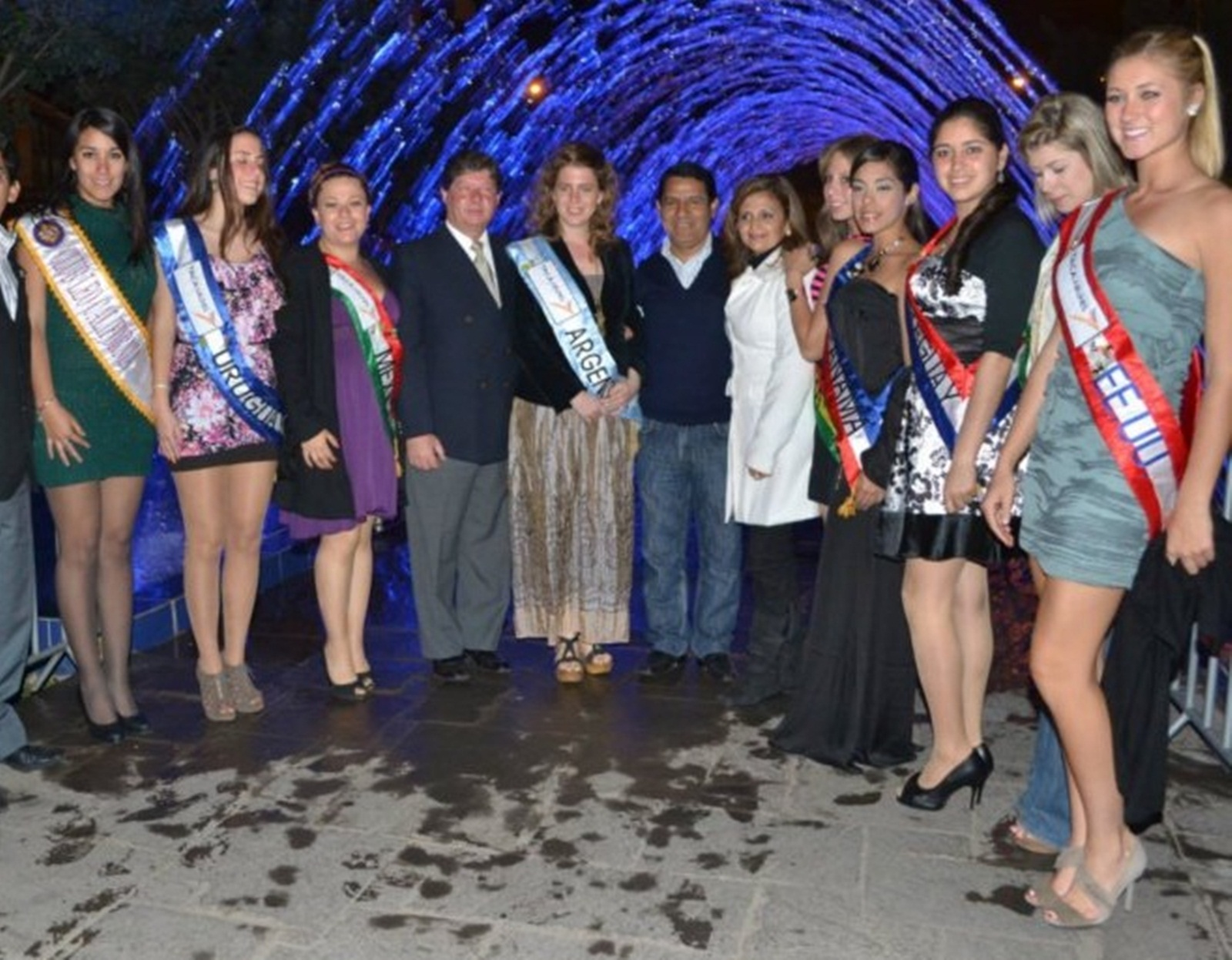
Queens in the Paseo de Aguas in Víctor Larco District

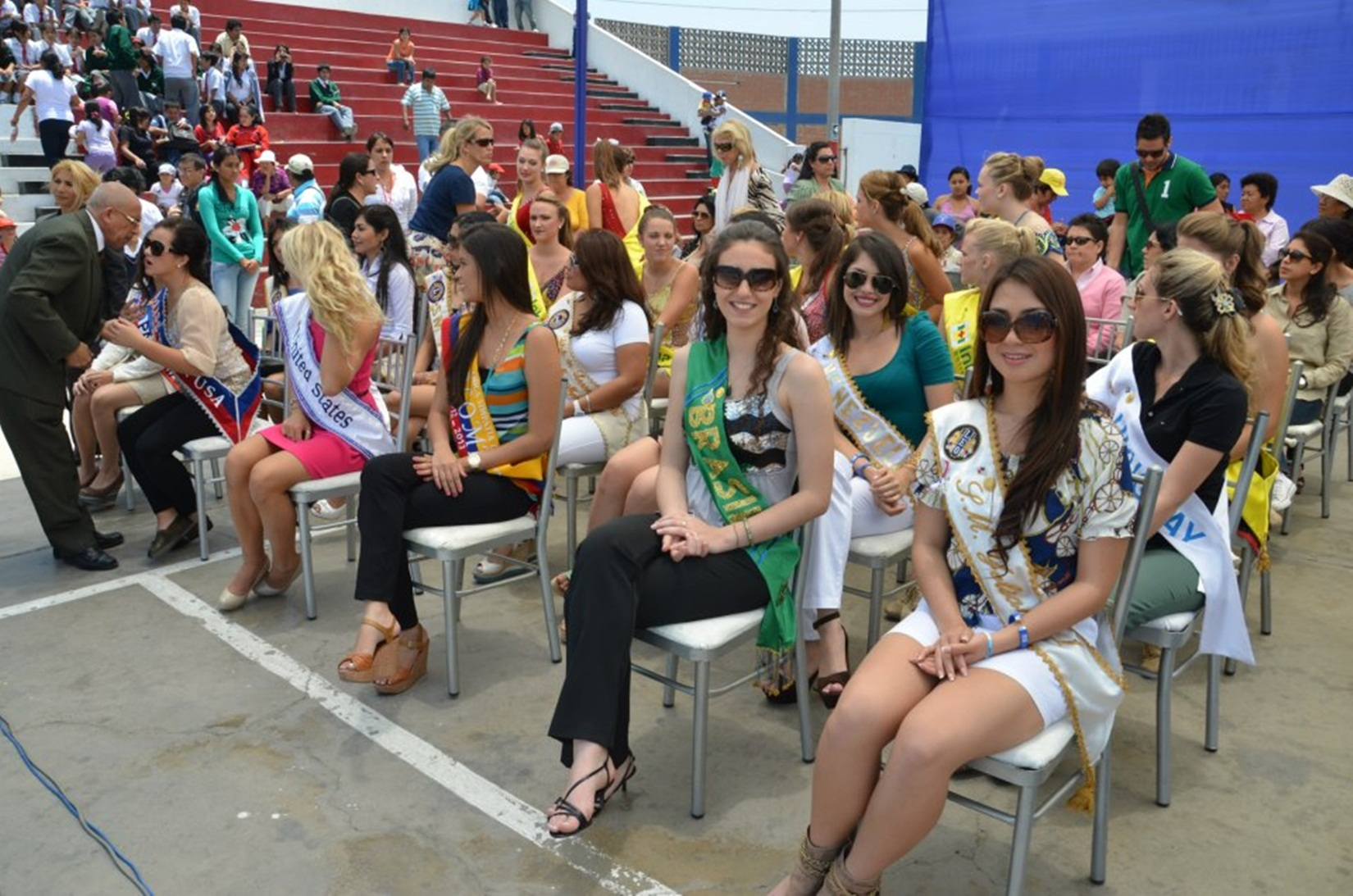
Spring Queens

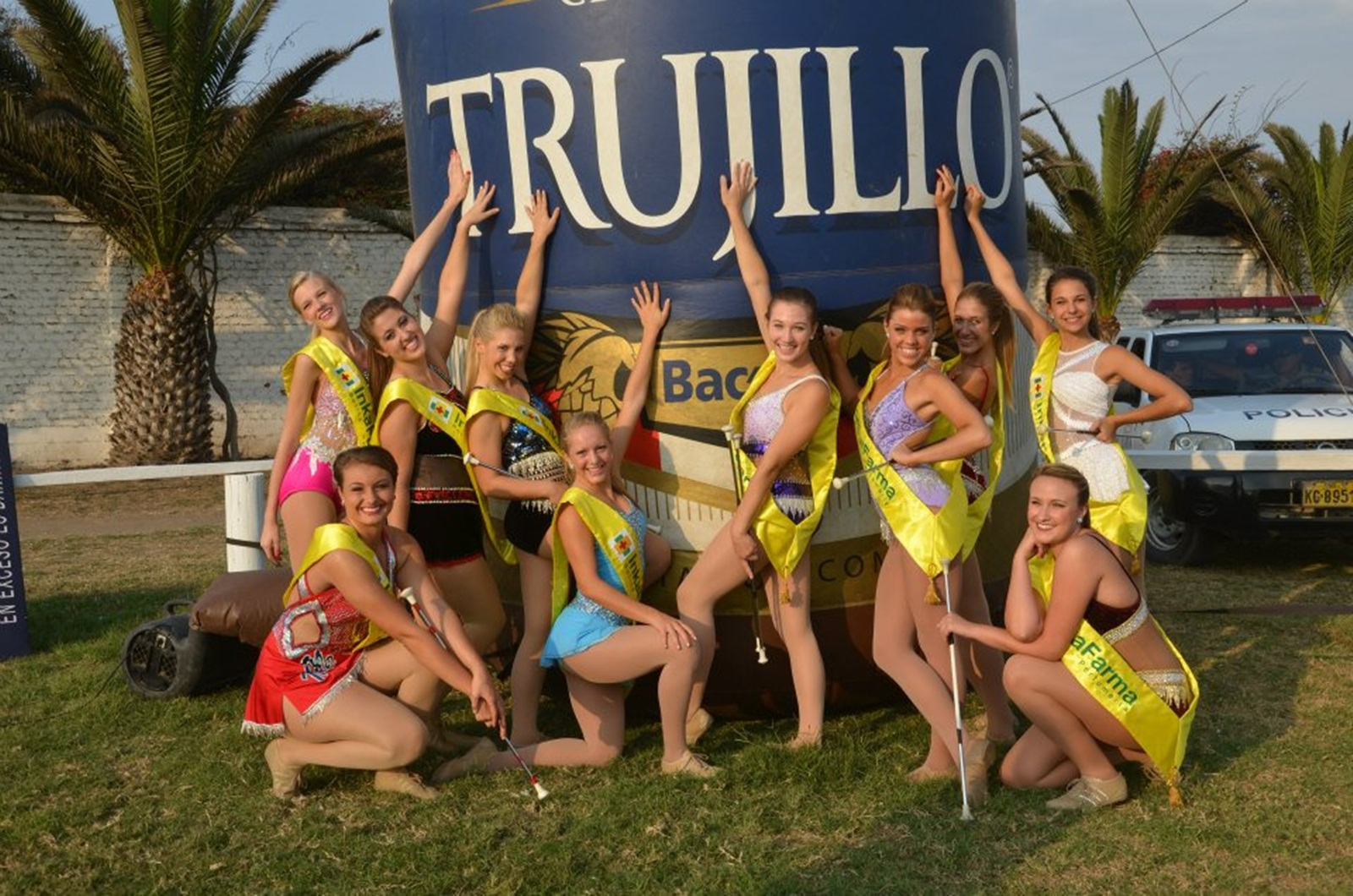
Guaripolas in Trujillo Spring Festival

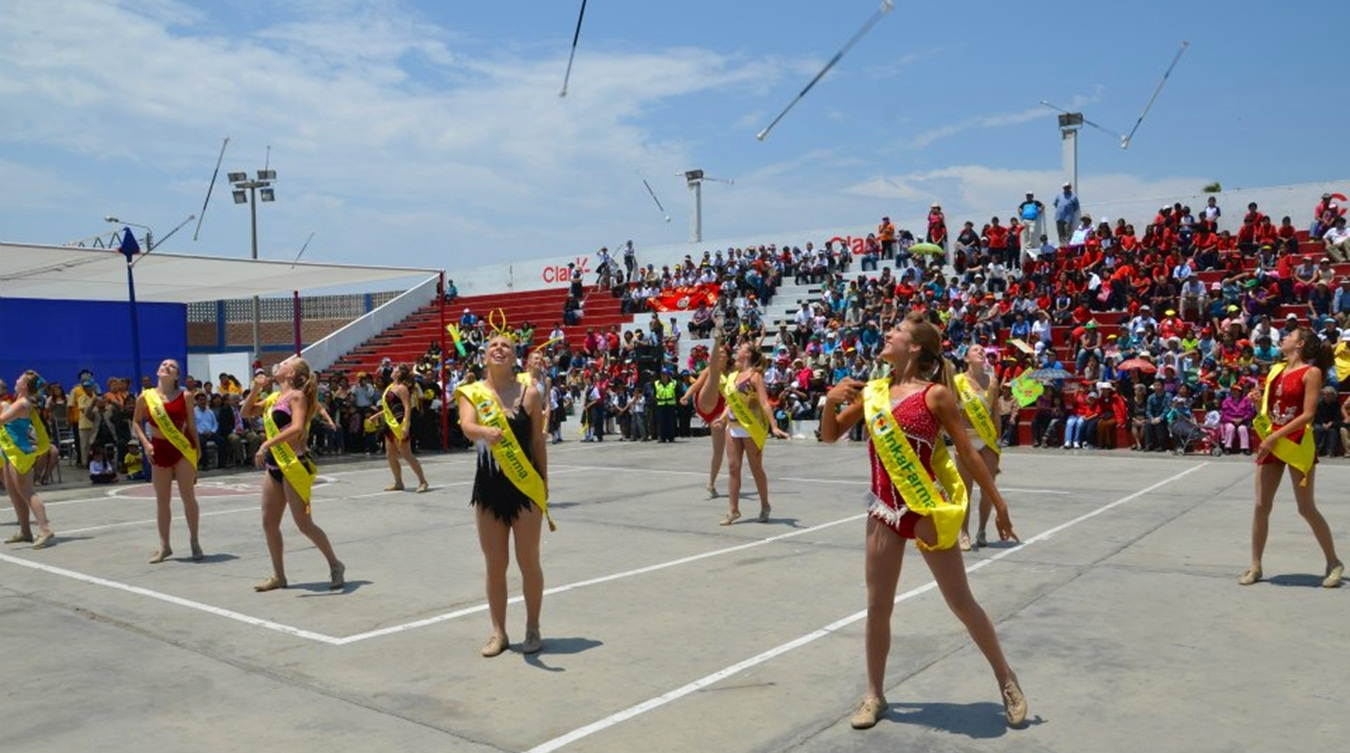
Guaripolas in a show

== Peruvian paso in spring ==
During Trujillo spring festival in September and October there is a Peruvian Paso contest. Trujillo is known and considered as the Cradle of the typical Peruvian Paso Horse as well as the Capital of Culture of Peru so as the Capital of the Marinera dance and as the city of the everlasting spring.

Peruvian paso
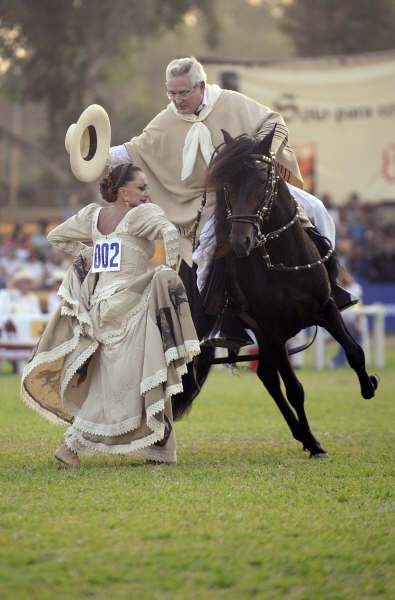
Peruvian paso dancing marinera.

== Queens of Trujillo Spring festival ==
N°	Queen of festival	Year
1	Lilli Clarke Cabada	1951
2	Lucila Grijalba Yturri	1952
3	Janeth Barriga Bringas	1954
4	Teresa Pinillos Ganoza	1956
5	Rocío de la Riva Rossi	1958
6	Victoria Pinillos Monteverde	1959
7	Cecilia Manucci Vega	1961
8	Daisi Ganoza Birrel	1967
9	María Antonieta De Orbegoso Alvarado	1968
10	Mónica Ponce de León	1969
11	Ana María Hoyle Montalva	1971
12	Hortencia Rey Ganoza	1973
13	Yela Nestorovic Razzeto	1974
14	Sarita Bickel Vargas	1975
15	Jeanete Sánchez Ferrer Barriga	1976
16	Lía Iturri Cano	1977
17	Patricia Casuso Cubas	1981
18	María del Carmen Ganoza Delfín	1983
19	Ana Cecilia Morillas Abad	1988
20	Catherine Deheza Vásquez	1999
21	María Florencia de Orbegoso Piedra	1997
22	Lorena Mantilla	2010
23	Estrella Delgado Parker Vanini	2012

== See also ==
- Trujillo Marinera Festival
- San Jose Festival
- International Festival of Lyric Singing
- Santiago de Huamán
- Victor Larco Herrera District
- Historic Centre of Trujillo
- Trujillo Book Festival
