= Pacasmayo District =

Pacasmayo
- District
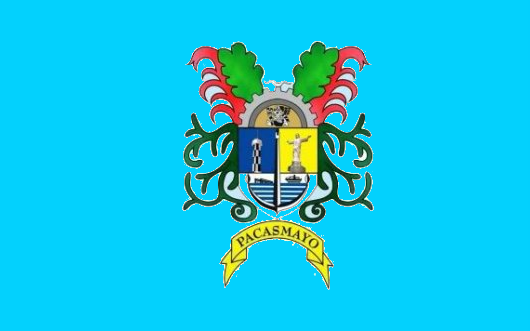
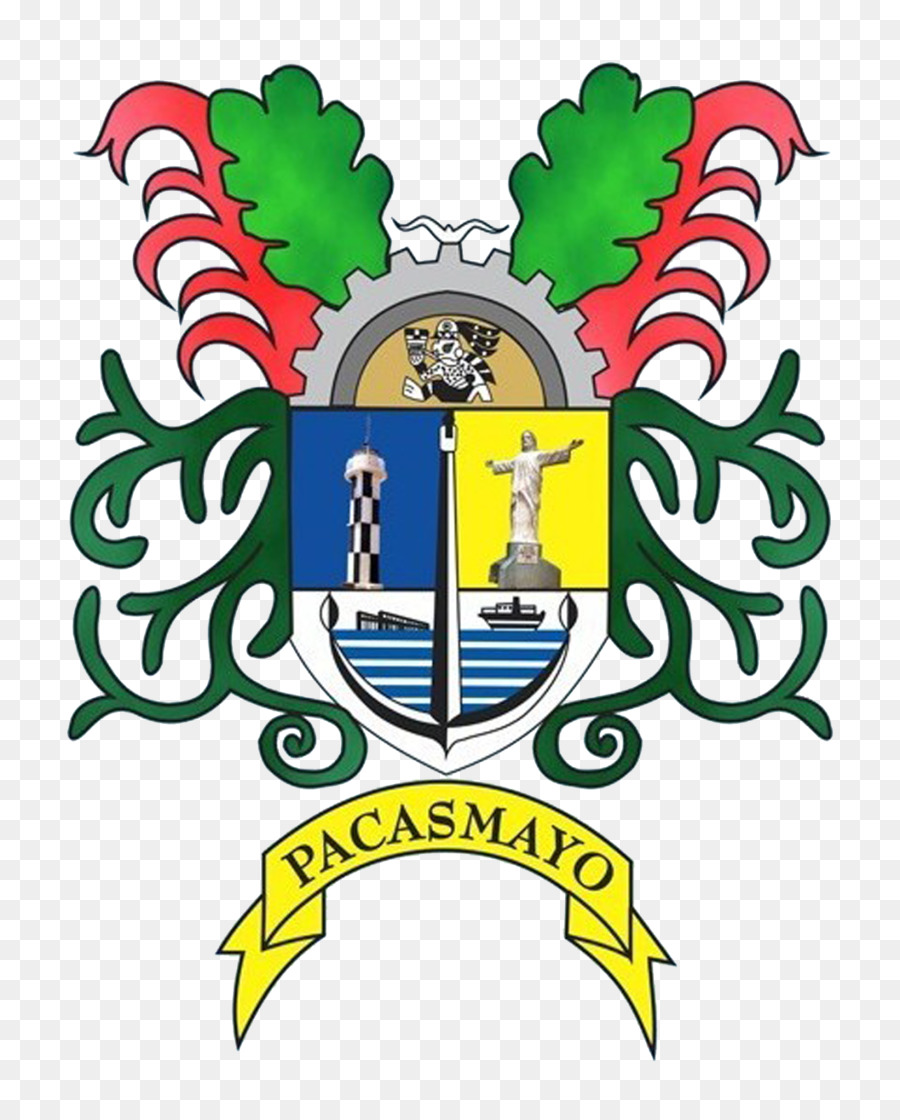
- Flag Coat of arms
- Interactive map of Pacasmayo
- Coordinates: 7°24′1″S 79°34′12″W
- Country: Peru
- Region: La Libertad
- Province: Pacasmayo
- Founded: November 23, 1864
- Capital: Pacasmayo

Government
  - Mayor: Cesar Rodolfo Milla Manay

Area
  - Total: 30.84 km^{2} (11.91 sq mi)
- Elevation: 8 m (26 ft)

Population (2017)
  - Total: 28,959
  - Density: 939.0/km^{2} (2,432/sq mi)
- Time zone: UTC-5 (PET)
- UBIGEO: 130704

Pacasmayo District is one of five districts of the province Pacasmayo in Peru. It lies just over 100 km north of Trujillo, in km number 681 from the Panamerican Highway, is located in the coast beside to the Pacific Ocean. The city is visited commonly for surfers.
