= Trujillo Marinera Festival =

Annual cultural event in Trujillo, Peru no longer exists

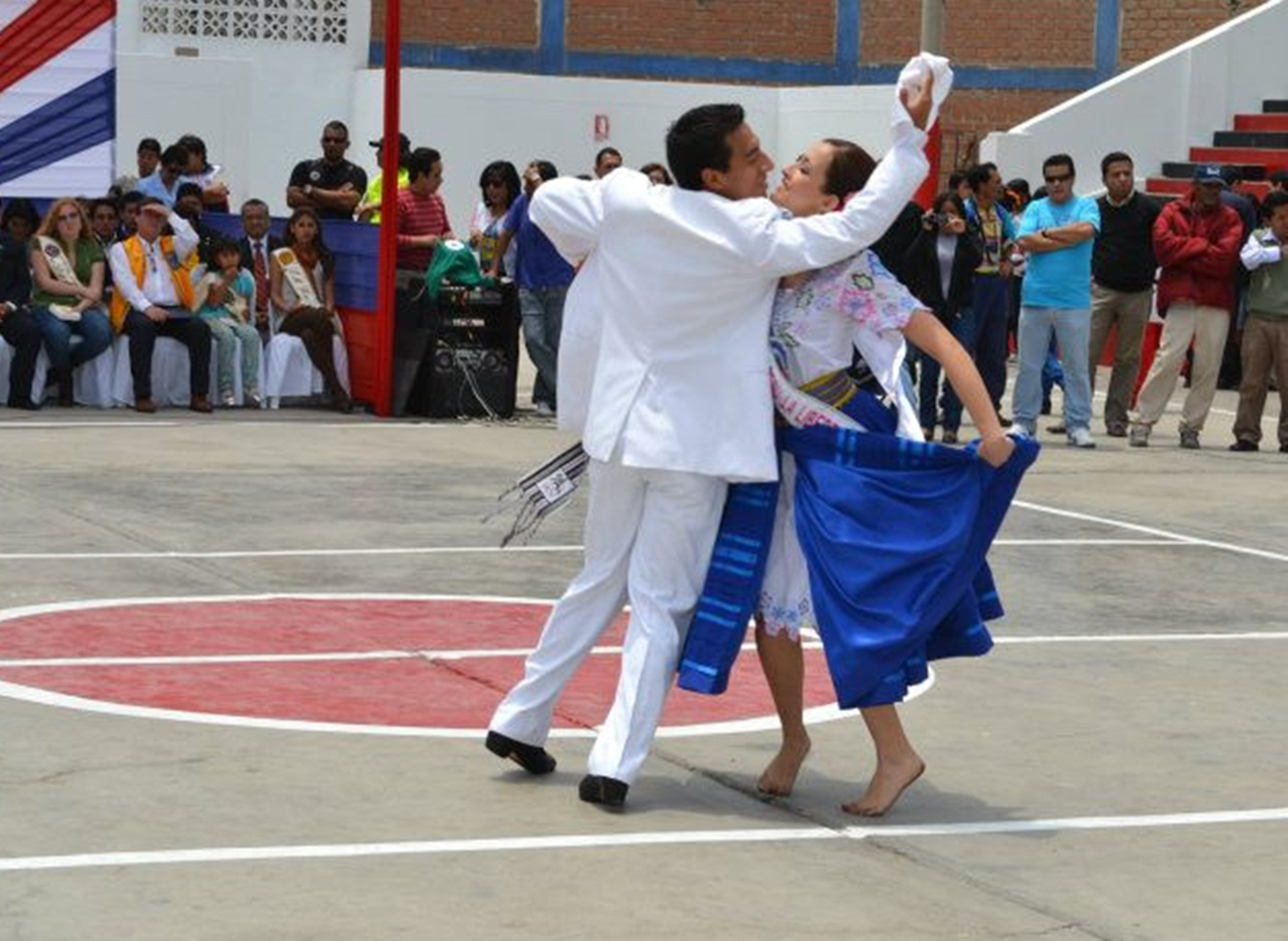
- Marinera dancers
- Genre: Costumbrist Festival
- Begins: January
- Ends: January
- Frequency: annual
- Locations: Trujillo city, Perú
- Years active: 1960 - present
- Most recent: 64th edition (2024)
- Attendance: 20,000 (estimated)

Trujillo Marinera Festival is a Peruvian cultural event held annually in Trujillo city in January. The event focuses on a dance contest called the marinera, a typical dance of the city and of the country. The festival also presents parades, presentations and competitions of Peruvian paso horses. Both the marinera dance and the Peruvian paso horse have been declared to be part of the cultural heritage of the nation by the Peruvian government. This festival is one of the most important cultural events and representative of the country and Trujillo city has been recognized by the Peruvian government as the National Capital Marinera by Law Number 24447, of January 24, 1986.

== Description ==
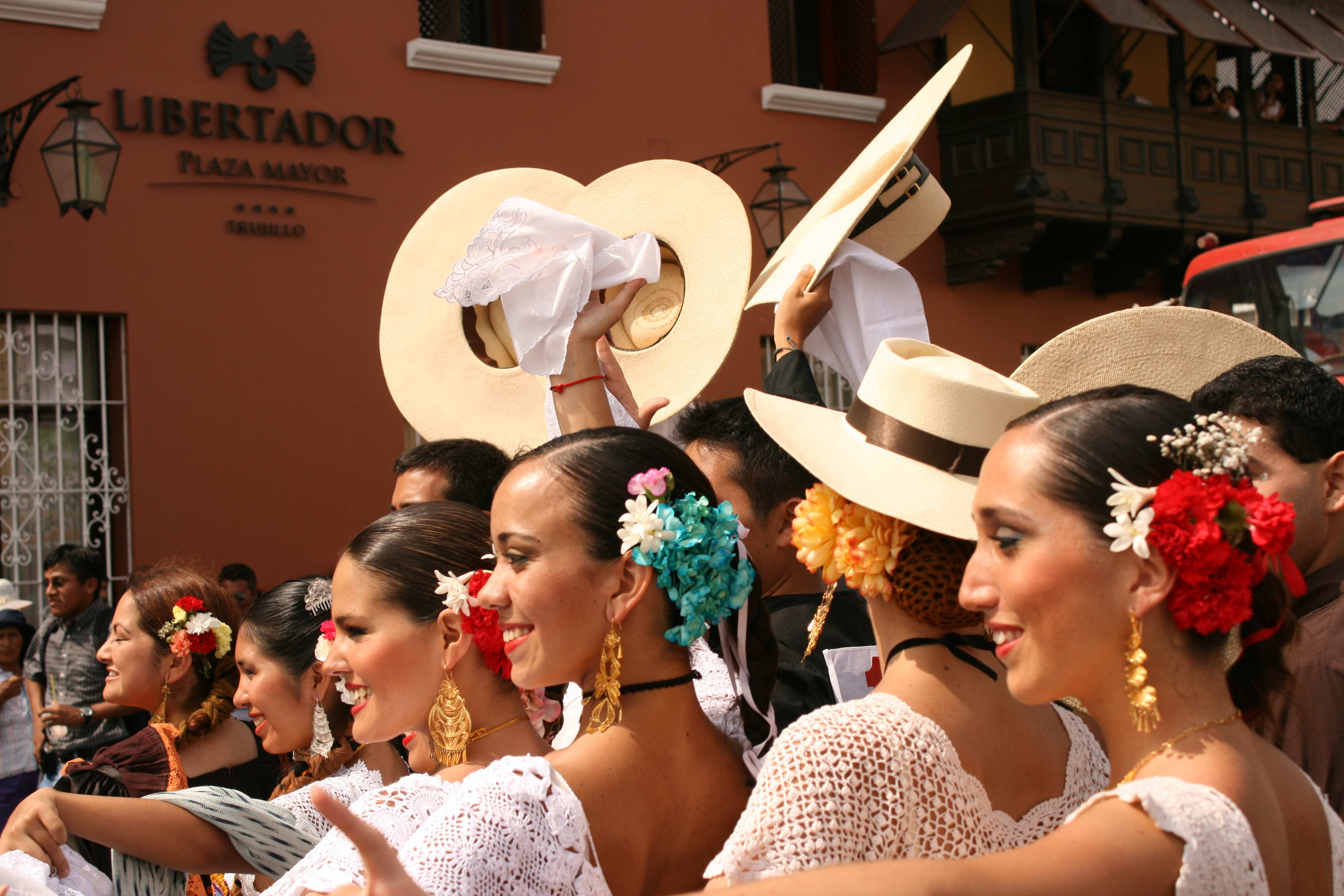
Female Marinera dancers, in Trujillo festival held in January of every year

Trujillo is home to the marinera national competition each year. It is a typical dance of the city, organized by the Trujillo Club Libertad and it is performed in the last week of January. Many dance partners from different parts of the country and foreign guests come to the contest every year to compete in the categories of the competition. The festival draws thousands of tourists from around the world. It also highlights the corso through the main streets of the Historic Centre that ends in main Square of Trujillo and the presentation of the typical Peruvian paso in the city. The festival begins with the presentation of the Queen that represents the Marinera Festival. There are then several cultural events for those attending the festival.

== Events ==
=== Marinera contest ===
The National Marinera Contest is held every year during the month of January, in the city of Trujillo. Presented pairs of dancers from around the country compete in different categories. Dances are accompanied by bands of musicians in the city. The Marinera is a traditional Peruvian dance named in honor of the country's navy ("marinero" is Spanish for "sailor" or "seaman"). One of the most specialized forms of the Marinera involves dancing alongside the Peruvian Paso horse.

=== Parade ===
It takes place in the streets of the Historic Centre of Trujillo. The dancers and queens participate in this parade with cars decorated for the festival. The parade ends in the Plaza de Armas of Trujillo with dances of marinera.

== Characters of the festival ==
The principal characters are:

- Queen of Marinera is the queen of the festival.
- Dance Champions are the best dancers of the before edition and some invited dancers.
- Dancers compete for categories.
- Bands of musicians animate the dances for the competitions.

== Peruvian paso in festival ==
During Trujillo marinera festival in January of every year there is also peruvian paso contest. Trujillo is known and considered as the Cradle of the typical Peruvian Paso Horse as well as the Capital of Culture of Peru so as the Capital of the Marinera dance, which is one of the most important cultural events in the country.

Peruvian paso
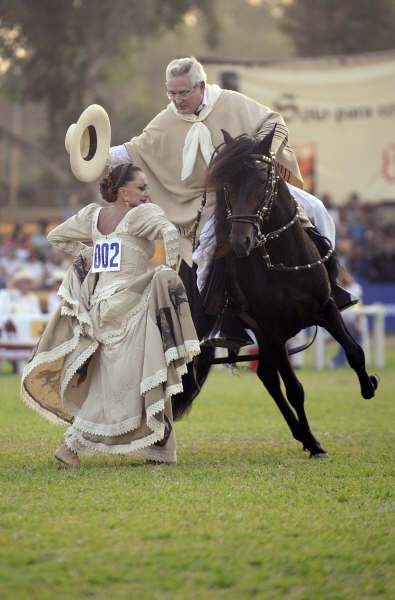
Peruvian paso dancing marinera.

== Gallery ==
Marinera Festival

== Queens of Marinera festival ==
Some of the queens of Marinera Festival are the following:

Year	Queen of festival	Edition
2013	Stephanie Jones Monteverde	53rd
2012	Gabriela Airaldi Doig	52nd

== Winners of marinera dance ==
Some of the winners of Marinera Festival are the following:

Year	Dancers	Edition	Category
2011	Gino Morales; Lizet Castañeda	51st	Champions

== See also ==
- Trujillo Spring Festival
- San Jose Festival
- Trujillo Book Festival
- International Festival of Lyric Singing
- Trujillo
- Santiago de Huamán
- Victor Larco Herrera District
- Guillermo Ganoza Vargas

=== Media ===
- "International Spring Festival in Trujillo" with Victor Calderon on YouTube
- Marinera Festival on YouTube
