= Virú culture =

Virú
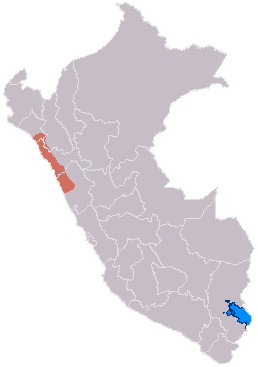
- Map of the Virú culture
- Geographical range: Virú Valley
- Period: Early Intermediate
- Dates: c. 200 BCE - 600 CE
- Preceded by: Chavin culture
- Followed by: Wari culture

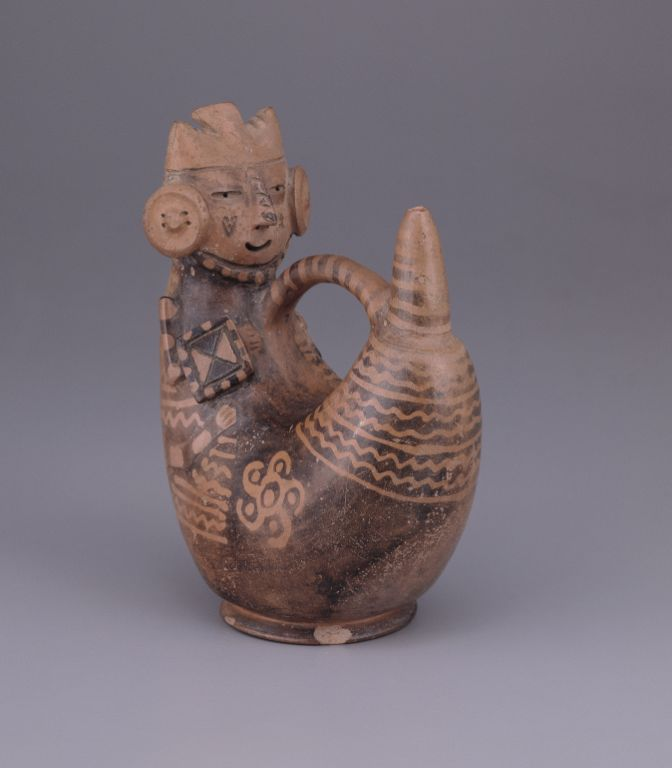
Virú ceramic using negative painting technique. Larco Museum Collection

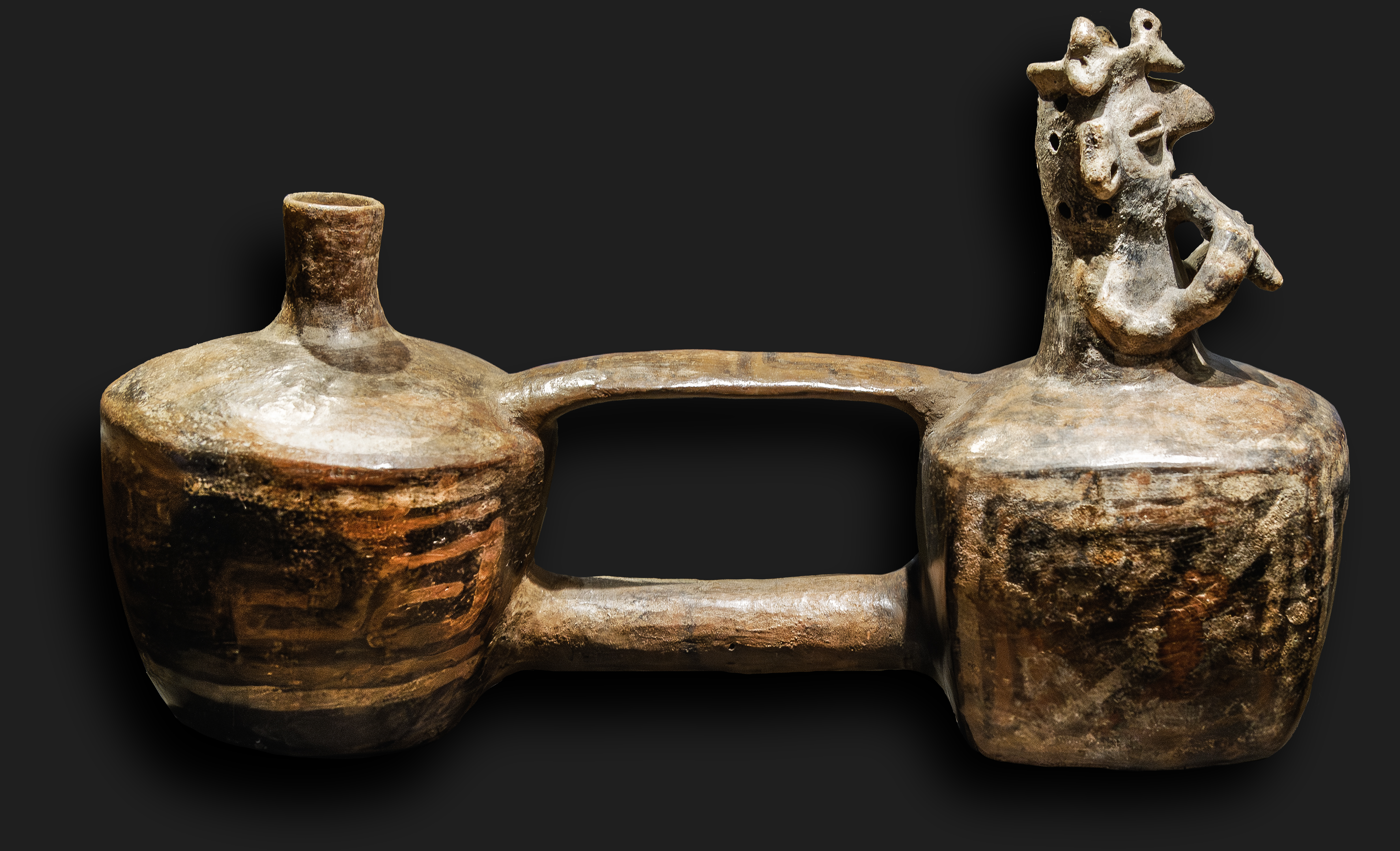
Double-bellied vase with a panpipe player. Musée des Amériques

The Virú culture (alternatively known as the Gallinazo) was a pre-Columbian, pre-Inca culture that flourished in the Virú Valley on the northwest coast of Peru. It marks the start of the Early Intermediate Period of Peru, dating roughly around 200 BCE. This North Coast culture was based in the Virú Valley and extended into the Moche and Santa Valleys as well. The Virú Valley is on a coastal landscape which consists of a narrow land strip boarded by the Andes Mountains to its east and the Pacific Ocean to the west. The capital of the Virú valley during this time period was an urban area called the Gallinazo Group site.

The Gallinazo group site was the primary center of the valley during this time and most likely the seat of regional leadership. The Early Intermediate period in Virú Culture was marked by import social (increase in population size), economic (increase in population size), and political (creations of a unified valley command) transformations. These include an increase in the overall number of settlements in the valley, the extension of the total area under cultivation, the construction of new irrigation canals, and the establishment of four-tiered administrative system.

== Huaca Gallinazo ==
Huaca Gallinazo is the largest mound of the Gallinazo Group in the Virú Valley occupied from as early as the 1st century BCE until as late as the 7th century CE. This space was occupied by a number of architectural compounds. These architectural compounds had a compact network of multiroom residential units with living and storage spaces as well as patios. Also, there were a variety of architectural buildings found, which ranged from modest dwellings to imposing houses with courtyards. Nonresidential building dominated some of the mounds, pointing to the existence of a consolidated power with the mean, resources, and vision to commission monumental projects for civic or ceremonial use.

The largest civic building is located at the core of Huaca Gallinazo. This large structure has in-filled chambers and building columns made of thousands of piled adobes. The columns are leaning against one another but not connected. It is dominated by a towering platform and an adjacent terrace (Southern Terrace) that fronts a wide plaza-presumably used for large public gatherings and ceremonial activities as well.

== Huaca Santa Clara ==
The excavations at Huaca Santa Clara tell us the nature of the relationship between the Moche leaders and the Gallinazo community. This site was originally believed to be a classic Moche settlement but through architectural assessment and ceramic evidence, Huaca Santa Clara was a ‘flourishing’ Gallinazo community. Huaca Santa Clara was a midsized administrative settlement built by members of the Virú polity on the flanks of a small hill that dominates the center of the valley floor. It’s suggested that this site served as an important node in Virú’s valley-wide administrative network because it is the only entry point from the highlands. This is important to the site because the major irrigation canal intakes are located in the highlands near the entry point.

Huaca Santa Clara consists of a series of adobe platforms and multiple terraces, built on the flanks of Cerro Cementerio. There are four large, interconnected adobe buildings: one located on the top of the hill known as the main platform, and one on each of the three terraces. There were hundreds of fragments of decorative war maces found around the base of the main platform. These architectural ornaments are well known in the art of both Gallinazo and Moche cultures, where they adorn the roof of important buildings. The maces were exclusive to this region of the site so their use was restricted to the top of the structure.

Access to Huaca Santa Clara from the valley was only possible through one of the three lower terraces. Because one of the terraces was preserved well, two adjacent rooms in the southern part of this building were discovered to be a part of a complex access network system. This network seemed to be directing visitors climbing up the hill and into the building. The elite character of this space was marked by the presence of a low bench near a niched wall. Located in the northeast corner was a passage. This passage most likely restricted access to many private areas. One example is a room found near by that had a large gallery with a veranda-like design with a panoramic view of the valley neck. This room could be interpreted as a visual control of the eastern region of the hill and therefore shown as a type of power. There were large-scale storage facilities for agricultural products found in Huaca Santa Clara as well. These large facilities are closely associated with elite residences as well as the elite burials inside the architectural complex.

It is commonly believed that the Moche had conquered the Virú Valley, replacing local leaders with their own leaders. There isn’t any evidence of this at the site. The elite at Huaca Sana Clara maintained their authority over the land, people, and most importantly, the site throughout the Early Intermediate Period. Even though there wasn’t a direct power shift, the Moche maintained an in-direct control over Huaca Santa Clara. This is shown through the presence of Moche artifacts inside the elite compounds mentioned earlier. The relationship between these two powerful, dominant, and elite societies was not ‘balanced’ but no one knows for sure how the Moche secured this site into complete control by 700 CE.

== See also ==
- Moche culture
