= Marcahuamachuco =

Archaeological site in Peru

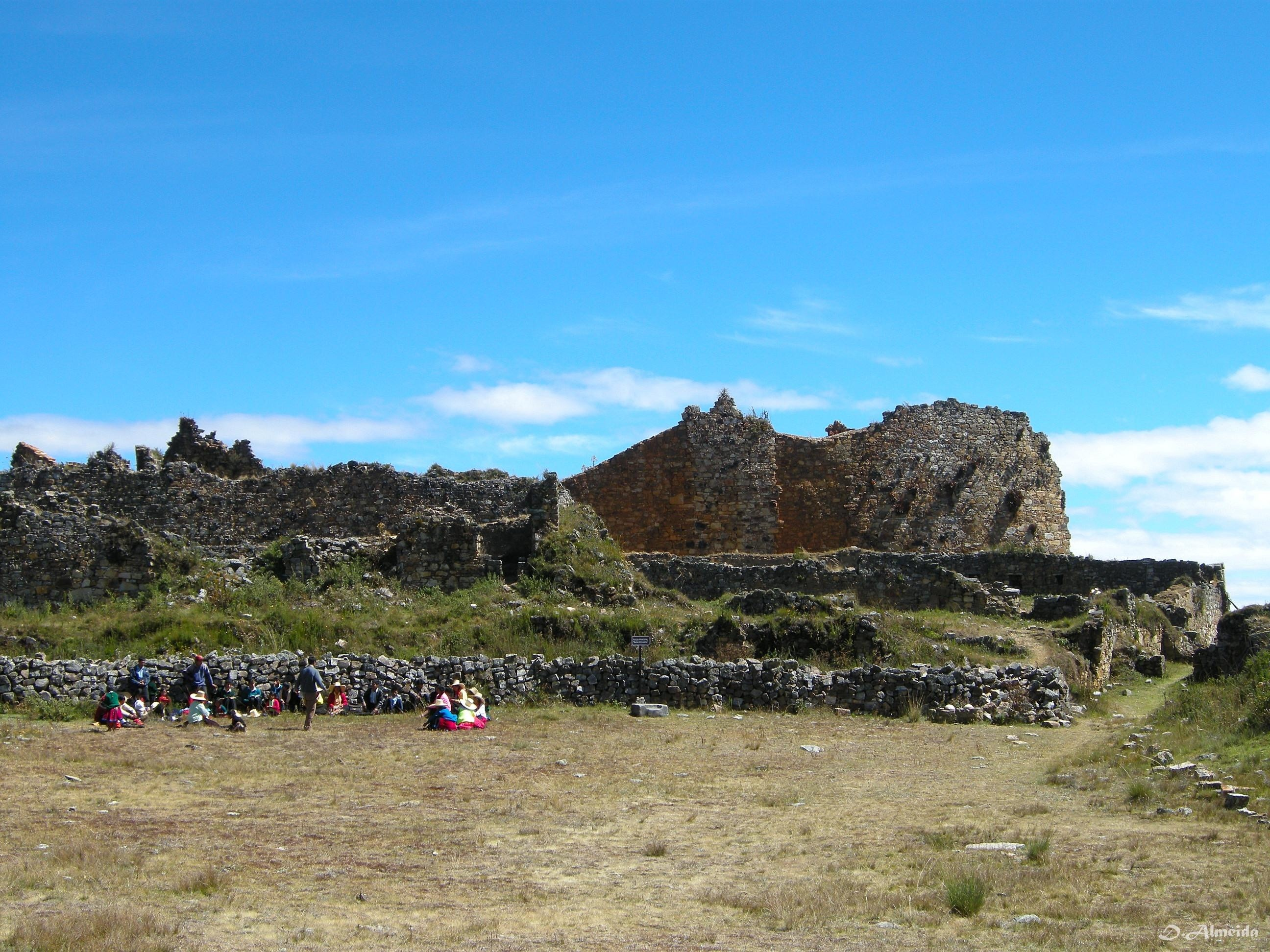
- Marcahuamachuco- Plaza Principal (Sector El Castillo), Huamachuco

- Map showing location of the Marcahuamachuco's Inca ruins in Peru
- Interactive map of Marcahuamachuco
- 7.7853°S 78.0783°W
- Cultures: Pre-Incan
- Location: La Libertad Region, Peru

History
- Built: 15th century

Marcahuamachuco is an archeological site of Pre-Incan ruins in the La Libertad Region of Peru. Although less well-known than other sites, it is considered significant and has been referred to by archaeologists as "Machu Picchu of the North" and "The Jewel of La Libertad."

== History ==
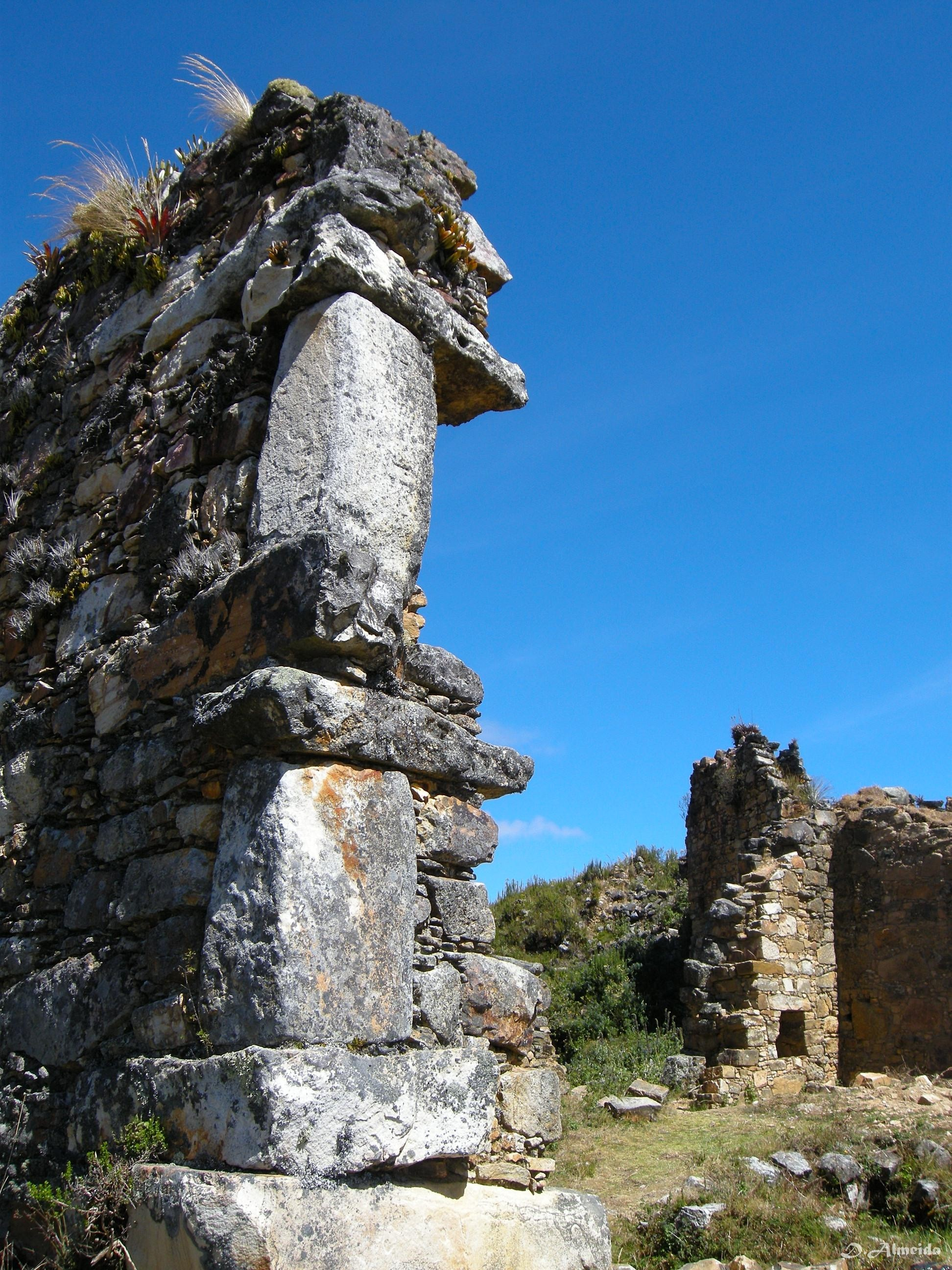
Marcahuamachuco, Muros del Castillo

Construction of Marcahuamachuco began around AD 400, during the Andean Middle Horizon period and continued until approximately 800 AD. This was well before the Wari culture and the later imperial expansion of the Incas. Before being conquered by the Incas in the 14th century, Marcahuamachuco was known as northern Peru's most important political, economic and military center.

Researchers believed that the site as an oracle center, and for religious and political ceremonies. In the later stages of the culture, it was used as a burial site for the elite. Its influence extended through much of northern Peru and contemporary southern Ecuador. This importance may have been related to trade with its neighbors between AD 650 and 700, the Mochica to the west, the Recuay culture to the south, Cajamarca in the north and lesser-known cultures of the Maranon.

Built defensively on top of an isolated highland mesa that is 5 kilometers long and 500 meters wide, with a vast view of the surroundings, Marcahuamachuco contains several major compounds. These were surrounded by curved stone walls as high as 12 meters. The remains of inner galleries, rooms and plazas suggest administrative and ceremonial functions. During the later Middle Period (AD 700–900) followed into the Intermediate Late Horizon (until around 1200), archaeological evidence suggests that human burials were made within the walls. These contributed to the ceremonial functions of the site.

Marcahuamachuco probably had oracles, who attracted people from the northern Andes, the areas that today comprise Peru and Ecuador. The cult was probably related to deities, an old cult to Ataujo, and a more recent cult to Catequil. Marcahuamachuco became a prominent center at the same time that the Wari in southern Peru culture flourished (AD 400 – 1100). The site was likely abandoned in the 15th century.

The latest investigations of the site by researchers John and Theresa Lange Topic (1991) suggested that occupation may have been seasonal, with a maximum population of 6,000. Their estimate is based upon the quantity of arable land and water availability.

== Investigations ==
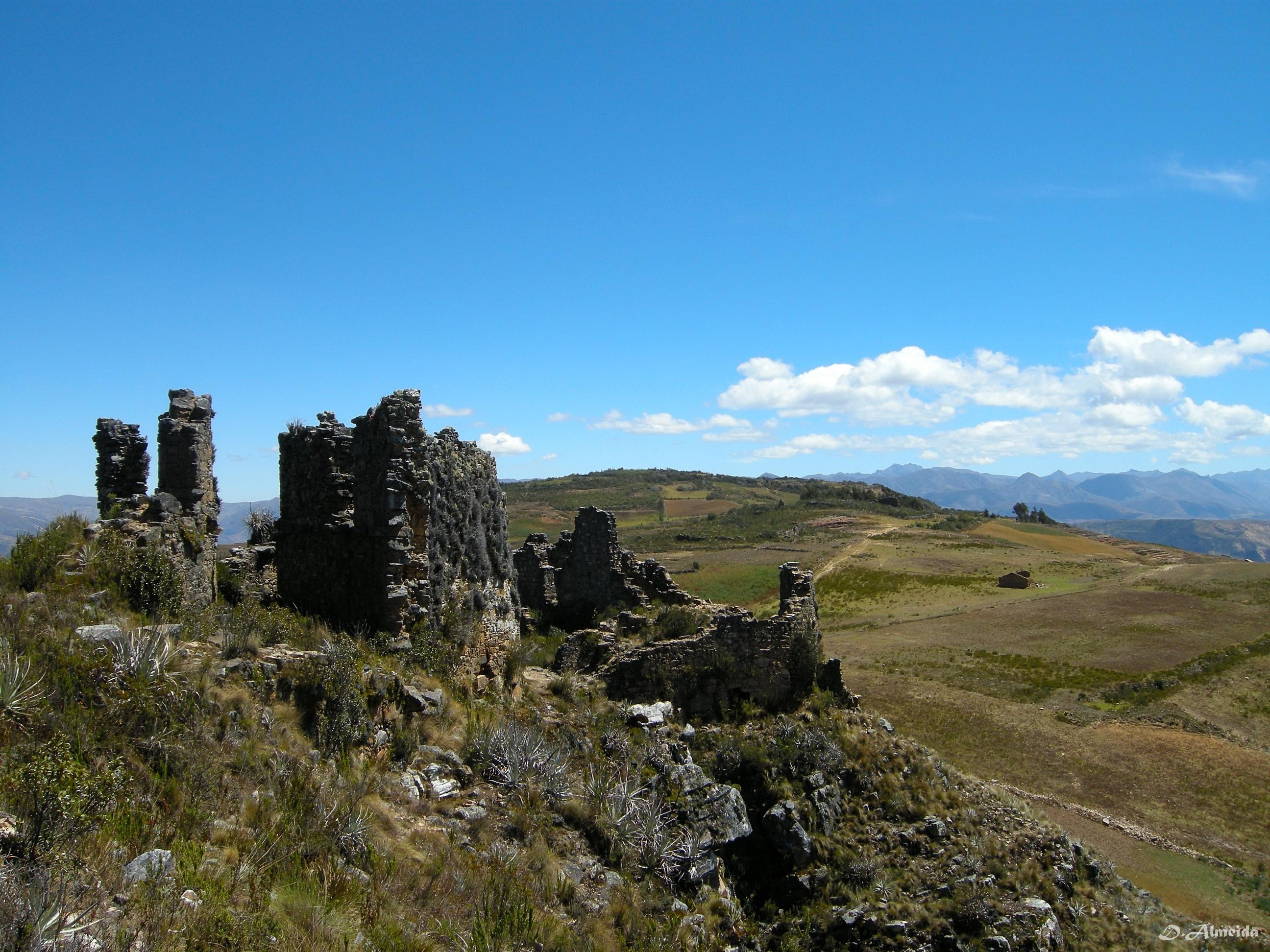
Marcahuamachuco-(Sector Las Monjas)

One of the earliest sketch maps on Marcahuamachuco comes from the 18th-century document prepared by Bishop Baltazar Jaime Martinez Compañón. Early descriptions and drawings from the late 19th century were done by European travelers, as the field of archeology was developing professionally. Charles Wiener in 1880 published the first topographical description of Marcahuamachuco and named its principal compounds. Ernst Middendorf visited Marcahuamachuco in 1887, describing its principal compounds and comparing the site to Kuelap.

The first formal archaeological research in Marcahuamachuco was conducted during three months in 1900 by Max Uhle and Julio C. Tello under the auspices of the University of California, Berkeley (UC). Uhle photographed the site and corrected the previous maps prepared by Wiener. His research was followed in 1941-42 by Theodore McCown of UC. In addition to reviewing Uhle's writings and collected specimens stored at the University's Museum of Anthropology, during two years of field work McCown excavated between the monumental galleries. His publication described the site in more detail, and he drew more precise and elaborate maps of the archaeological site, and presented a chronological sequence to explain the cultural development of Marcahuamachuco.

In 1944 archaeologist Hans Horkheimer published photographs from Marcahuamachuco, which showed stone heads similar to those of Chavin. John Thatcher, a student of McCown, continued with research in the site during 1968-69 and 1973–74. He worked to establish its cultural phases and chronologies on the basis of ceramic styles.

The Huamachuco Archaeological Project, supported by a Canadian team, has been dedicated since 1981 to study the prehistory of the area. Its researchers have collected data and drawn conclusions about the site and its history.

== The Site ==
Marcahuamachuco is set atop the nexus of three mountain valleys at an altitude of more than 3,200 meters (10,000 feet). Encompassing more than three kilometres of land, the site is celebrated for its massive castillos and unique circular double-walled archaeological structures. Over many centuries, however, the ruins have been degraded by natural elements, and today face accelerating threats from grazing livestock, plant growth, lack of conservation and surveillance, and the continued effects of natural elements and weather. The site's location, in the northern Peruvian highlands of La Libertad, was until recently a difficult to access place. Today a new road makes it accessible on three and a half hours ride from the city of Trujillo, the third largest on the country's Pacific coast, and location of major Moche heritage sites.

The domestic residences are multi-storied galleries which originally housed numerous individual families.

== Conservation ==
The massiveness and monumentality of the Marcahuamachuco complex reveals the importance of its constructions and their function, a factor that has moved the Peruvian Government to support the conservation of this immense archaeological site by recently establishing funding for a major project for conservation of what visitors have denominated “The Machu Picchu of the North”. More recently the Minister of Culture Juan Ossio denotes the importance of the site and names Marcahuamachuco, Wanuku Pampa and Kuelap as the major archaeological tourist destinations, at equal level to Machu Picchu.

In May 2011, Global Heritage Fund (GHF) announced that it will provide funding and technical expertise for a conservation at Marcahuamachuco.
