= Week anniversary of Trujillo Municipality =

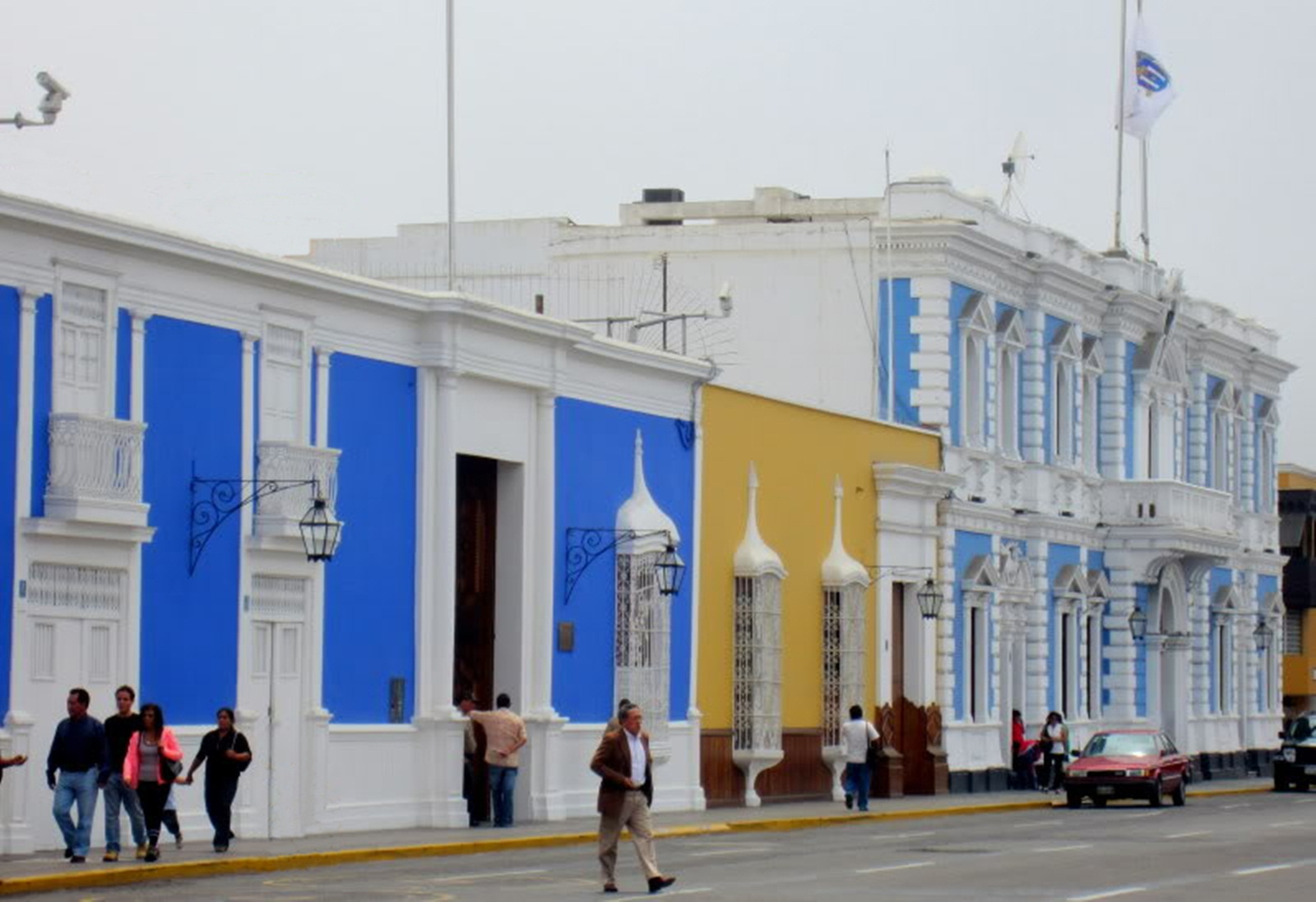
- Municipality of Trujillo in the Main Square
- Genre: Civic celebration
- Location: Trujillo city
- Years active: 2010 - present
- Website: http://www.munitrujillo.gob.pe

The Week anniversary of Trujillo Municipality also called Trujillo Jubilee Week is a celebration held the first week of March in the Peruvian city of Trujillo. This week of celebration has as central day on March 5 of every year in commemoration to the installation of the first cabildo in the city made in 1535 by Francisco Pizarro. In this week of celebration are presented several acts and festivals in the city. In the last edition of this anniversary week took place the Trujillo Book Festival held in the traditional Plazuela El Recreo.

== Events ==
The celebration includes some ceremonies and events like the following:

- Craft Fair.
- Trujillo Book Festival.
- Artistic Parade
- Contest of typical dishes
- Hoisting to the flag of the city
- Night of folk gala
- Ballet Gala in the Municipal Theatre
- Artistic and cultural Night, held in the main square.

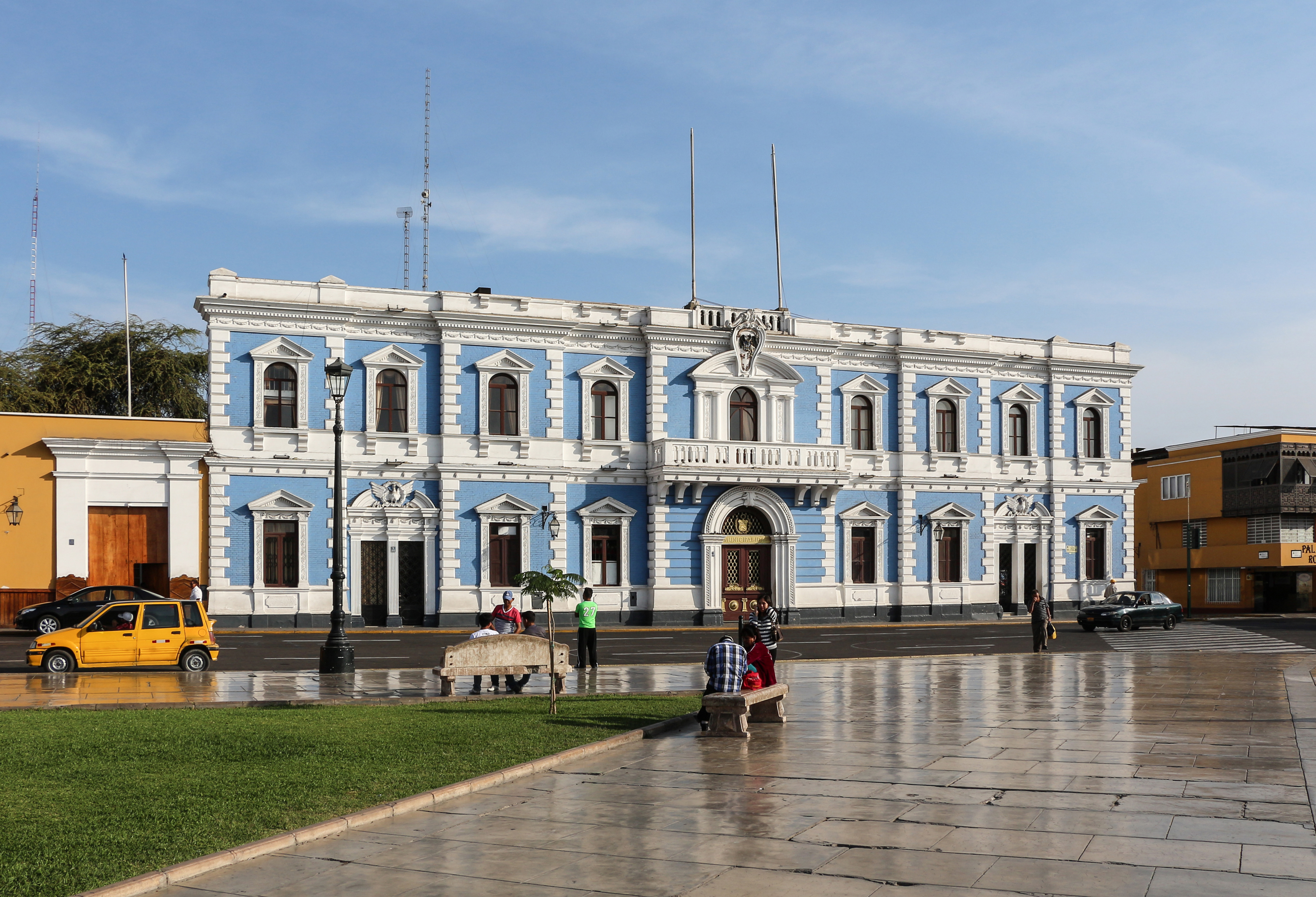
View of The Municipal Palace of Trujillo in the Plaza de Armas of the city located in its Historic Centre, on December 29, 1820 the independence of Trujillo was proclaimed by the Marquis of Torre Tagle. In honour to the city the Freedom Monument was made by sculptor Edmund Moeller.

== See also ==
- Municipality of Trujillo
- Trujillo
- Marinera Festival
- Trujillo Spring Festival
- Las Delicias beach
- Huanchaco
- Santiago de Huamán
- Victor Larco Herrera District
