= Foundation of Trujillo, Peru =

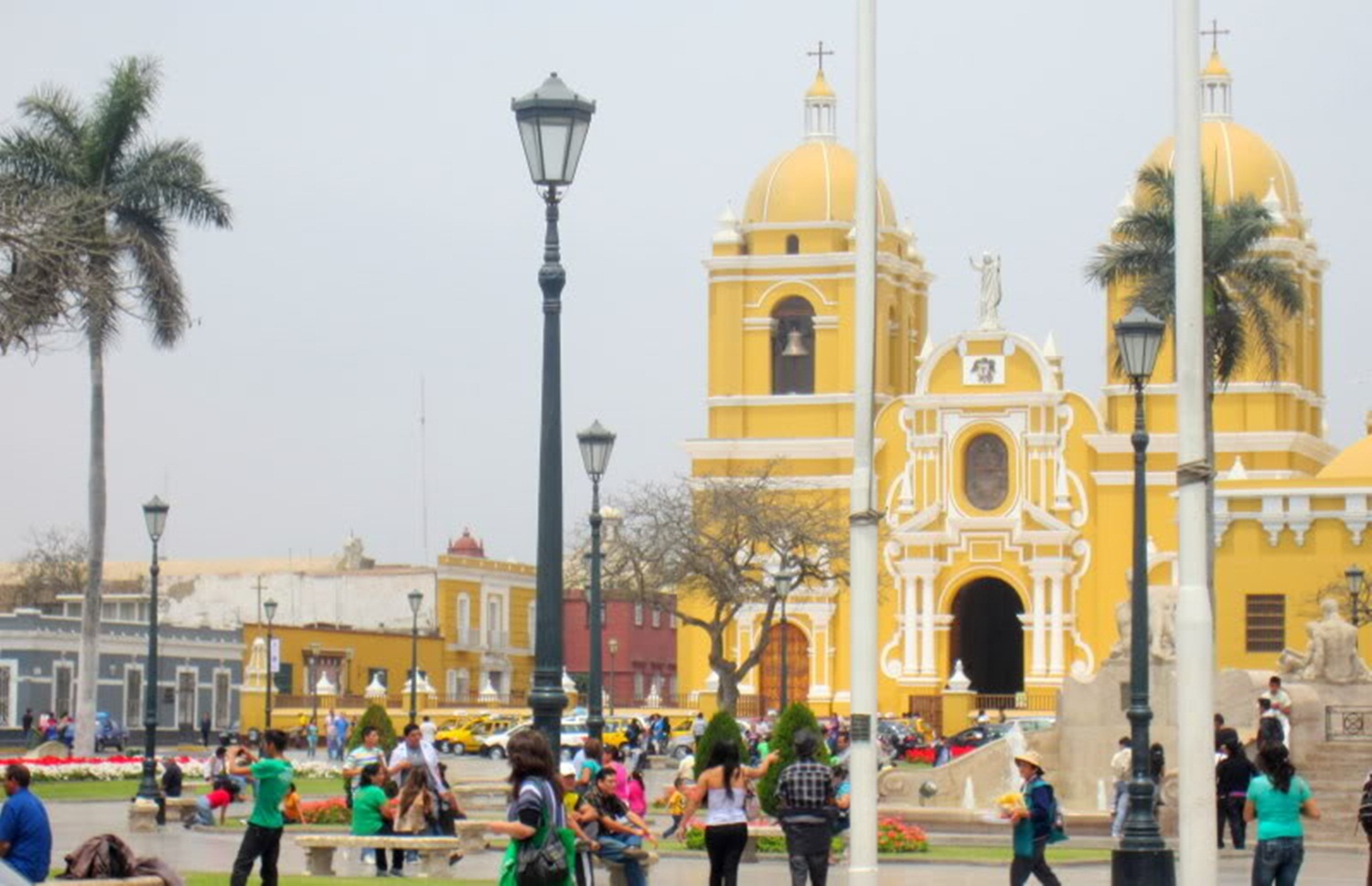
In the Plaza de Armas of the city was made the Spanish foundation of Trujillo in northern Peru

The Foundation of Trujillo is an example of Spanish colonial expansion that took place in the area known today as the Valley of Moche in northern Peru. The exact date of Trujillo's foundation is still in dispute; according to historian Napoleón Cieza Burga it is November 1534.

== Pre-Columbian cultures ==
A variety of native peoples lived in the Valley of Moche before the Spanish colonization. The Moche people were assimilated by the Chimu, who in turn were assimilated by the Inca, who were ultimately conquered by the Spanish. The Spanish conquistadors arrived in the area of what is today the city of Huanchaco, and found it inhabited by the indigenous people who worked as fishermen.

== Spanish foundation ==
Trujillo was one of the first cities in the Americas to be founded by the Spanish conquistadors. It fell within the Viceroyalty of Peru, and was established among four Chimu settlements, Huanchaco, Huamán, Moche and Mampuesto. This was done to create an alliance against the Incas. On November 23, 1537, King Charles I of Spain gave the town the rank of "city" and the coat of arms that remains the city's symbol. This made Trujillo the first city in Peru to receive a coat of arms from a Spanish monarch.

=== Versions of Foundation Date ===
Some of the suggested dates for the founding of Trujillo city are:

- November 1534 by the Spanish conquistador, Diego de Almagro, who founded the first Spanish settlement in Moche Valley, naming it Trujillo of New Castile after the home city of Francisco Pizarro Trujillo of Extremadura. This is supported by historian Napoleon Cieza Burga.
- December 6, 1534 by Diego de Almagro
- March 5, 1535 by Francisco Pizarro, This date is supported by historian Raúl Porras Barrenechea. On this date, the first Cabildo of Trujillo city was installed. Since 2010, it has been celebrated as the Week Anniversary of Trujillo Municipality, in commemoration of that event.

== See also ==
- Historic Centre of Trujillo
- Chan Chan
- Huanchaco
- Puerto Chicama
- Chimu
- Pacasmayo beach
- Plaza de Armas of Trujillo
- Moche
- Víctor Larco Herrera District
- Vista Alegre
- Buenos Aires
- Las Delicias beach
- Independence of Trujillo
- Wall of Trujillo
- Santiago de Huamán
- Lake Conache
- Marinera Festival
- Trujillo Spring Festival
- Wetlands of Huanchaco
- Association of Breeders and Owners of Paso Horses in La Libertad
- Salaverry beach
- Puerto Morín
- Virú culture
- Marcahuamachuco
- Wiracochapampa
