= Paseo Pizarro =

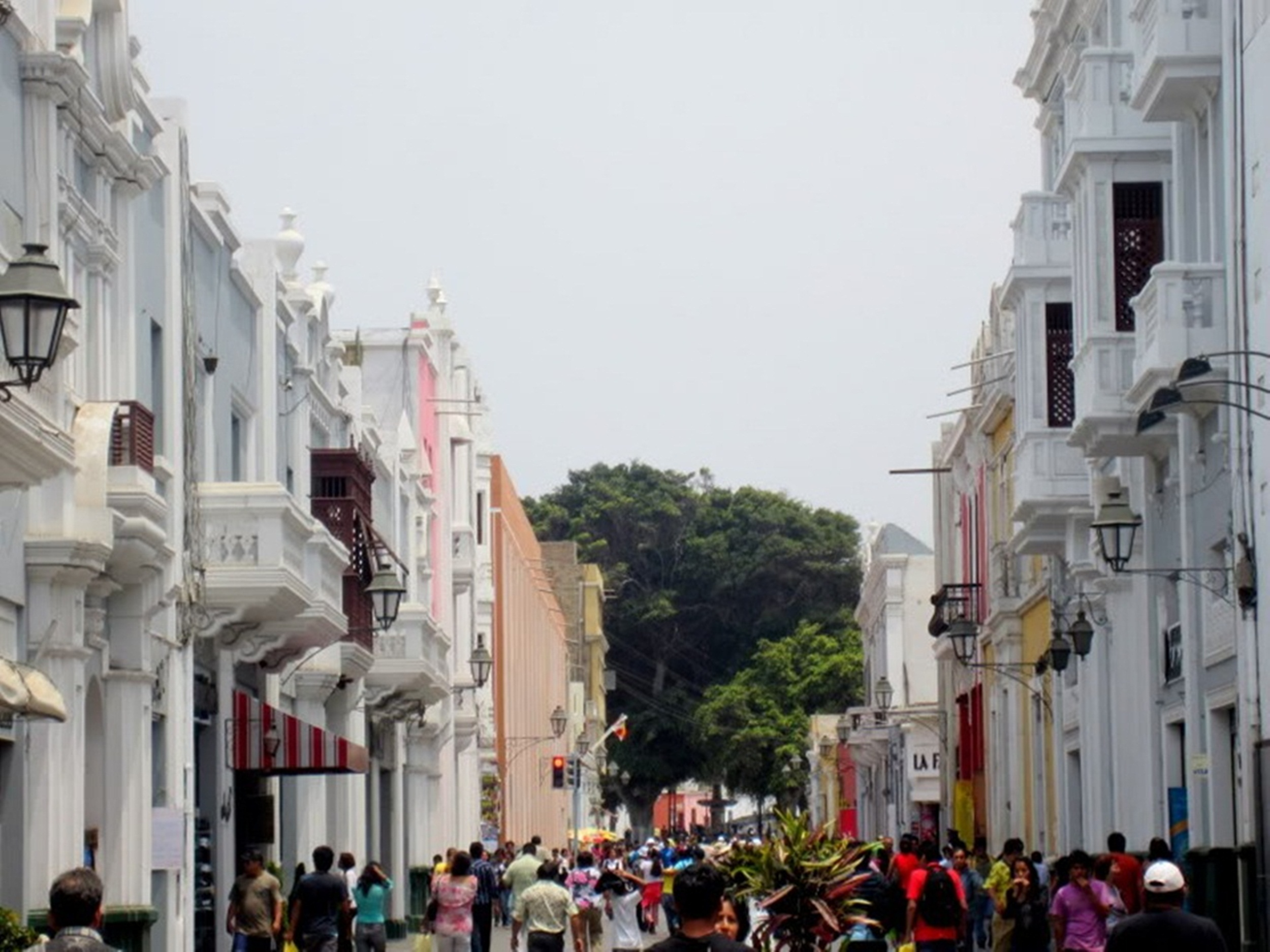
Colonial and republican architecture of the Paseo Pizarro one of the highest-traffic streets in the Historic Centre of Trujillo, at background is the historical and traditional Plazuela El Recreo and its high trees.

Paseo Pizarro is pedestrian walk located on the main street of Trujillo city, in Peru. Pizarro street in blocks 5,6,7 and 8 becomes exclusively a pedestrian and joins the Plaza de Armas with the Plazuela El Recreo, along its four blocks are numerous landmarks like the Palace Iturregui, the Emancipation House, etc. and businesses such as supermarkets, souvenir shops, cafes and bars, etc.

== Description ==
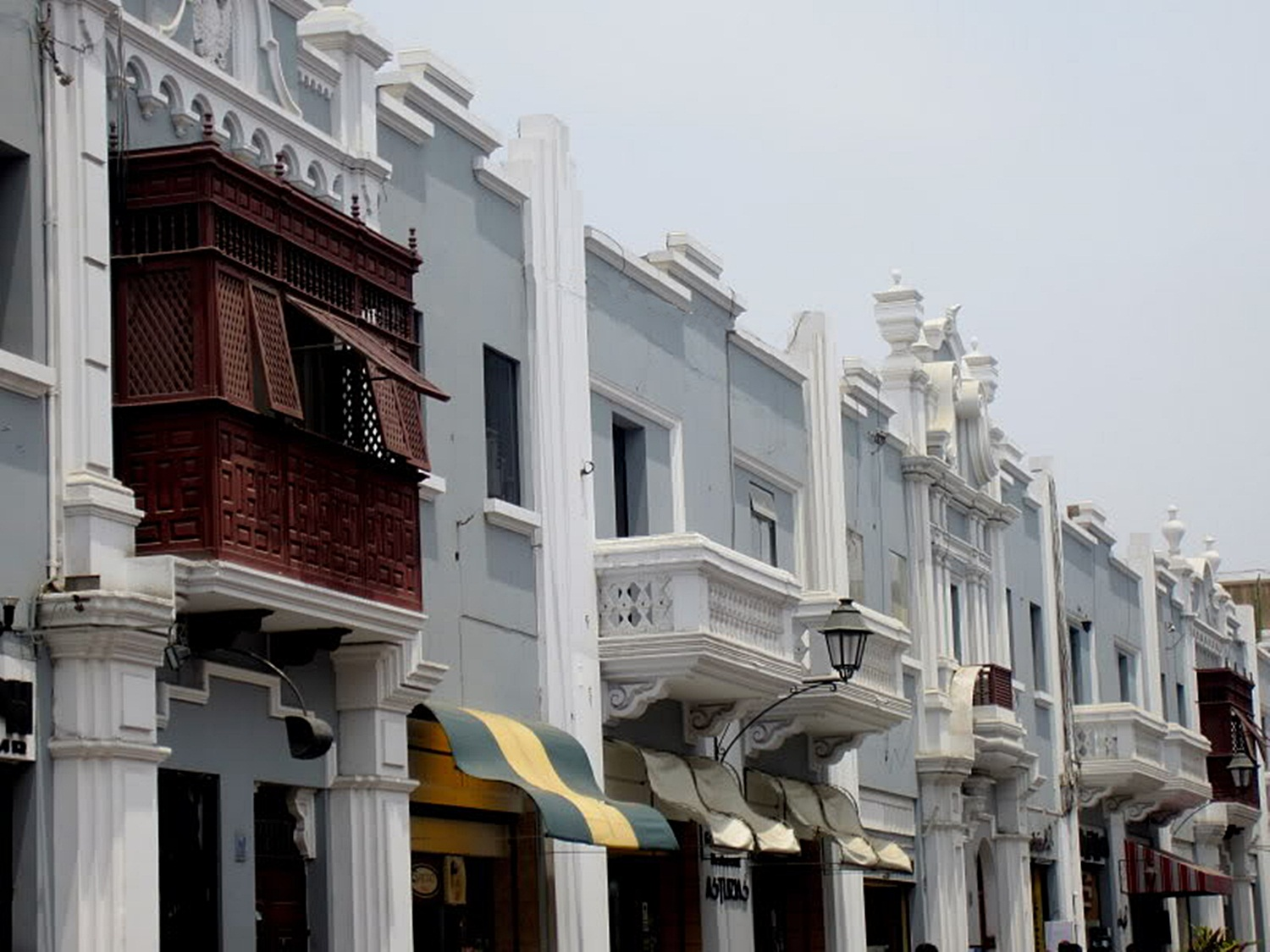
Typical balconies in the Paseo Pizarro

It is located in the Historic Centre of Trujillo 5th block of Pizarro street. In this street of Trujillo's historic centre are also major banks and private and state institutions in the region as the office of the Ombudsman in block 3 and the Reserve Central Bank branch in block 4, among others.

== See also ==
- Historic Centre of Trujillo
- Chan Chan
- Huanchaco
- Puerto Chicama
- Chimu
- Pacasmayo beach
- Plaza de Armas of Trujillo
- Moche
- Víctor Larco Herrera District
- Vista Alegre
- Buenos Aires
- Las Delicias beach
- Independence of Trujillo
- Wall of Trujillo
- Santiago de Huamán
- Lake Conache
- Marinera Festival
- Trujillo Spring Festival
- Wetlands of Huanchaco
- Association of Breeders and Owners of Paso Horses in La Libertad
- Salaverry beach
- Puerto Morín
- Virú culture
- Marcahuamachuco
- Wiracochapampa
