= Independence Day of Trujillo =

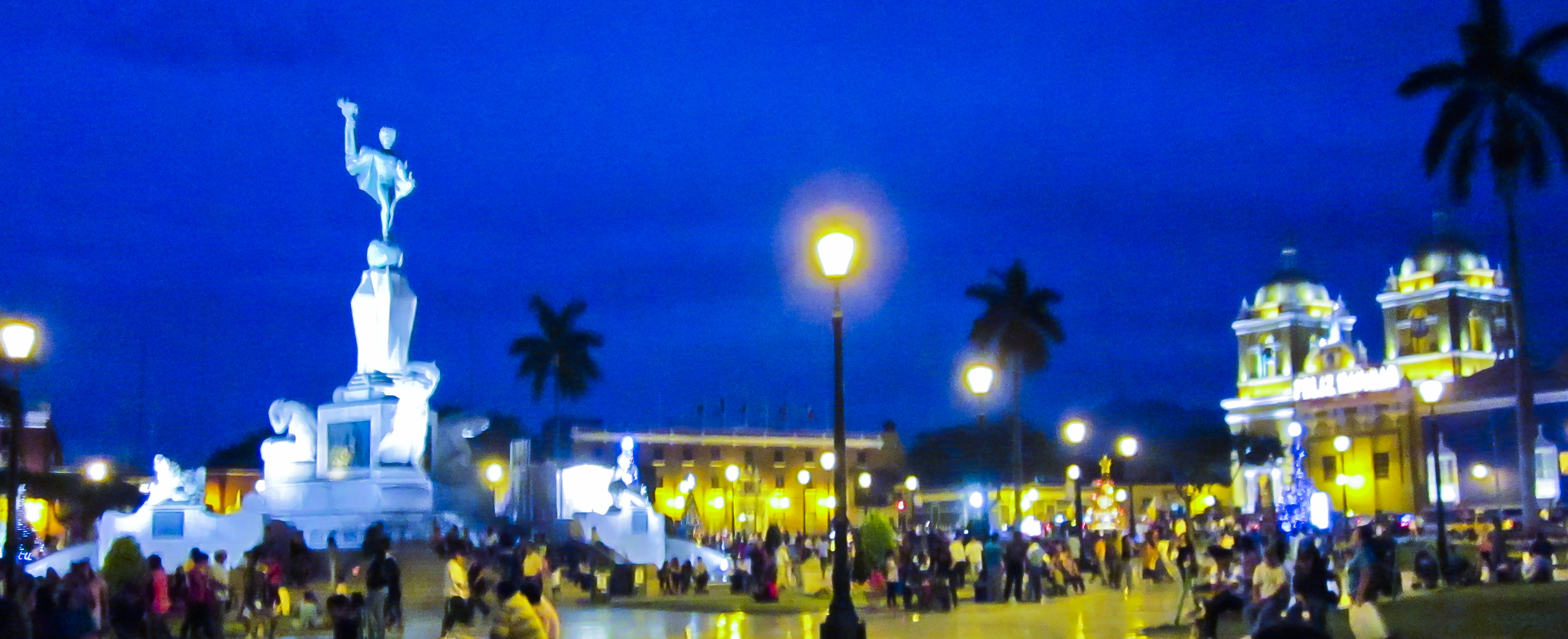
- Trujillo Main Square
- Genre: Civic celebration
- Location: Trujillo city
- Years active: 1820 - present
- Website: http://www.munitrujillo.gob.pe

The Independence Day of Trujillo is a civic celebration held in the Peruvian city of Trujillo. This celebration has as central day in December 29 of every year in commemoration to the proclamation of the Independence of Trujillo that took place in 1820 and it is presented several ceremonies and cultural events in the city. On the commemoration of this civic date it is declared a holiday for the whole province for the festivities of this celebration.

== Description ==
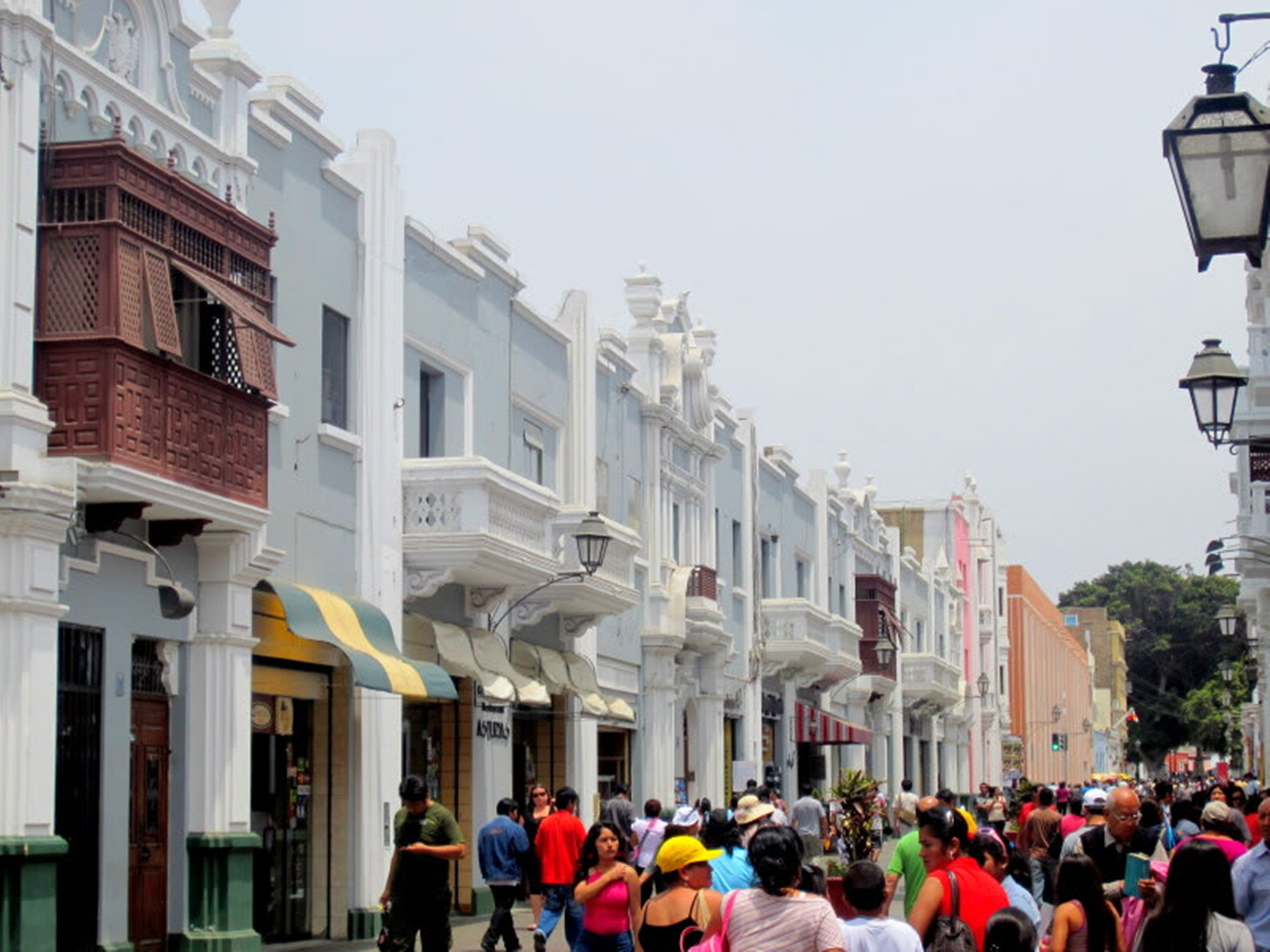
Pedestrian walk Pizarro, In the Historic Centre of Trujillo

The celebration includes some ceremonies and events like the following:

- Formal sitting, chaired by the Mayor of the city.
- Theatre performance, of the proclamation of independence of Trujillo.
- Gala performance, of the Trujillo symphony orchestra at Theatre Municipal.
- Hoisting to the flag of the city
- Civic military parade
- Mass, presided by Archbishop of Trujillo with the participation of authorities and officials of the city.
- Artistic and cultural Night, held in the main square.
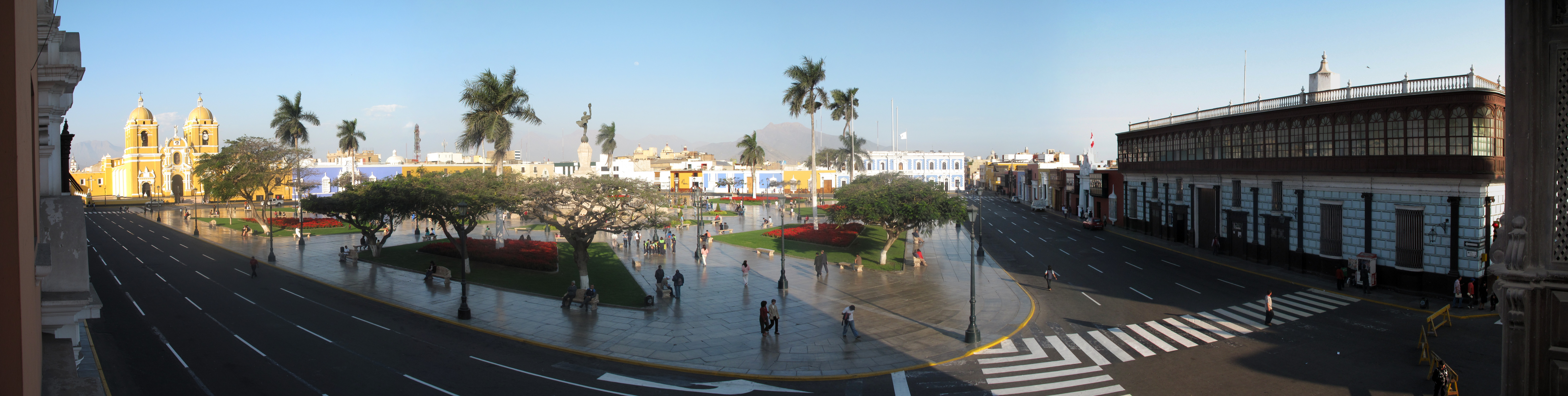
View of Main Square of Trujillo located in the Historic Centre of the city, in this place on December 29, 1820 the independence of Trujillo was proclaimed by the Marquis of Torre Tagle. In honour to the city the Freedom Monument was made by sculptor Edmund Moeller. In this square takes place civic ceremonies of celebration

== See also ==
- Trujillo
- Marinera Festival
- Trujillo Spring Festival
- Las Delicias beach
- Huanchaco
- Santiago de Huamán
- Victor Larco Herrera District
