= Intendancy of Trujillo =

Intendancy of the Spanish Empire

Intendencia de Truxillo
- Intendancy of the Spanish Empire
- 1784–1821
- Coat of arms

- The intendancy within Peru in 1810
- Capital: Trujillo
- Government
- Intendant
  - 1784–1791: Fernando de Saavedra
  - 1791–1820: Vicente Gil de Taboada
  - 1820–1821: José Bernardo de Tagle
- Historical era: Viceroyalty of Peru
  - Established: 1784
  - Independence: 29 December 1820
  - Disestablished: 12 February 1821
- Subdivisions
  - Type: Partidos
  - Units: See relevant section
- Today part of: Present-day Peruvian departments: La Libertad; Lambayeque; Piura; Tumbes; Cajamarca; Amazonas (southern part); San Martín (western part)

The Intendancy of Trujillo (Spanish: Intendencia de Trujillo, formerly Truxillo), also known informally as Trujillo Province (Spanish: Provincia de Trujillo (Truxillo)), was one of the territorial divisions of the Viceroyalty of Peru. This territory was ruled from the city of Trujillo, located in La Libertad Region. It was created in 1784 and lasted until 12 February 1821 when General Jose de San Martin created the Department of Trujillo through the Reglamento Provisional to replace it in the new Republic of Peru.

== Subdivisions ==
The Trujillo Intendancy was divided into the following 7 parts, called "Partidos":

Partido	Head (city of government)
Trujillo	Trujillo
Piura	San Miguel de Piura
Cajamarca	Cajamarca
Chachapoyas	San Juan de la Frontera
Saña and Lambayeque	Lambayeque
Pataz	Pataz
Huamachuco	Huamachuco

== Intendants ==
The Governors (intendants) who ruled the intendance of Trujillo were:

- Fernando de Saavedra (1784–1791)
- Vicente Gil de Taboada (1791–1805; 1810–1820)
- Felipe del Risco (1805–1810, interim)
- José Bernardo de Tagle y Portocarrero (1820–1821)

== Population and Ethnic Composition ==
Ethnic composition of the Intendancy of Trujillo – (Figures by Haenke based on the census of the Viceroyalty of Peru c. 1790)
1. Indigenous 115,647 (49.6%)
2. Mestizos 79,949 (34.3%)
3. Spaniards and Creoles 19,008 (8.15%)
4. Free pardos or people of color 13,757 (5.90%)
5. Enslaved Africans 4,725 (2.03%)

The German naturalist Thaddäus Haenke, who took part in the Malaspina Expedition (1789–1794)—a scientific voyage organized by the Spanish Empire across its dominions—recorded the ethnic and demographic figures in his work Descripción del Perú por Tadeo Haenke ["Description of Peru, by Tadeo Haenke"] (using the terminology of the period) based on the census carried out in the late 18th century in the Viceroyalty of Peru. For each intendancy and its respective partidos, he reported that intendancy of Trujillo included 5 cities, 2 towns, 87 doctrinas, and 142 annexed villages, inhabited by 230,967 people or almas ("souls"). This population comprised 460 clergymen, 160 male religious, and 162 nuns. In ethnic terms, it consisted of 19,008 white Spaniards (Peninsulares and Creoles or Criollos), 115,647 Indians (Native Americans), 79,949 mestizos, 13,757 free people of color or pardos (Afro-Peruvians), and 4,725 enslaved Africans, distributed across the seven partidos of the intendancy.

However, the sum of these categories gives a total of 233,086 people—slightly higher than the reported overall figure—which may reflect errors in compiling or aggregating the data from each partido. Even so, the numbers provide an approximation of society at the time: nearly half of the population was indigenous (49.62%), both in coastal and highland regions; followed by a large mestizo group making up about one-third (34.30%); a small minority of white Spaniards (8.16%), understood as both peninsulares and Creoles, generally concentrated in the main cities, highlands and especially in the Partido of Cajamarca; and finally, a minority of Afro-descendants accounting for nearly one-tenth (7.93%), both free and enslaved, concentrated in the coastal valleys where they worked on the haciendas.

== Independence ==
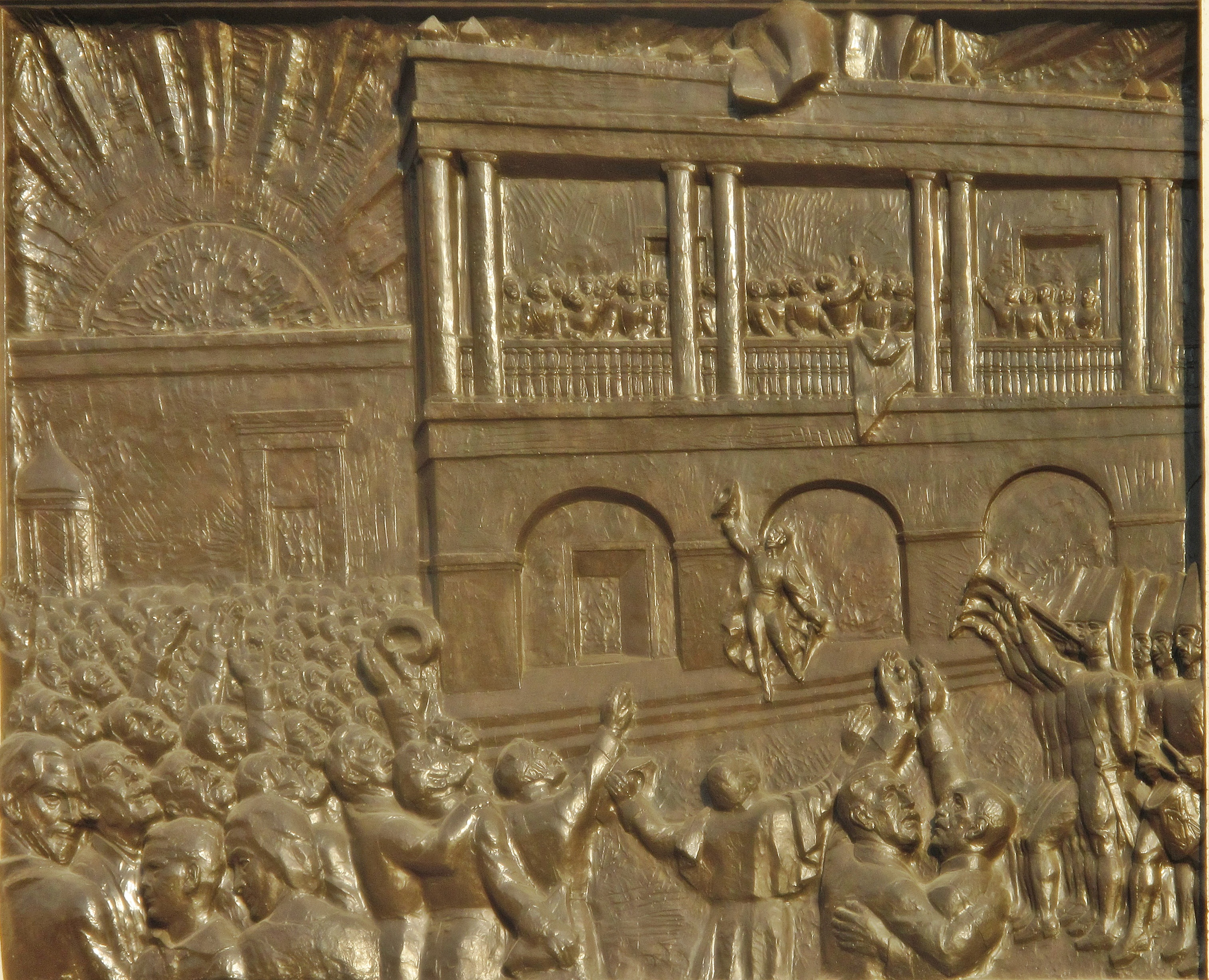
Plaque on the Freedom Monument in the Main Square of Trujillo city remembering the proclamation of the Independence of Trujillo by José Bernardo de Tagle y Portocarrero

After General Jose de San Martin landed at Paracas in September 1820, the intendant José Bernardo de Tagle y Portocarrero and the city mayor led an independence movement that culminated with the declaration of the independence of the Intendancy of Trujillo on 29 December 1820. On 12 February 1821 Jose de San Martin issued a Provisional Regulation, providing for the creation of the Department of Trujillo.

== See also ==
- Independence Day of Trujillo
- Independence of Trujillo
- La Libertad Region
