= Avenida España (Trujillo) =

España Avenue
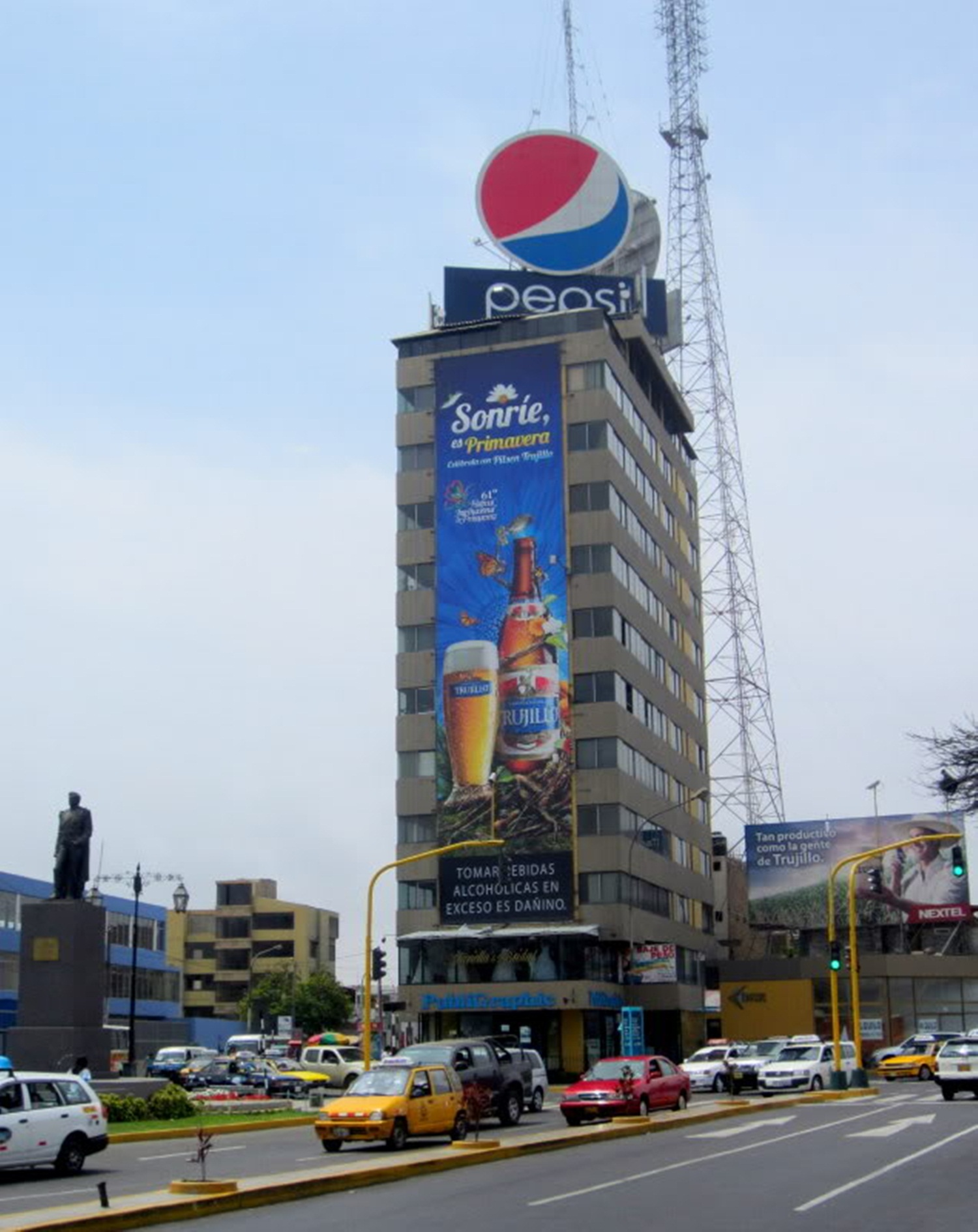
- España Avenue in Trujillo city
- Location: Trujillo
- From: Larco Avenue (West)
- To: Larco Avenue

España Avenue is one of the main vias in the Peruvian city of Trujillo located on the north coast of Peru. This avenue was built in an elliptical shape in the footsteps of the ancient wall of Trujillo and it surrounds the Historic Centre of Trujillo. This avenue hosts shopping centers and several companies. Having elliptical shape your journey begins and ends at the same point, if the tour starts in the west, on Larco Avenue, to scroll through any of the lanes of the avenue will end the tour at the same starting point.

== Route ==
The avenue is 27 blocks long. The first block of the avenue begins at the intersection with Larco Avenue up to Independence Street, in the historic center of Trujillo, all blocks of the avenue are cutting varied, there are schools, shopping centers, financial centers, services, etc.

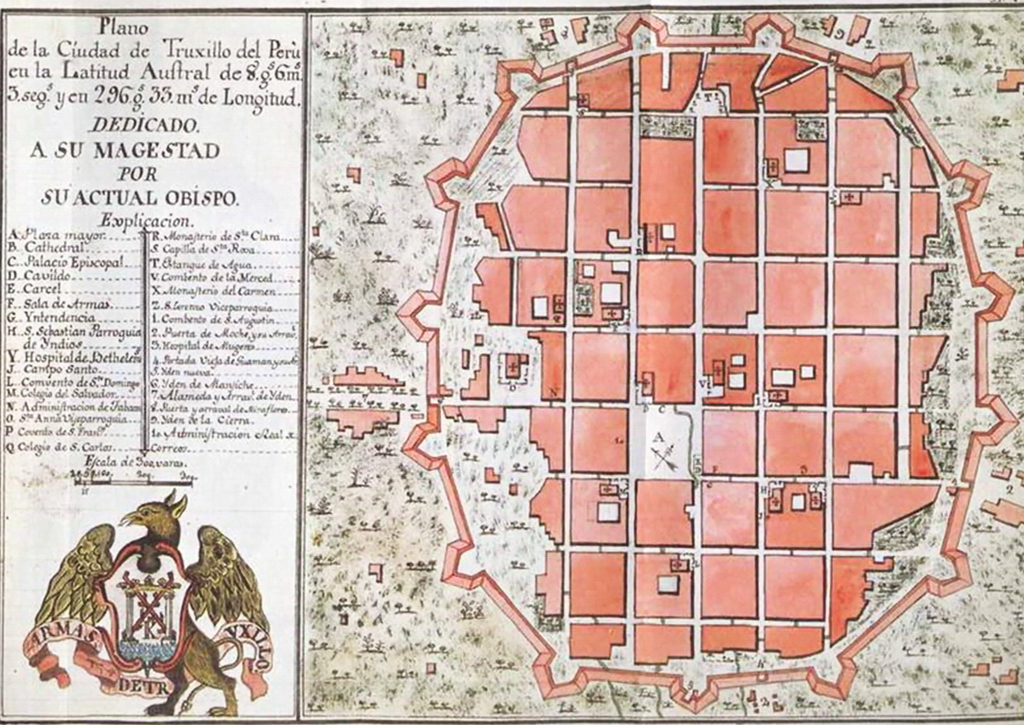
Map of Trujillo in 1786 made by Baltasar Jaime Martínez Compañón, It is shown the Wall of Trujillo

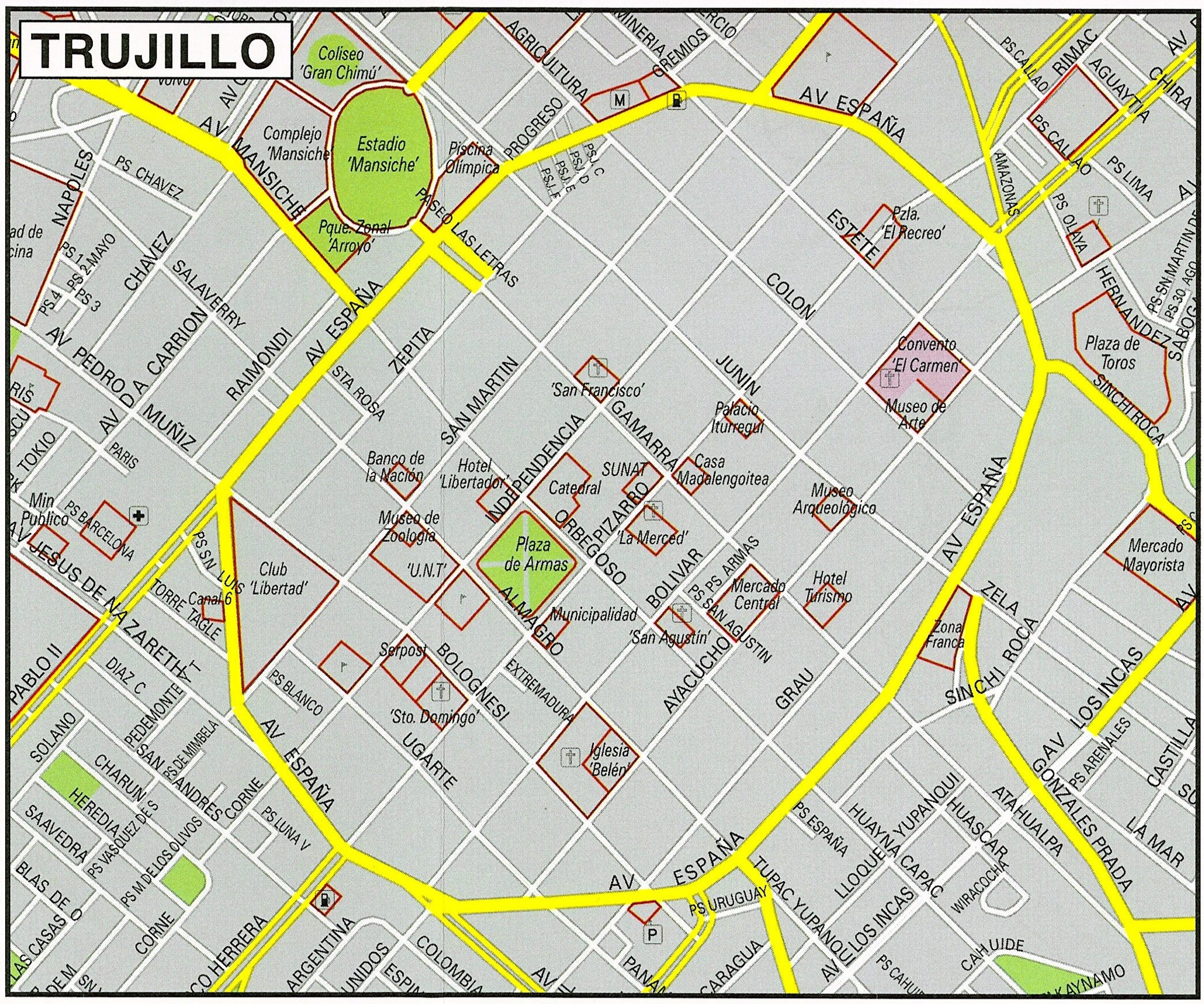
Map current historic center of Trujillo, still conserves the same structure of its foundation, It is seen the España avenue built over the trace of the old Wall of Trujillo

== Tourístic points ==
- Historic Centre of Trujillo
- Plazuela El Recreo
- Mansiche Boulevard
- Club Libertad de Trujillo

== See also ==
- Huanchaco
- Las Delicias beach
- Larco Avenue
- Santiago de Huamán
- Marinera Festival
- Trujillo
- Trujillo Spring Festival
- Victor Larco Herrera District
