= Trujillo Book Festival =

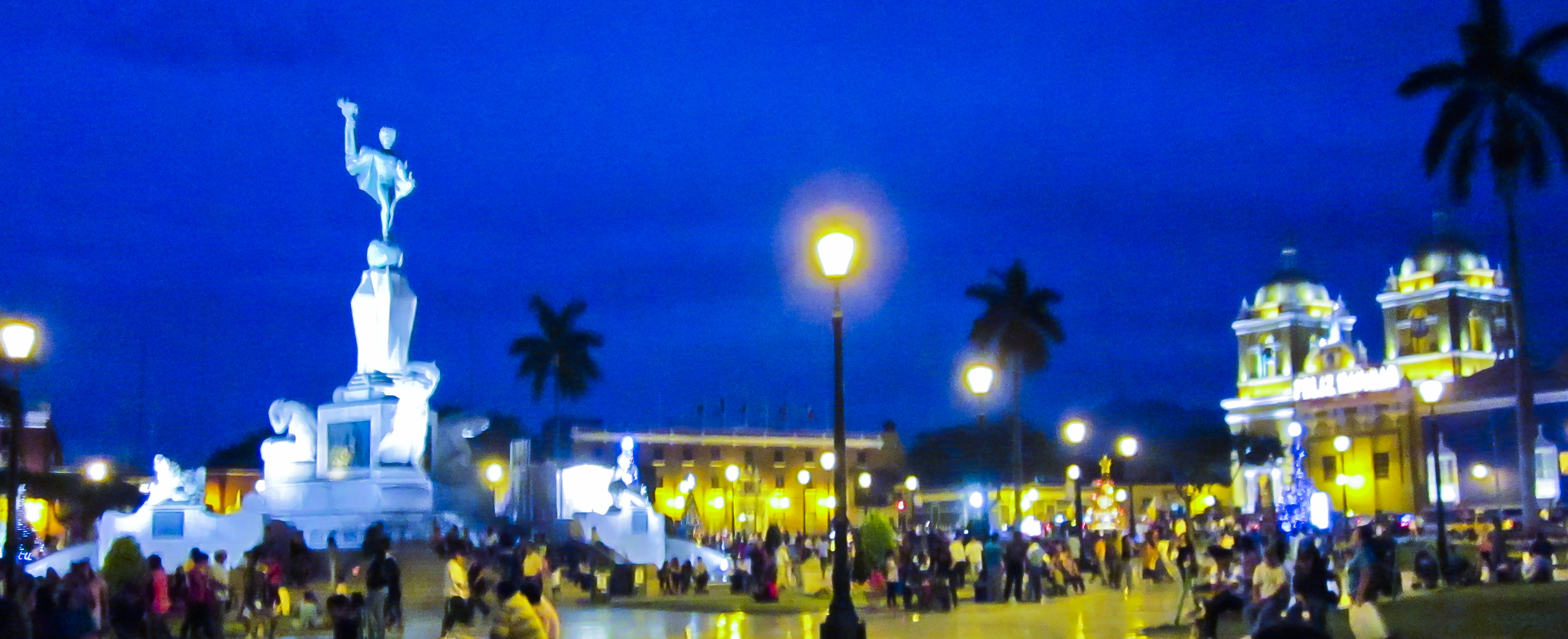
- Trujillo Main Square
- Genre: Printed Products
- Years active: 2003 - present
- Attendance: 100,000 (2012)

Trujillo Book Festival is an international literary festival held in Trujillo, a Peruvian city. The last edition in 2012 took place on March from days 1 to 12 in the Plazuela El Recreo an historical square of the city and had the participation of Peruvian writers as Arturo Corcuera and Jorge Diaz Herrera, writer honored, and also the young Colombian poet Lucia Estrada

== History ==
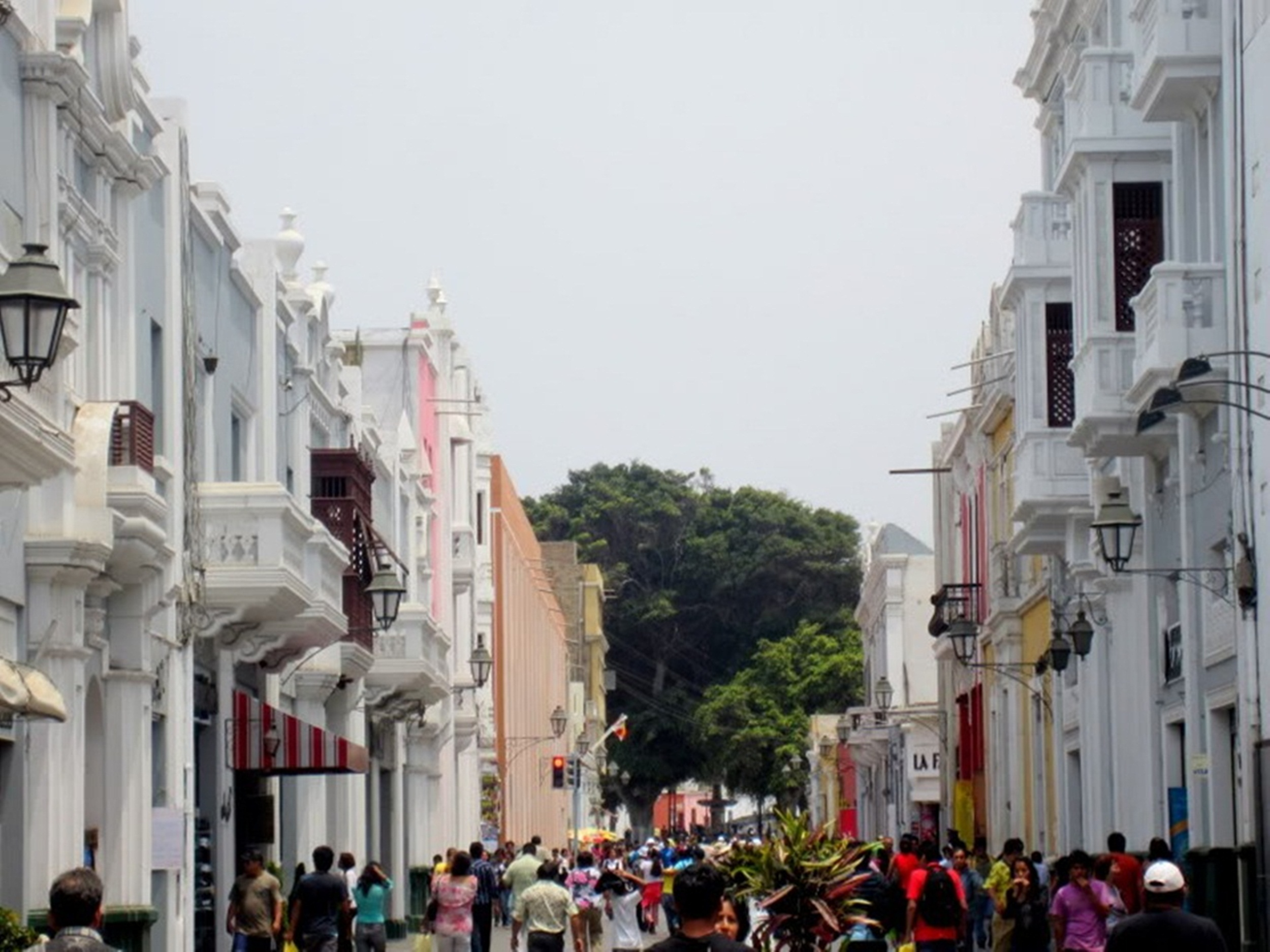
In the background it is seen the historical and traditional Plazuela El Recreo with its high trees; in 2012 it was the place of "Trujillo Book Festival" in the Historic Centre of Trujillo.

In the year 2009 took place the 4th edition of this festival, it was conducted at the Complejo Mansiche with the assistance of writers Laura Restrepo, Gonzalo Rojas and Alfredo Bryce Echenique, among others. It was initially organized by the "Association Trujillo Art and Literature".

=== 2012 ===
In the year 2012 it was organized by the Peruvian Chamber of Book by agreement with the Provincial Municipality of Trujillo, in the framework of the celebrations of 477 years of Spanish foundation of Trujillo. This time, it is estimated that more than 100,000 visitors attended to the "Plazuela El Recreo" to the 152 cultural and artistic activities, such as book presentations, poetry readings, tributes, lectures, shows and children's activities.

== See also ==
- Trujillo
- Marinera Festival
- Trujillo Spring Festival
- Las Delicias beach
- Huanchaco
- Santiago de Huamán
- Victor Larco Herrera District
