= Plazuela El Recreo =

Coordinates: 8.1072°S 79.0239°W

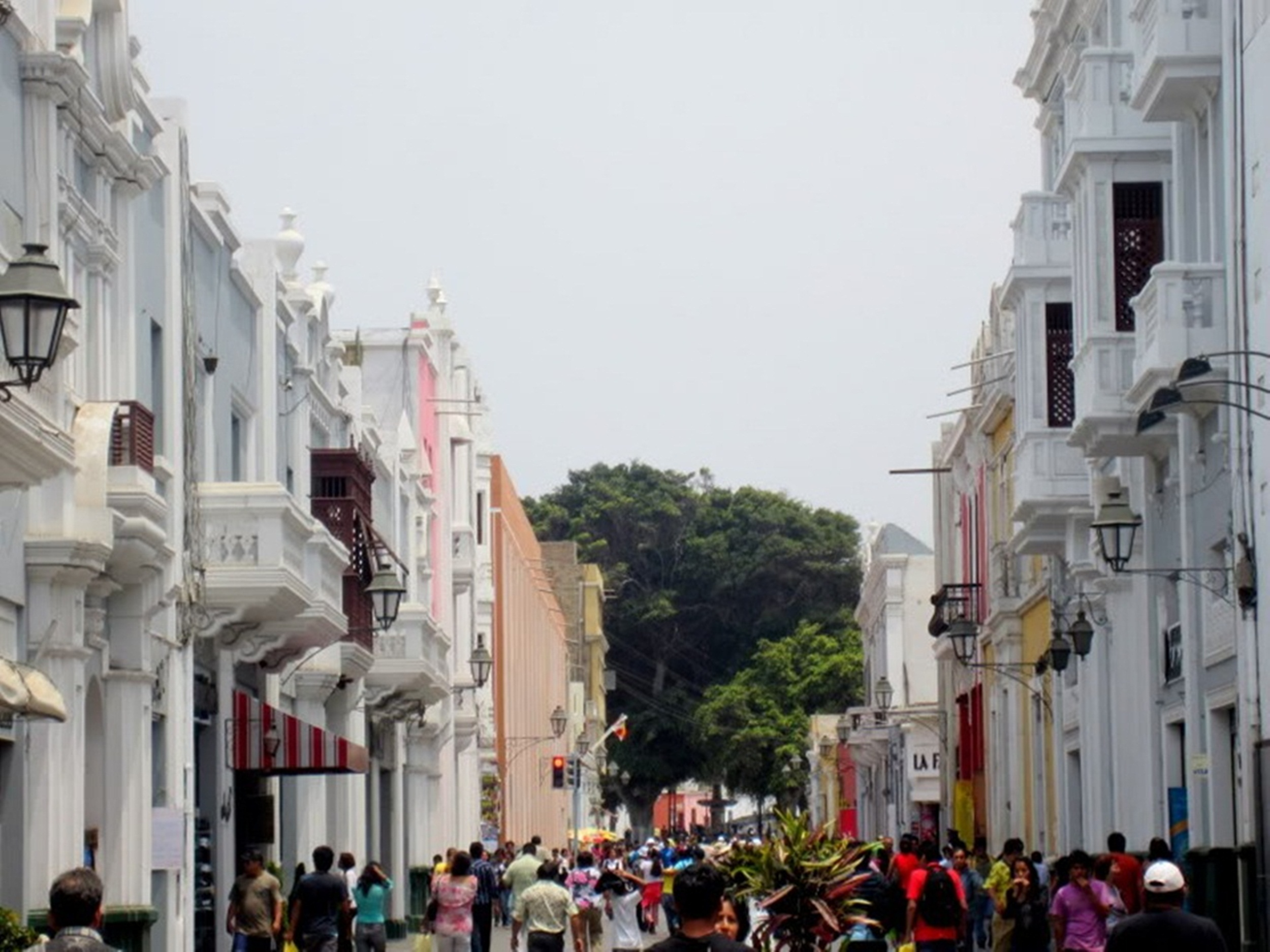
Colonial and republican architecture of the Paseo Pizarro one of the highest-traffic streets in the Historic Centre of Trujillo, at background is the historical and traditional Plazuela El Recreo and its tall trees.

The Plazuela El Recreo is a traditional square located in the Peruvian city of Trujillo in La Libertad Region in northern Peru. Situated at the 8th block of the Pizarro street in the Historic Centre of Trujillo in this square are held cultural shows and in March 2012 was the scenery of Trujillo Book Festival. The square has high ficus around. This square has been declared Monumental Heritage of the Nation by the National Institute of Culture of Peru.

== Description ==
In the center of the square is a marble fountain Italian Baroque style that was in the Plaza de Armas of Trujillo and was moved there in the 1930s, around the fountain there are 4 statues distributed in each frame corner fenced surrounding. There is also the old box that supplied drinking water to the city houses. Several elderly trees give shade to the plaza. In the Plazuela El Recreo are held events like concerts, book festivals, etc. It is visited by people who arrive to Trujillo city. In 2012 was born a project to rebuild the square.

== See also ==
- Historic Centre of Trujillo
- Chan Chan
- Huanchaco
- Puerto Chicama
- Chimu
- Pacasmayo beach
- Plaza de Armas of Trujillo
- Moche
- Víctor Larco Herrera District
- Vista Alegre
- Buenos Aires
- Las Delicias beach
- Independence of Trujillo
- Wall of Trujillo
- Santiago de Huamán
- Lake Conache
- Marinera Festival
- Trujillo Spring Festival
- Wetlands of Huanchaco
- Association of Breeders and Owners of Paso Horses in La Libertad
- Salaverry beach
- Puerto Morín
- Virú culture
- Marcahuamachuco
- Wiracochapampa
