= Wall of Trujillo =

17th century Peruvian fortification

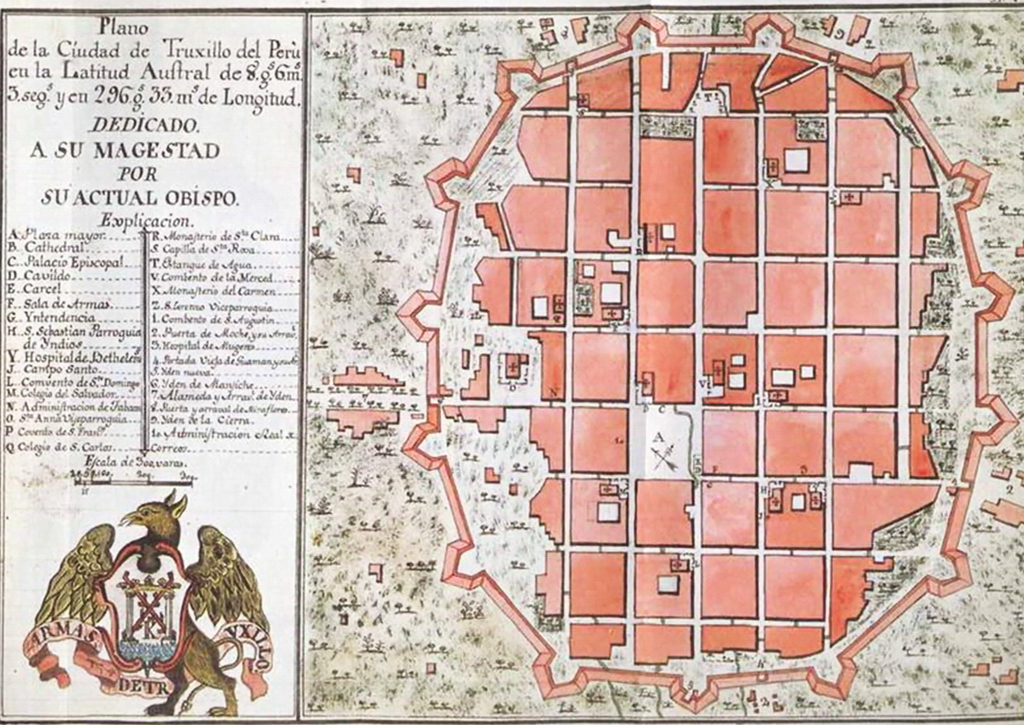
Map of Trujillo in 1786 made by Baltasar Jaime Martínez Compañón, shows The wall of Trujillo surrounding the Historic Centre of Trujillo; in the central zone currently it is located the Plaza de Armas of the city where on December 29 the Independence of Trujillo was proclaimed by Torre Tagle.

The Wall of Trujillo was a Peruvian defensive edification built in the 17th century to protect Trujillo city against attacks from pirates and privateers. Constructed by Viceroy Melchor de Navarra y Rocafull between 1687 and 1690, it surrounded the current historic centre of the city and included 15 bastions and five gates. It was torn down towards the end of 19th century to allow the construction of new neighborhoods as the city expanded.

Some sections of the wall can still be seen today, including parts that have been restored in El Recreo Square at the end of Pizarro Street in the historic center, which is now a public area. There are also still fragments of the wall conserved on España Avenue. Trujillo was one of three walled cities in the Americas during Spanish rule, the other two being Lima and Cartagena.

== History ==
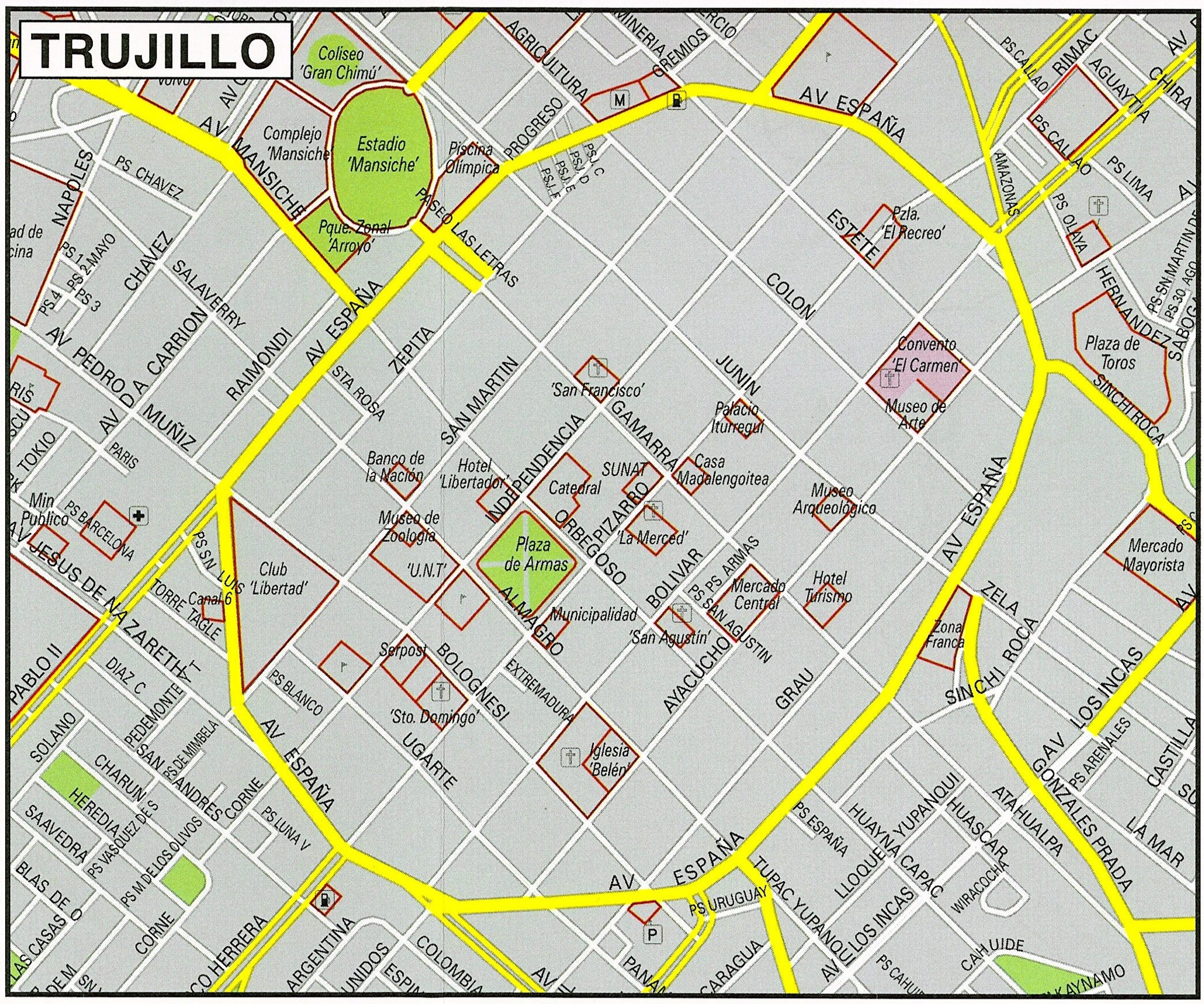
Map current Historic Centre of Trujillo, now España Avenue is over the place of the old wall of Trujillo

The wall was built during the Hispanic period to protect the city from pirate attacks, which were a common threat given Trujillo's proximity to the sea (roughly 5 km from the main plaza). Most colonial cities along the northern coast were subject to these attacks: Guayaquil was attacked in June 1624 by the Dutch army under the command of Jean Claude de Gubernat, who received the order from deputy Jaques L’Heremite Clerk. More than 20 houses were burned during the siege. The city also was maraudered by William Dampier in 1684, and by French pirates D’Hout, Picard and Groignet in 1687, who left the city half-destroyed. It was also bombarded by pirates from the Peruvian city of Saña. Given the looming threat of attack, the Wall of Trujillo was built in the 17th century during the reign of Viceroy Melchor de Navarra y Rocafull. It was constructed by the Italian Joseph Formento in 1687 under the leadership of mayors Bartolomé Martínez de Jarabeitia and Fernando Ramírez de Orellana. Formento based his design on a similar work done by Leonardo da Vinci for the Italian city of Florence.

== Architecture ==
It was designed in an elliptical shape and completed around the year 1690. The defensive structure was composed of 15 bastions, 15 curtain walls and 5 gates. The gate of Huamán was oriented towards the southwest and led to the village of the same name. The gate of Mansiche was in the north. The gate of Miraflores was to the northeast. The gate of la Sierra was towards the road leading to this region and finally the gate of Moche gave access to people from the south.

In 1942, on the space formerly occupied by the Wall of Trujillo, a street, España Avenue was built, the same as is currently around the area today officially called Historic Centre of Trujillo. The wall lacked moats and embankments.

== Current conservation ==
Some of the parts of the wall that are either still surviving or have been rebuilt/recreated are:

- Bastión Herrera located on the intersection of España Avenue with Miraflores Avenue. There also are located the area of the former Gate of Miraflores and the old part of the Graveyard of Miraflores (19th century) plus the streets adjacent to the bastion: Minería, Gremios and Comercio.
- Curtain of España Avenue: a restored curtain wall can be seen in block 18 of España Avenue, opposite the site of the former railway station of Trujillo.
- Bastión Bazán: remains of the former Baluarte de Bazán in block 26 of España Avenue, between Club Tell, 28 Julio Avenue and the local of the Municipal Box of Trujillo.
- Gate of la Sierra: a replica of the gate of the same name of the ancient wall that has been built in the Plazuela El Recreo near the end of Pizarro street, in the historic center of the city.

== See also ==
- Trujillo, Peru
- Historic Centre of Trujillo
- Defensive wall
