= Historic Centre of Trujillo =

Historic site in Trujillo, Peru

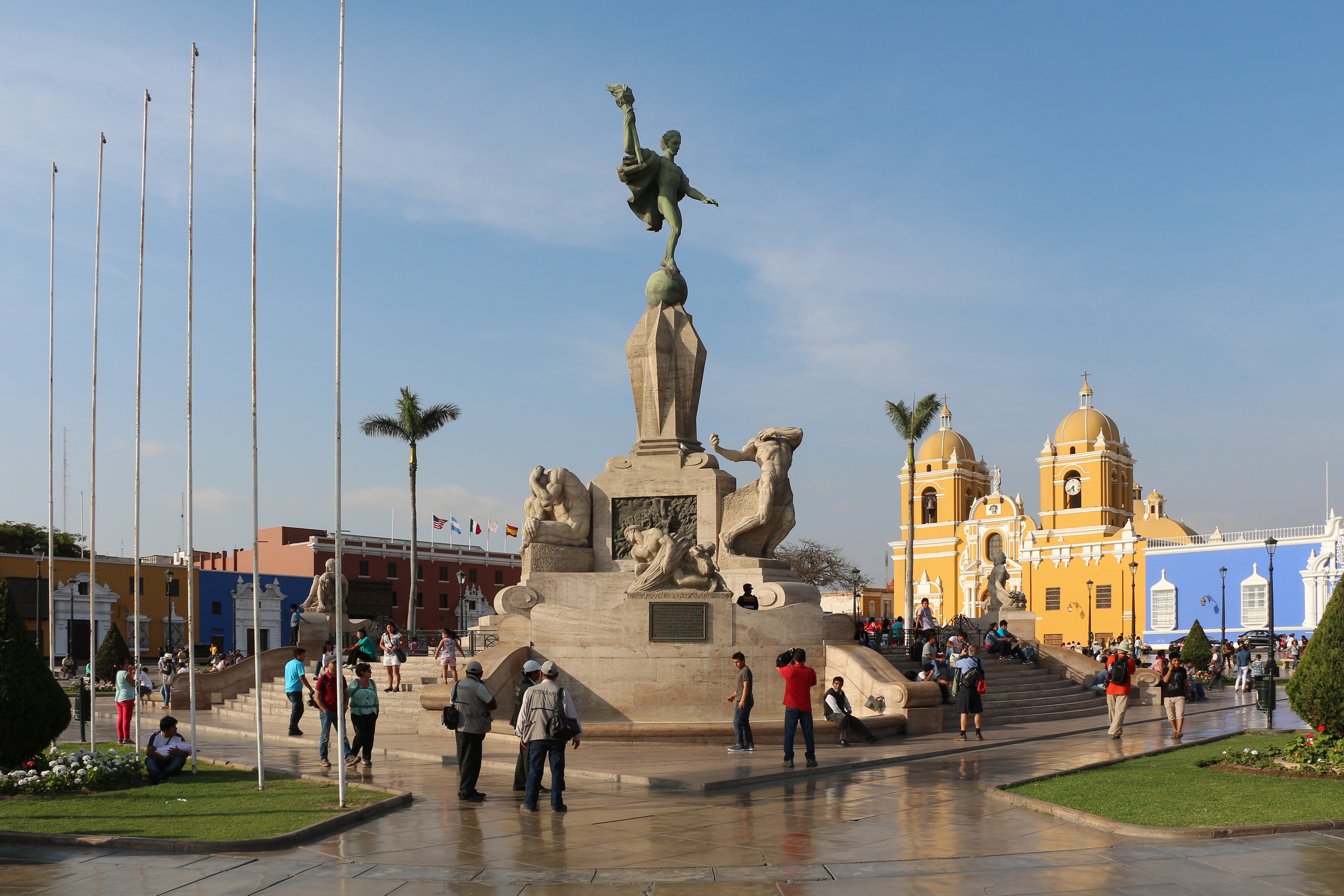

- Location within Peru
- Type: Historic city centre
- Location: Trujillo, Peru

History
- Declaration: Monumental City: April 23, 1971; Monumental Zone: December 28, 1972

Site notes
- Area: 133.5 ha (330 acres)

The Historic Centre of Trujillo is the historic city centre of the city of Trujillo, located in northern Peru. Located in the central part of the city, it is surrounded by Spain Avenue, which was paved over the former city walls that gave it the name of Cercado de Trujillo. It was declared a Monumental City through a Municipal Decree on April 23, 1971, later becoming a Monumental Zone through a Supreme Decree (2900-72-ED) on December 28, 1972.

Founded on December 6, 1534 by Diego de Almagro, it was the first city of the Viceroyalty of Peru to successfully declare independence from the Spanish Empire in late 1820. It currently maintains a dual status as both a historic centre and an active center of its metropolitan area. It consists of a total of 5,783 plots of land grouped in 72 blocks. According to 2005 census, it had a population of about 12,000 inhabitants.

== Overview ==
=== Urban fabric ===
Martín de Estete began the stroke of the city of Trujillo on behalf of Diego de Almagro in December 1534. The original urban fabric of the historic centre of Trujillo has an elliptical structure formed by the España Avenue, in this structure the streets are wide and straight, and are arranged in a checkerboard that part of the Plaza de Armas of the city. Besides the urban area surrounded by España Avenue is also part of the monumental area of the historic centre the area comprising the Mansiche sports complex, the former railway station of Trujillo as well as the area occupied by the bullring in the city and areas of the parts that still remain of the Old Wall of Trujillo.

=== Streets ===
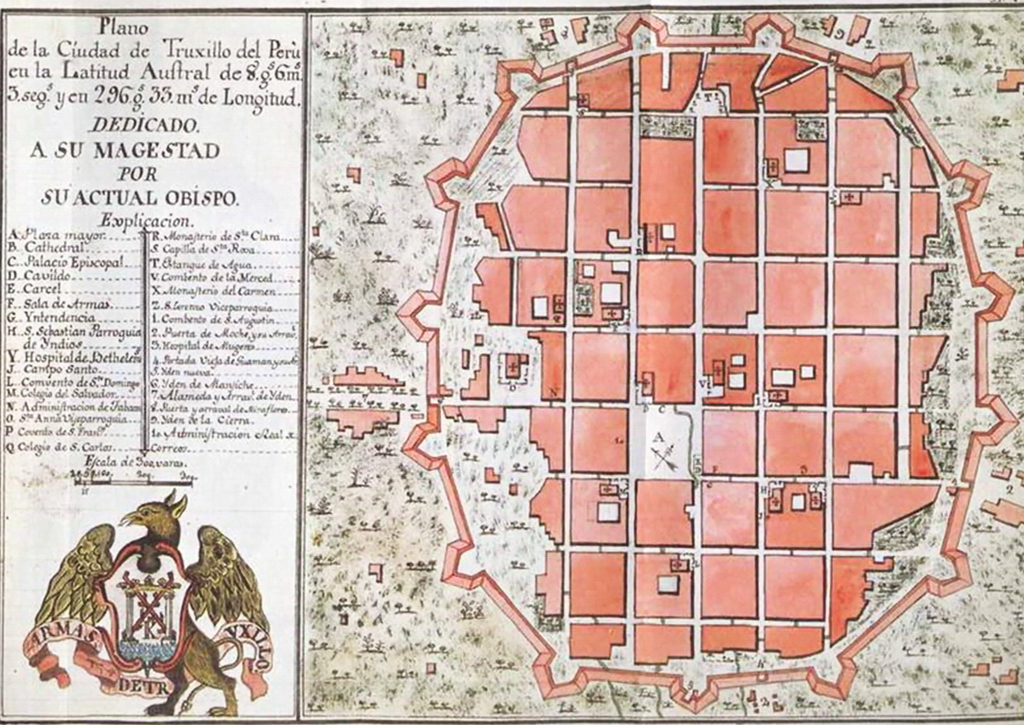
1786 map of Trujillo by Bishop Baltasar Jaime Martínez Compañón that shows the wall's 15 bastions, 15 curtains and 5 gates.

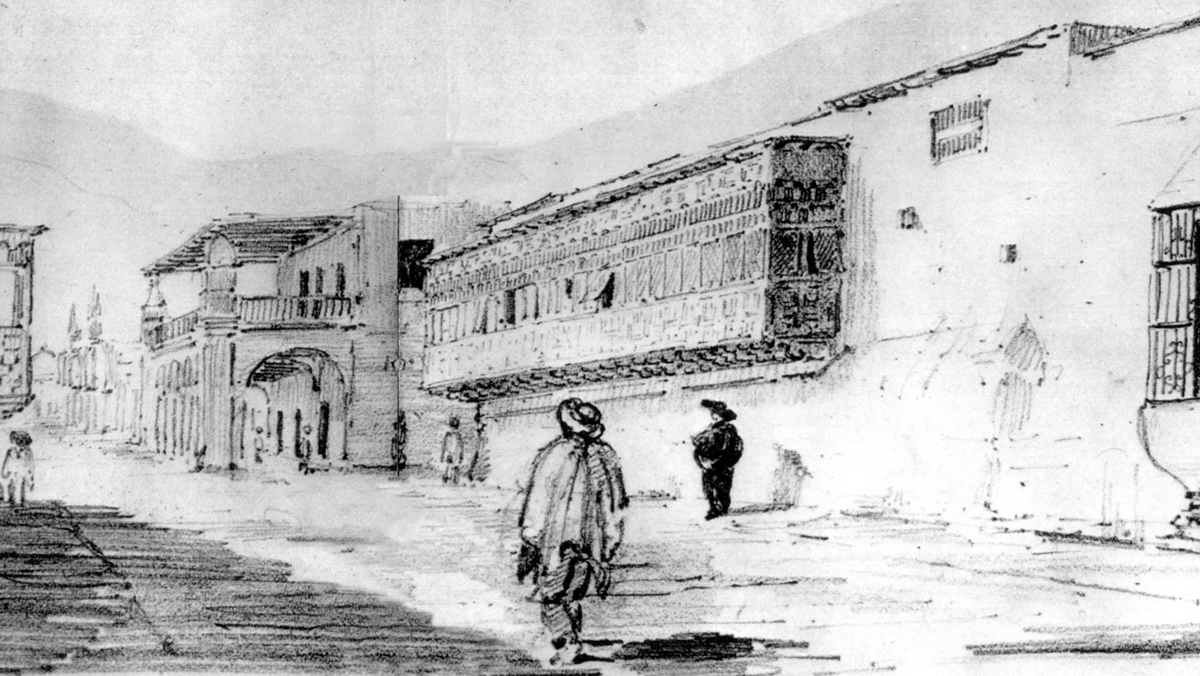
A view of the old jirón Pizarro

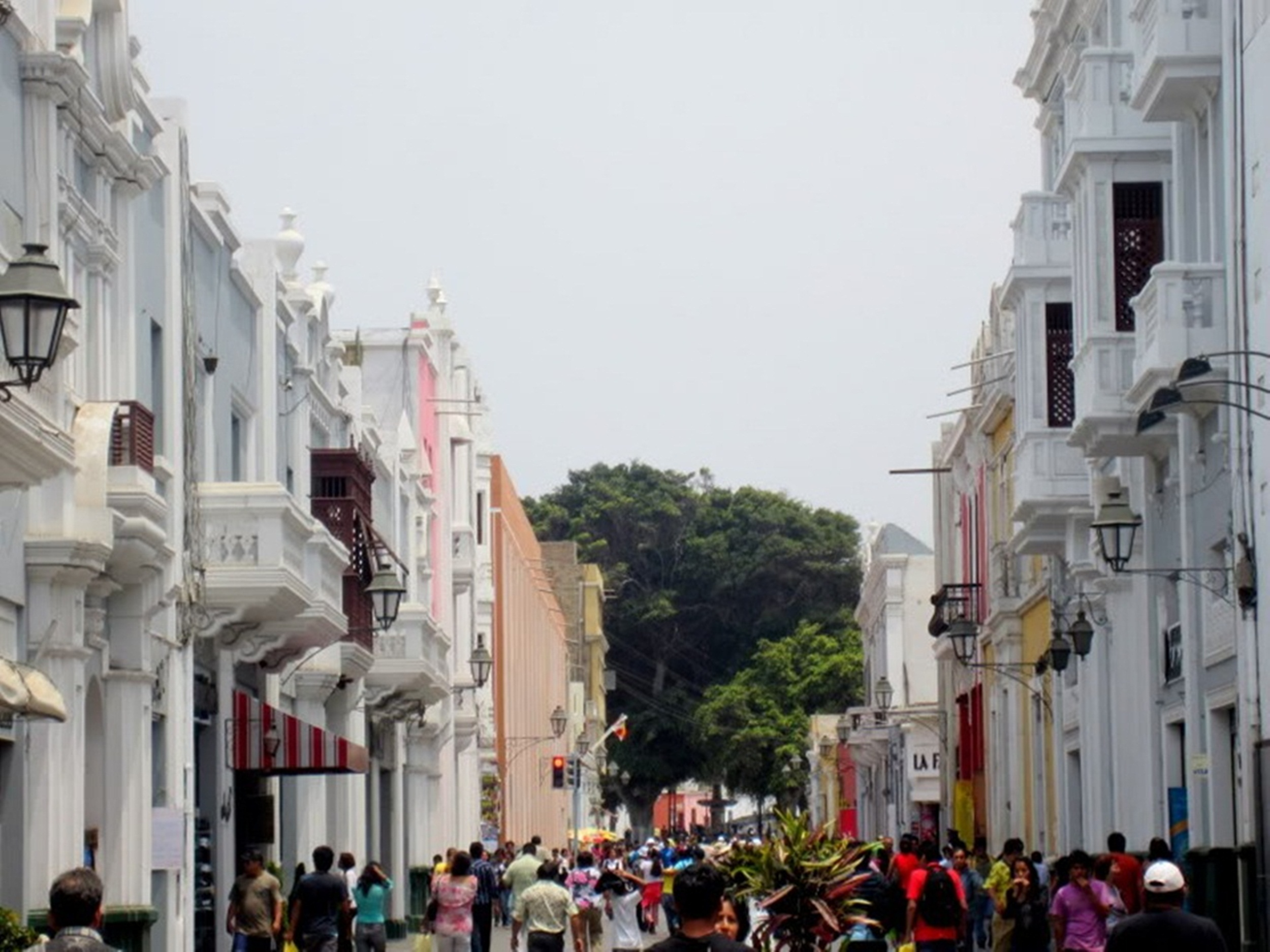
Colonial and republican architecture of the Paseo Pizarro one of the highest-traffic streets in the Historic Centre of Trujillo, at background is the historical and traditional Plazuela El Recreo and its tall trees.

- España avenue

It was built in the wake of the historic Wall of Trujillo that protected the city and it was built in the 17th century, still remain historically valuable parts of the architecture of this wall that was demolished to make way for the expansive growth of the city of Trujillo. The avenue España is a city ring road allowing the transit of large numbers of vehicles; this avenue is the main reference of the geographical boundary of much of the historic centre with the extended portion of the city.

- Avenue Mansiche, this road is an extension of the jirón Orbegoso from Avenue España along Mansiche sports complex and the alameda of the same name. Drive through some 12 km to the legendary resort of Huanchaco to the northwest of the city.
- Avenue Manuel Vera Enríquez, only belongs to the monumental area of the historic centre the section between Avenue España and Avenue Gerónimo de la Torre.
- Avenue Gerónimo de La Torre, is located between the avenues Mansiche and Manuel Vera Enríquez and defines one side of the Mansiche sports complex.
- Jirón Francisco Pizarro, is one of the highest traffic routes in the historic centre of Trujillo, to northeast continues Avenue España passing in the Rímac street then splicing with Avenue Santa; to southwest abuts directly with the Avenue Larco which extends to the Pacific Ocean in the Resort of Buenos Aires.
- Jirón Diego de Almagro, is one of four roads that form the Plaza de Armas of Trujillo in the corner of the intersection of this with the jirón Pizarro is the Palace of the City Government.
- Jirón Independencia
- Jirón Mariscal Orbegoso
- Jirón San Martín
- Jirón Zepita
- Jirón Simón Bolívar
- Jirón Miguel Grau
- Jirón Agustín Gamarra
- Jirón Alfonso Ugarte
- Jirón Francisco Bolognesi
- Jirón Colón
- Jirón Martín Estete
- Jirón Junín
- Pasaje Armas
- Pasaje San Agustín
- Pasaje Extremadura
- Pasaje Santa Rosa
- Pasaje Blanco
- Pasaje San Luis
- Pasaje C
- Pasaje D
- Pasaje E
- Pasaje F, the pasaje F, like pasajes C, D, E, is located in block 5 of the jirón Zepita.
- Paseo Pizarro

It is located on the main street of the historic centre of Trujillo, the Jirón Pizarro in blocks 5,6,7 and 8 becomes exclusively a pedestrian and joins the Plaza de Armas with the Plazuela El Recreo, along its four blocks are numerous landmarks like the Palace Iturregui, the Emancipation House, etc. and businesses such as supermarkets, souvenir shops, cafes and bars, etc. In this jirón of Trujillo's historic centre are also major banks and private and state institutions in the region as the office of the Ombudsman in block 3 and the Reserve Central Bank branch in block 4, among others.

== List of sites ==
The historic centre is the location of a number of important landmarks.

List of Landmarks
Name	Location	Notes	Photo
Balconies of Trujillo	Various	The local architecture typically features balconies and barred windows that are characteristic to the city.	
Casa Baanante	Jr. Ayacucho	Influenced by Islamic architecture, the house was built during the Republican era. The large hand carved wooden doors serve as entry into the first courtyard. Its second courtyard is larger and has fountains. It is owned by the Baanante family and used for social events.	
Casa Bracamonte (Lizarzaburu)	Jr. Independencia	Built in a neoclassical style, its first courtyard shows a flagstone floor and is surrounded by a raised gallery.	
Casa Calonge (Urquiaga)	Jr. Pizarro	Built in a neoclassical style, it once housed Simón Bolívar, whose desk remains, as well as gold ornaments of the Chimú culture and its period furnishings, all housed under the Museum of the Central Reserve Bank of Peru.	
Casa César Vallejo	Jr. Orbegoso & San Martín	It features a broad wooden balcony. It once housed poet César Vallejo, after whom it's named.	
Casa de la Emancipación	Jr. Gamarra & Pizarro	This building is the location from where the Intendant at the time, the Marquis of Torre Tagle, proclaimed the city's independence from Spain in 1820. It thus served as the headquarters of the first constituent congress, and as the home of President José de la Riva Agüero. The historical monument retains a series of 18th-century watercolours and serves as an active centre for cultural activities, such as art exhibitions, theatre performances, recitals and concerts. It is currently owned by the Banco Bilbao Vizcaya Argentaria, and houses a museum.	
Casa Ganoza Chopitea	Jr. Independencia	It is one of the most representative mansions of Trujillo, known by its baroque façade, crowned by a rococo pediment and two lions.	
Casa Orbegoso	Jr. Orbegoso	Constructed between the 18th and 19th centuries, it belonged to President Luis José de Orbegoso and currently retains many personal items of his, such as paintings, furniture, mirrors and silverware.	
Casa Risco	Jr. Ayacucho & Junín	It is named after the Risco family, who sold it to the Banco de la Vivienda, who restored it. It was transferred to the National University of Trujillo in 1995 to host the Museum of Archaeology, which shows the pre-Columbian development on the north coast for the past 12,000 years through seven rooms.	
Casa Tinoco	Jr. Pizarro (314) & Bolognesi	Also known as the Casa del Mayorazgo de Facalá, it was built in the 16th century by the owners of the first sugar company of Facalá. There, the first flag of independence was designed in 1820.	
Cathedral of Trujillo	Jr. Orbegoso, Plaza Mayor	Built between 1647 and 1666, its altars are in the Baroque and Rococo styles, while its paintings belong to the schools of Cuzco and Quito. It houses a museum, which features gold and silver viceregal-era works.	
Church of Belén	Jr. Almagro & Ayacucho	Built between 1710 and 1720, is home to a stone sculpture of the Holy Family. It used to be known as the Church of the Sacred Heart.	
Church and Monastery of El Carmen	Jr. Bolívar & Colón	Built in the 18th century, it hosts various altars, gold leaf-covered carvings, and a wooden pulpit, as well as about 150 paintings of the 17th and 18th centuries, some belonging to the Quito school. One painting is Otto van Veen's The Last Supper.	
Church of La Merced	Paseo Pizarro	Located next to the headquarters of the Superior Court of Justice of La Libertad, it dates back to the 17th century. Its façade, a mixture of architectural styles, is the work of the Portuguese architect Alonso de las Nieves. Inside, it features an organ in the rococo style.	
Church of San Agustín	Jr. Bolívar	Built in the 16th and 17th centuries with a baroque altar, it features murals depicting the apostles and a pulpit of carved and gilded wood that dates back to the Spanish era.	
Church of San Francisco	Jr. Independencia & Gamarra	Its main altar is adorned with colorful altarpieces and its pulpit dates back from the 17th century. The traditional and local San Juan National College, where poet César Vallejo once taught, is located within its premises.	
Church of San Lorenzo	Jr. Ayacucho & Colón	Built in the 18th century in the Churrigueresque style, it has a rococo altarpiece richly decorated with gold, with golden and broquelado techniques.	
Church of the Company of Jesus	Jr. Independencia & Almagro, Plaza Mayor	Built between 1632 and 1633, it was designed by the Jesuit Diego de la Puente.	
Church of Santa Ana	Jr. Orbegoso & Zepita	Contains Baroque paintings and sculptures, and its architecture has a resemblance to the churches of Mansiche and Huamán.	
Church and Monastery of Santa Clara	Jr. Independencia & Junín	The church exhibits exterior architecture of the early 19th century. Its interior houses three altarpieces and pulpits, as well as four polychrome reliefs that decorate the paintings and spandrels.	
Church of Santo Domingo	Jr. Pizarro & Bolognesi	Built between 1638 and 1642, it has an altarpiece of the Virgin of the Rosary at the main altar, and a crypt decorated with murals.	
Church of Santa Rosa	Jr. San Martín & Estete	The church was built between 1715 and 1717, and its inside walls are highly decorated with paintings.	
Itúrregui Palace	Paseo Pizarro	One of the most luxurious mansions in the historic centre, it is named after the count that built it. It is adorned in gold leaf details, mirrors and period furniture, and currently houses the Club Central de Trujillo.	
Municipal Theatre	Jr. Bolívar	Inaugurated in the late 19th century, it is one of the most important cultural venues of the city, with a capacity for more than 200 people. It is often the scene of numerous artistic performances as the National Festival of Ballet.	
Plaza Mayor		The main public square of the city, it is the location of its proclamation of independence and the site of a monument by Edmund Moeller. It is surrounded by Pizarro, Independencia, jirón Orbegoso and Almagro streets.	
Plazuela El Recreo	Paseo Pizarro	A popular spot among locals, it features a marble fountain that was moved from the main square in 1930.	

=== Other sites of interest ===
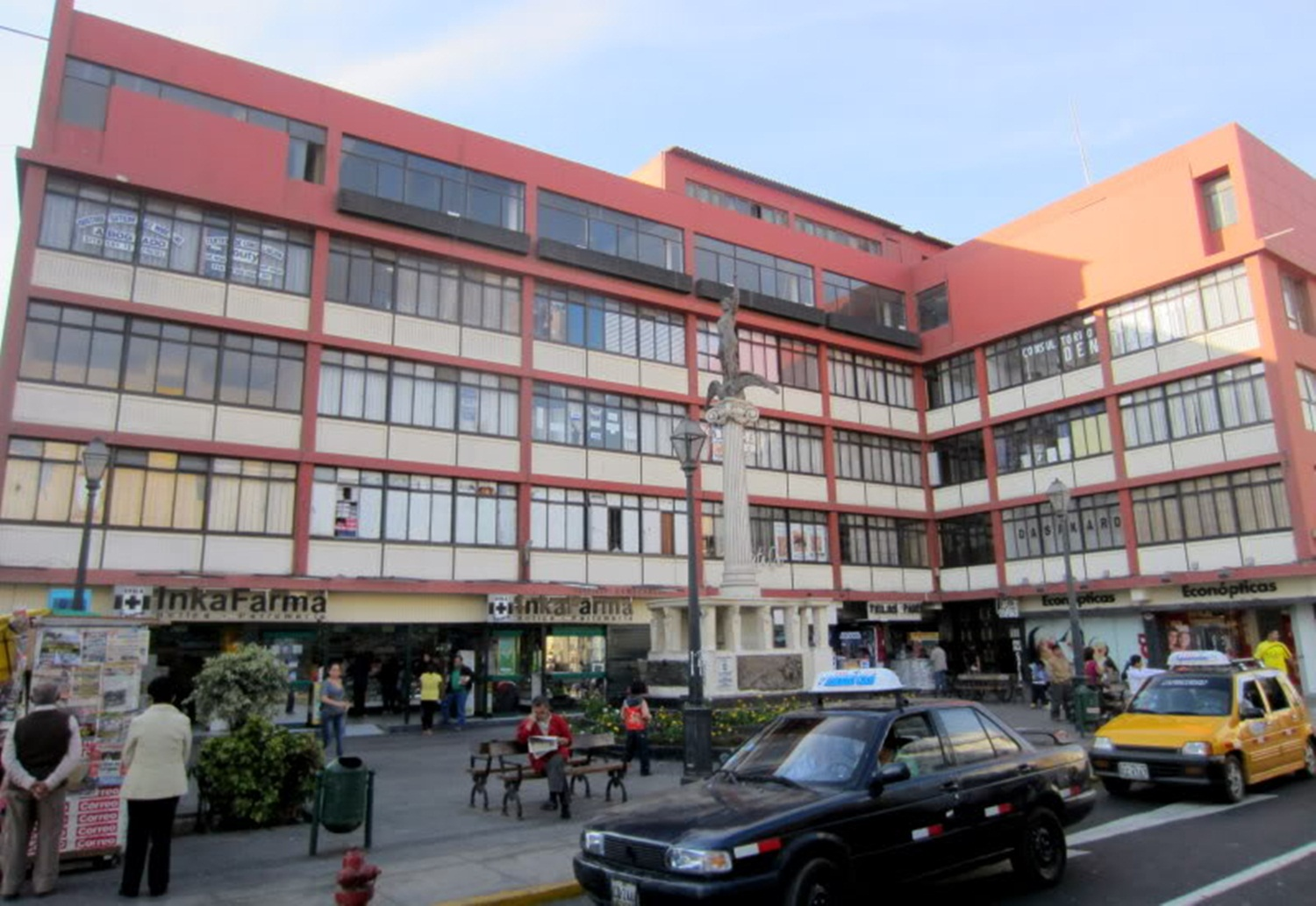
The traditional Plazuela Iquitos, in the corner of the intersection of streets Gamarra and Bolívar

- Plazuela El Recreo
- Municipal Theatre of Trujillo
- Plazuela Iquitos
- Plazuela San Agustín located in block 5 of the jirón Bolívar against the Church San Agustín.
- Plazuela Bolívar
- Plazuela La Merced, located next to the Church La Merced and the headquarters of the Superior Court of Justice of La Libertad in the Paseo Pizarro, usually stage performances.
- Paseo de las Letras
- Park of the Wall
- The Bastion Herrera and the Former Gate of Miraflores, parts of the old city wall, is the area of the former Bastion of Herrera, the Former Gate of Miraflores, the Jirón and Old Part (19th century) of the Miraflores cemetery. Also includes the adjoining streets to the Bastion (Minería, Gremios and Comercio).
- The City Hall
- Hospital Belén de Trujillo, founded on May 11, 1551, and is the second oldest hospital in the country. Initially had the name of Hospital Santiago, on land donated by Don Juan de Sandoval, husband of the lady Doña Florencia de Mora. Its main entrance is located in block 3 of the jirón Bolivar and occupies a space in the block composed of streets Bolívar, Bolognesi, Ayacucho and Almagro.
- La Alameda de Mansiche
- Toy Museum: Located a few blocks from the Plaza de Armas is with its coffee bar owned by the painter Gerardo Chávez, here it can find toys dating from the mid-20th century. It is located in the block of Jirón Independencia in one corner of the intersection with the Jirón Junín.
- Museum of the College of Architects of La Libertad: Another place that provide very culture is the College of Architects of La Libertad, located in the historic centre, the rooms of the seat of the school presented artwork by different authors, from time to time is changed the exposition with a new one.
- Museum of Zoology: Administered by the National University of Trujillo, the Museum of Zoology is one of the oldest in the city, it shows an interesting display of varied taxidermic fauna of the coast, highlands and jungle of Peru, each year the museum is one of the most visited in Trujillo, entrance fees vary for schools, universities and tourists. It is located in block 3 of the jirón San Martín.
- The Bullring of Trujillo

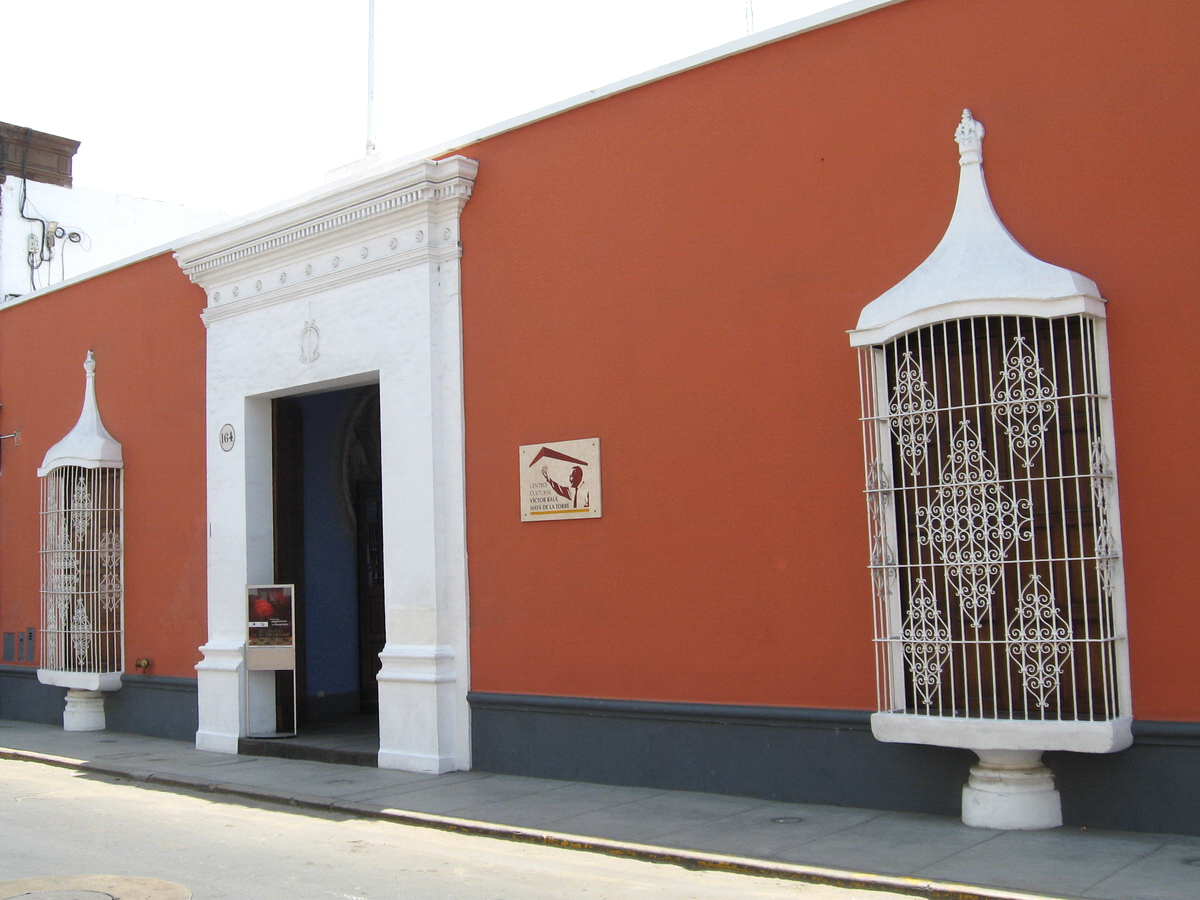
The Haya de la Torre Cultural centre.

- Víctor Raúl Haya de la Torre Cultural Centre: it opened on July 12, 2010, with five rooms devoted to political philosopher Víctor Raúl Haya de la Torre. In these first five rooms also reviews the cultural life of the city of Trujillo focusing on major figures of the "Grupo Norte" as were César Vallejo, Antenor Orrego, Ciro Alegría, Macedonio de la Torre, among others, and their heirs, the "Grupo Trilce", among them Julio Garrido Malaver, Eduardo González Viaña and Cristóbal Campana, who was at the time in charge of the executive unit No 11 responsible for the upkeep of the citadel of Chan Chan.
- Former railroad station
- Former Gate de la Sierra, part of the old city wall, comprising the blocks 1st. and 2nd. of Jirón Unión from Avenue España; corresponds to the first expansion of the walled city. This area retains some buildings of monumental value.
- Theatre San Juan, located in block 6 of street Independencia, is the scene of many artistic representations.
- Coliseum Inca, located in the intersection of Independencia and Estete streets.
- Casino Excálibur, in block 6 of Paseo Pizarro.
- El Estribo, touristic peña located in the 8th block of Jirón San Martín.
- Karaoke and casino Solid Gold in block 5 of the jirón Orbegoso.
- Casino Moulin Rouge, located in block 5 of the jirón Orbegoso.
- Casino Royal in the Plaza de Armas of the city.
- Mansiche Sports Complex
- Galleries and malls:
  - Real Plaza
  - El Mercado Central
  - El Virrey
  - Centro Comercial Primavera
  - El Palacio de Hierro

== See also ==
- Trujillo
- Plaza de Armas of Trujillo
- Freedom Monument
- Independence of Trujillo
- Moche
- Huanchaco
- Las Delicias beach
