= Edmund Moeller (sculptor) =

German sculptor

- Born: 8 August 1885; Neustadt, Bavaria
- Died: 19 January 1958 (aged 72); Dresden, Saxony, East Germany
- Occupation: Sculptor

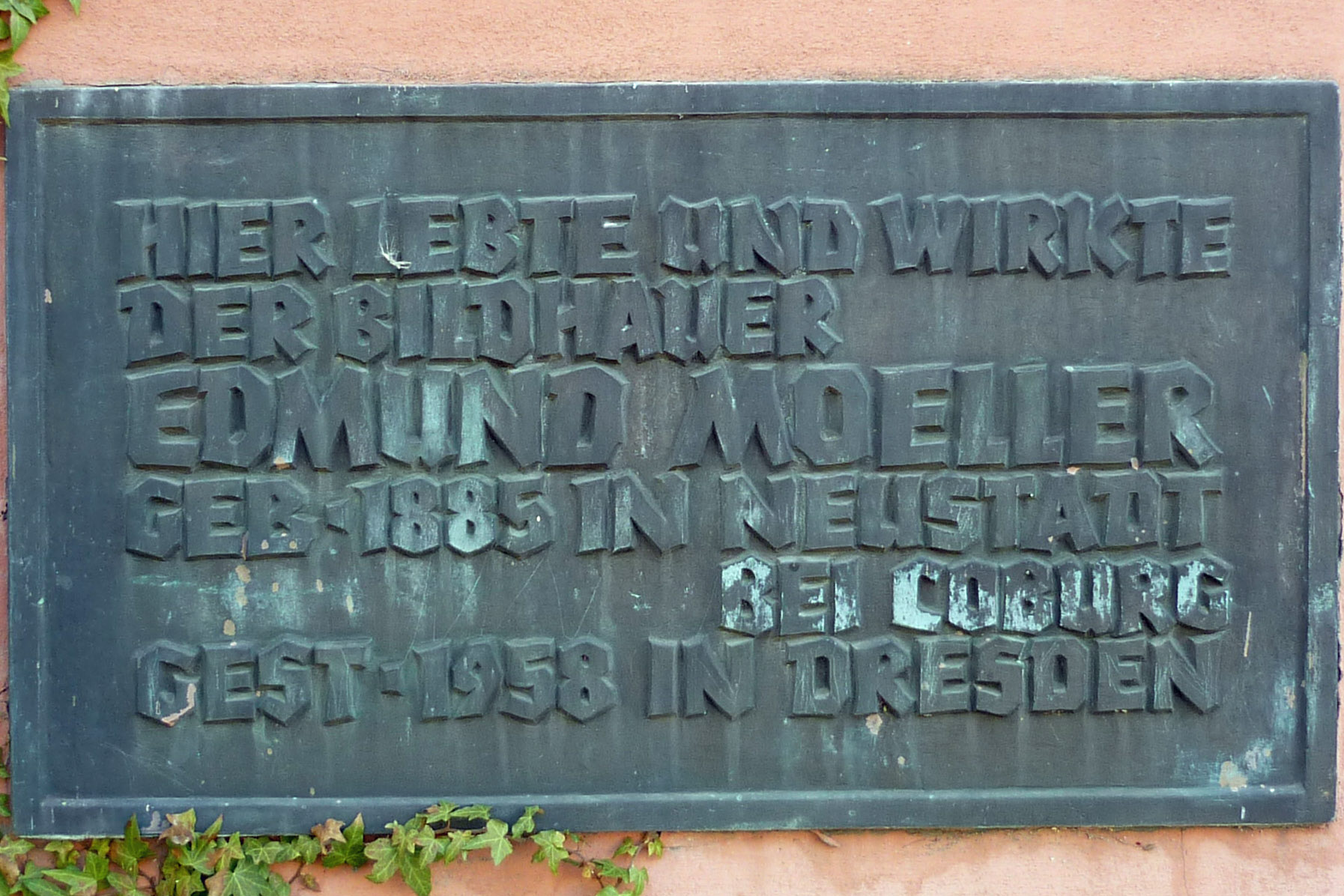
Memorial plate at Moeller’s former house in Dresden-Mockritz.

Edmund Moeller was an early twentieth century German sculptor. He was born on 8 August 1885 in Neustadt, Bavaria and died on 19 January 1958 in Dresden, Saxony. He studied in Dresden and Düsseldorf.

== Life and career ==
Moeller was born in Neustadt in the district of Coburg, a city of the Free State of Bavaria. He studied in Dresden and Düsseldorf and also in Italy. On 22 March 1907, Prince Johann Georg of Coburg, representing the academic council of Dresden, awarded Moeller the top prize of 200,000 marks, to help pursue his studies in Italy. For his work in the Freedom Monument in the city of Trujillo, the Peruvian government awarded Moeller the highest award of the state: The Sun of Peru medal, as well as the title of professor. Moeller died in Dresden in 1958.

== Work ==
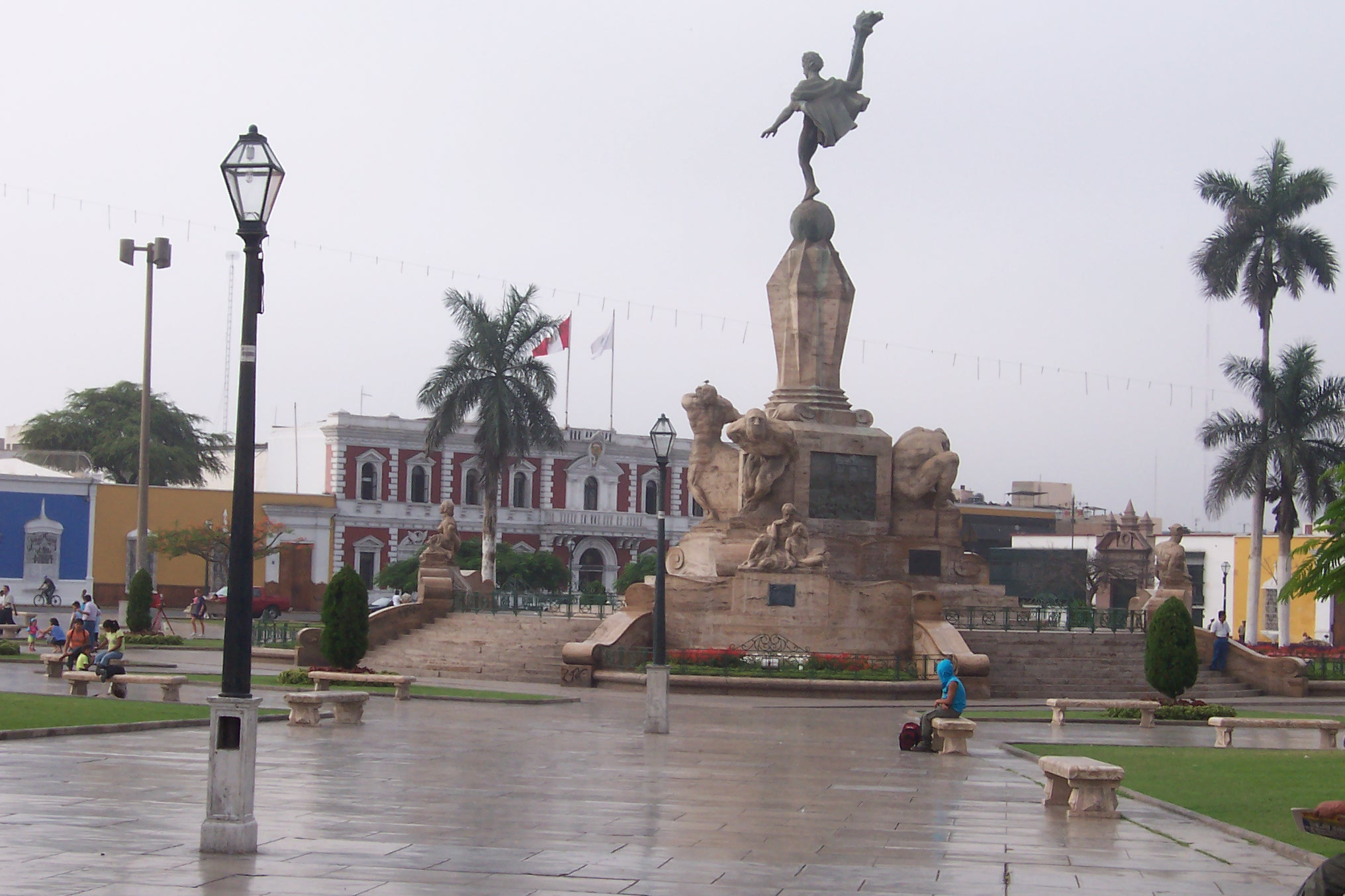
Freedom Monument, in Trujillo, Peru, Moeller's most famous work.

One of his best known works of sculpture is the Freedom Monument which opened in 1927 in the city of Trujillo, Peru. It was created to celebrate and memorialize the independence of Trujillo from Spain. This sculpture is located in the Plaza de Armas of Trujillo. Edmund Moeller won the international competition held by the Municipality of Trujillo for the construction of the sculpture. The artist worked on the sculpture for four years, one month and 25 days. The Freedom Monument remains permanently installed in its original location.

Another sculpture, The Ball Young, earned Moeller the Prix de Rome, The sculpture was presented to the artist at an art exhibition in Berlin in 1914. The Lamentation marble statue was acquired the following year by the state of Saxony for the Museum of Leipzig. In 1917, the Albertinum in Dresden purchased Moeller's bust of Max Liebermann and the Prussian Ministry of the group worship acquired Samson and the Lion, for the German Evangelical Church in Rome.
