= Plaza de Armas of Trujillo (Peru) =

Square in Trujillo, Peru

Coordinates: 8.1118°S 79.0286°W

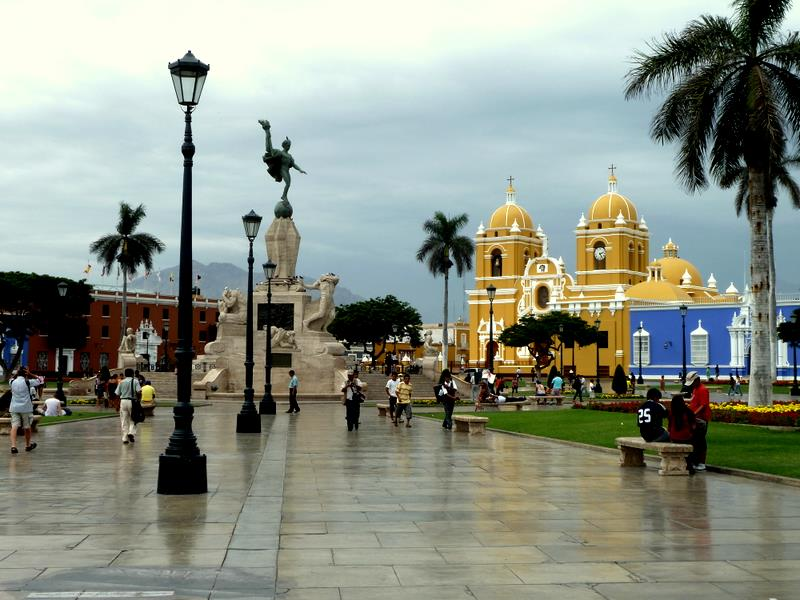
Plaza de armas of Trujillo

Plaza de Armas of Trujillo is the main square where the Spanish foundation of Trujillo was made, in northern Peru. It has been the principal locus of history in this city in the republic era. It is located in the central zone of the Historic Centre of Trujillo. In the streets that form this main square are located the buildings of Municipality Palace, the Cathedral, among others. The Plaza de Armas of Trujillo is formed by the Pizarro, Independencia, Orbegoso and Almagro streets. In this square, the proclamation of the independence of Trujillo took place.

== History ==
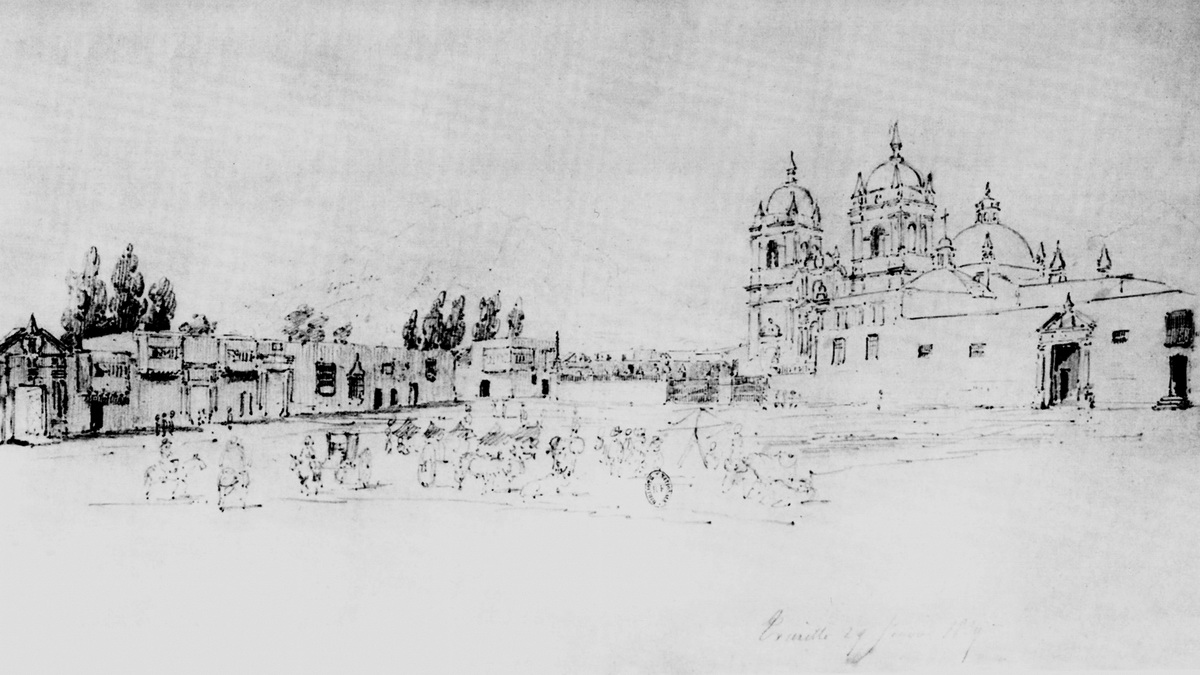
Plaza de armas of Trujillo in 1839, by "Léonce Angrand"

Martin de Estete began the design of the streets of Trujillo by order of Diego de Almagro in the end of the year of 1534, so he designed the structure and dimensions of the Plaza de Armas. In 1841, Pedro de Mandalengoitia Sanz de Zarate donated to the square a fountain made of white stone that was built on his farm and mill in Santa Cruz de Carabamba. On December 29, 1820, the Plaza de Armas was the scene of the proclamation of Independence of Trujillo by the Marquis of Torre Tagle. In this square are located the cathedral of the city and mansions dating back to the Hispanic and republican periods. On July 4, 1929, in the middle of this square, the Freedom Monument was opened, which represents the country's independence process and according to "commentators it represents the most precious of human beings, the love of freedom, the memory and recognition of the distinguished men who gave us independence". The statue was a work in Germany, the materials used are marble and copper, the sculptor was Edmund Moeller and it was armed by Henry Albrecht.

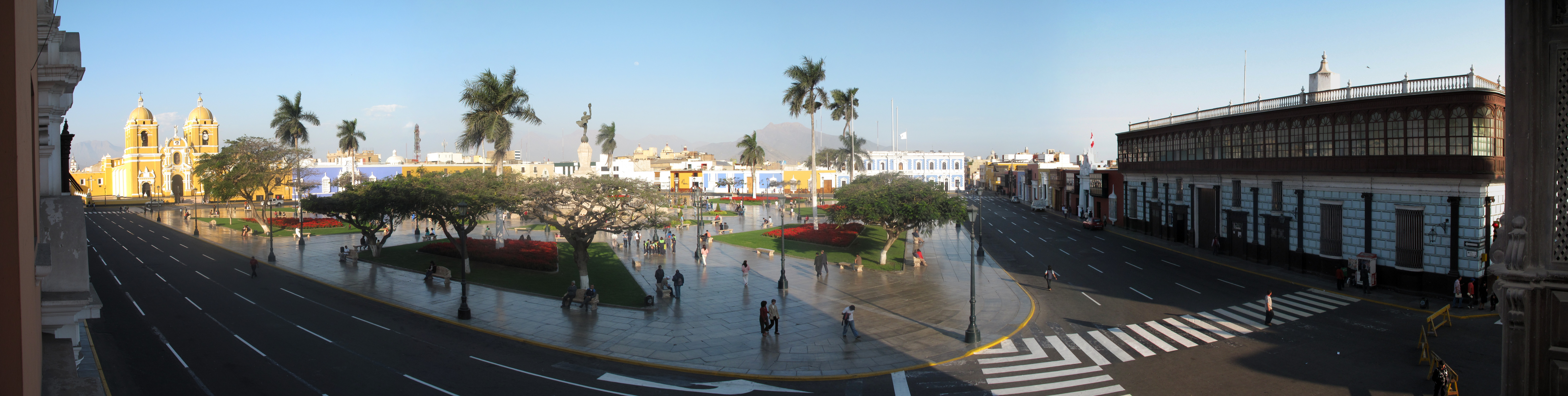
View of Plaza de Armas of Trujillo

== Freedom Monument ==
The Freedom Monument, located in the center of the Plaza de Armas in Trujillo, Peru, is the work of sculptor Edmund Moeller. It consists of three sections: the first is on a circular platform with pedestals, resting on a granite base, and supporting sculptures representing the art, science, trade and health. The second section consists of three statues: a bent man, symbolizing oppression or slavery; a person with arms reaching backwards, symbolizing the struggle for freedom; and a man with arms raised and hands making fists, symbolizing liberation. The section contains three plaques. The first recalls the proclamation of the independence of Trujillo by José Bernardo de Torre Tagle, on December 29, 1820. The second plaque commemorates the Battle of Junín, and the third plaque commemorates the Battle of Ayacucho.

An effort to commemorate independence was launched, with support from regional deputy Enrique Marquina. A committee including the prefect, the rector of the Universidad Nacional de Trujillo, President of the Superior Court of Justice of La Libertad, and the mayor of Trujillo was established to manage the creation of the Freedom Monument. In 1921, they began a call for national and foreign artists to submit their designs. The jury, chaired by the Prefect Derteano Molina, received 104 designs, mostly from Europe.

German artist Edmund Moeller was hired and the jury awarded the sculptor the prize of 1000 pounds. The agreement with Moeller to cover the cost of the project was 250 thousand Soles de Oro. The sculpture was built in Germany and inaugurated on July 4, 1929, with Augusto B. Leguía and his daughter Carmen Rosa Leguia Swayne in attendance.

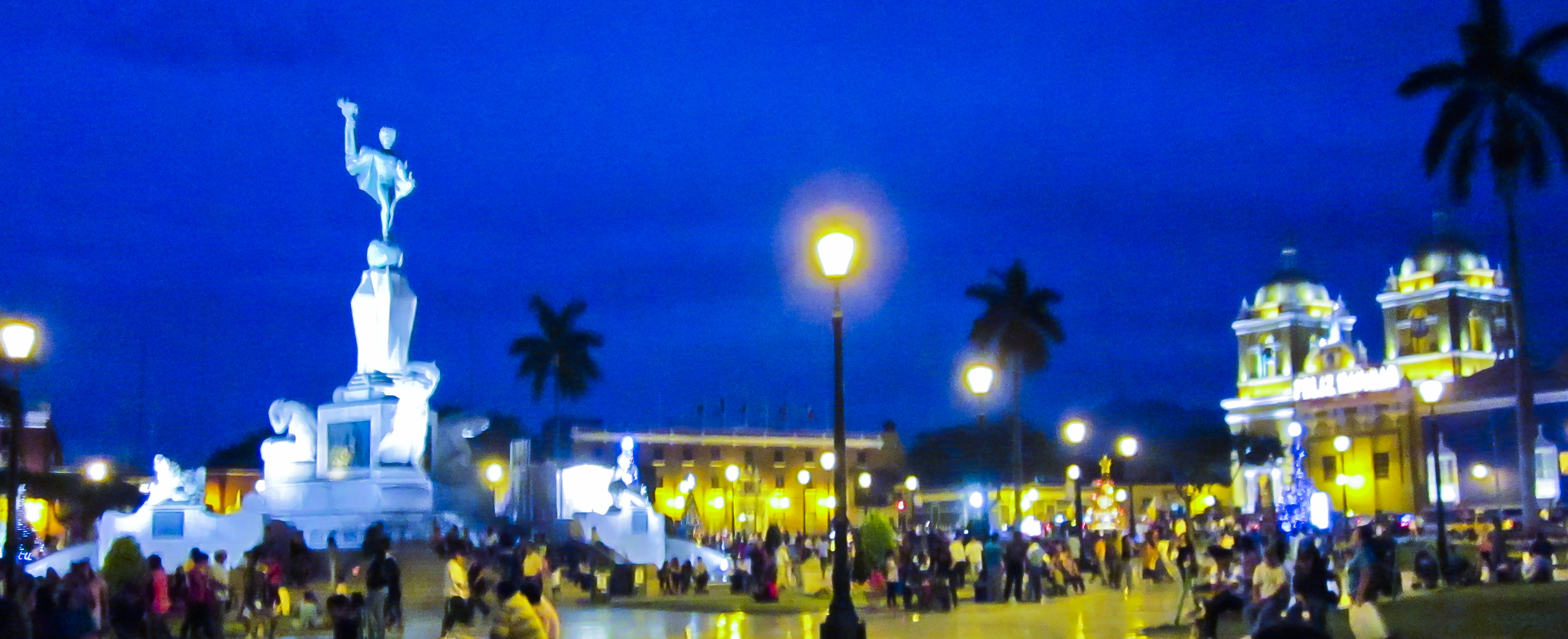
In the Main Square of Trujillo of the Historic Centre of Trujillo on December 29, 1820 the independence of Trujillo was proclaimed by the Marquis of Torre Tagle, in honor to the city the Freedom Monument by sculptor Edmund Moeller

=== Buildings ===
Location of some buildings
North side
North east side		North east side
Libertador Hotel	Archdiocese of Trujillo	Archdiocese of Trujillo
Independencia street.	Freedom Monument Plaza de Armas of Trujillo	Trujillo Cathedral
"Muñoz y Cañete", house it belonged to Francisco Pizarro.	Freedom Monument Plaza de Armas of Trujillo	Trujillo Cathedral
Buildings in Almagro street.	Francisco Pizarro street	Buildings in the southern part.
South side

== Streets ==
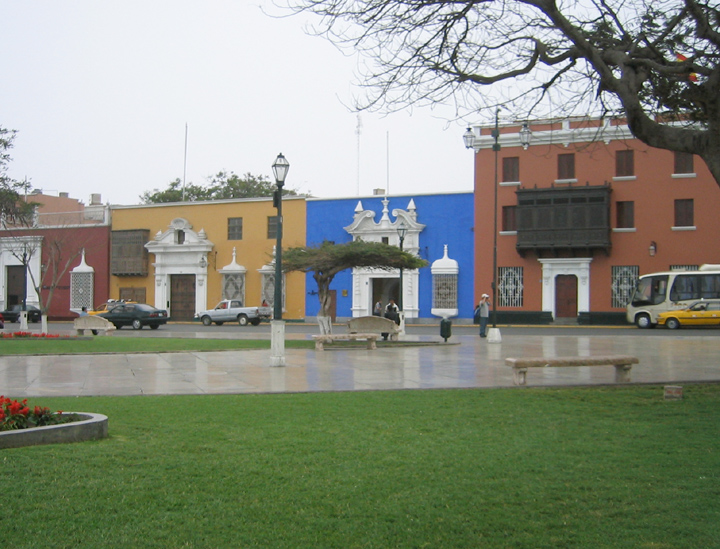
Independencia street

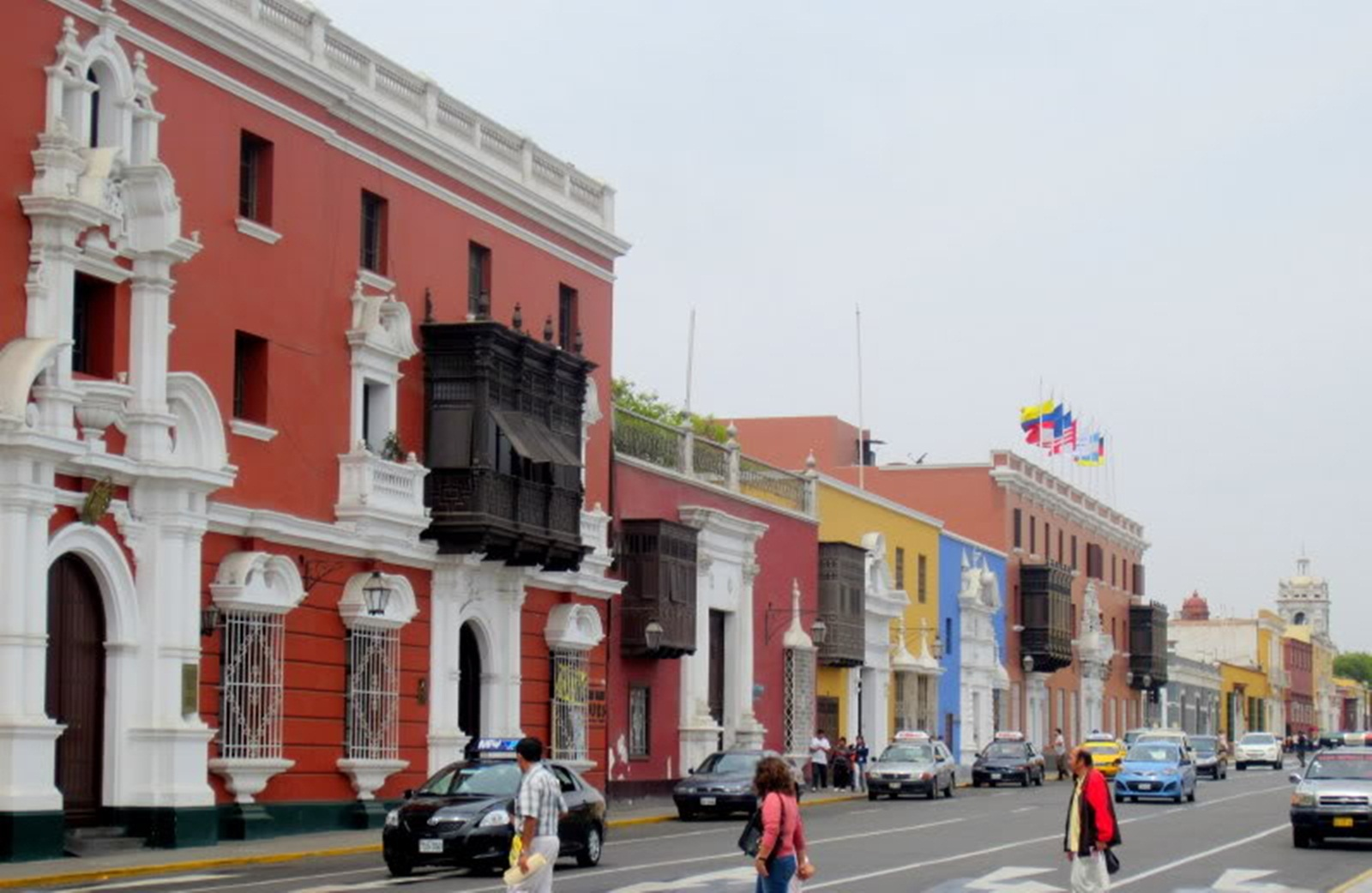
Buildings in Independencia street

- Francisco Pizarro
- Diego de Almagro
- Independencia
- Mariscal Orbegoso

== Celebrations and festivals ==
In the Plaza de Armas of Trujillo are realized important celebrations y ceremonies such as Corpus Christi in June, parade for Trujillo Marinera Festival in January, independence day of Trujillo on December 29 of every year, etc.

== See also ==
- Trujillo
- Historic Centre of Trujillo
- Independence of Trujillo
- La Libertad Region
