= Moche =

Moche can refer to:

== Culture ==
- Moche culture

== Geography ==
- Moche, Trujillo, a city in Peru
- The Countryside of Moche
- The Moche River
- The Valley of Moche
- Moche District, one of 11 districts of Trujillo Province

== Food ==
- Moche (food), also spelled mochi or muchi, a Filipino rice cake derived from Chinese-Filipino buchi (jian dui)

== Telecommunications ==
- Moche (Portuguese mobile), is a mobile operator of the MEO brand.

== See also ==
- Mocha
