= Moche Route =

Archaeological site in Peru

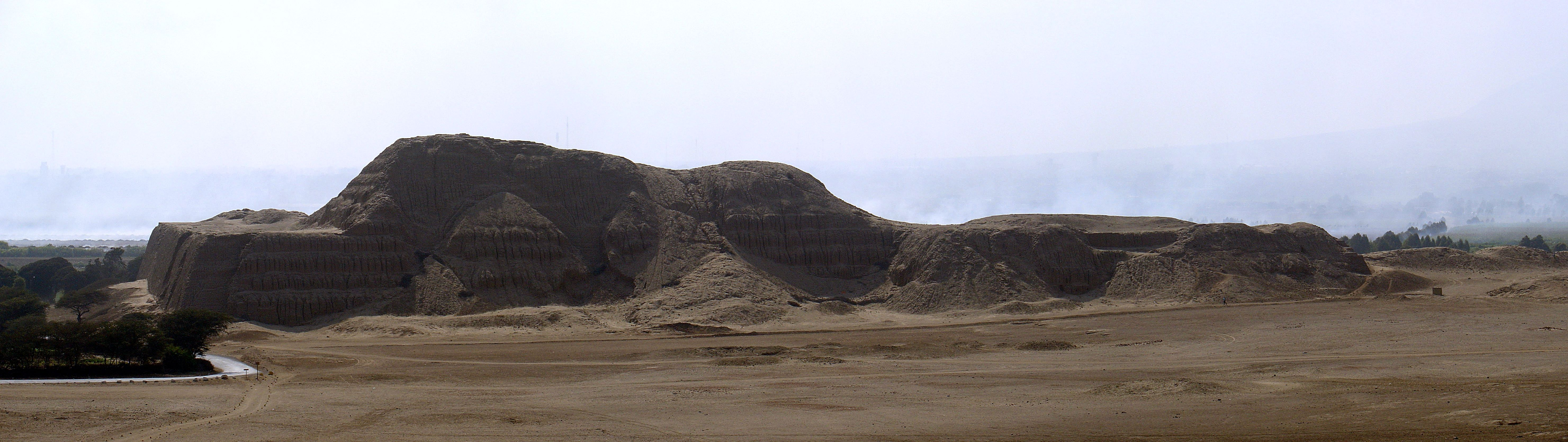
Panoramic view of the Archaeological site of Huaca del Sol (Temple of the sun, Mochica political capital, south of Trujillo city

The Moche Route is a tourist drive that begins in the Peruvian city of Trujillo in what once was the seat of power of the Moche culture known as The Temples of the Sun and the Moon and then goes through a series of places that were part of the kingdoms Moche and Chimu. The route runs along the northern Peruvian mainly through the regions called La Libertad and Lambayeque. In this route, are found the major archaeological sites in this area of Peru, belonging to the Moche culture. Recently the MINCETUR (Ministry of Tourism of Peru) has received the Ulysses Award for the promotion of this tourist route in 2011.

== Sites of the route ==
Some places of the Moche route are:

- Huanchaco
- Huaca del Sol
- Huaca de la Luna, etc.
- Trujillo
- Chiclayo
- Lord of Sipan
- El Brujo
- Huaca Esmeralda
- The Lady of Cao
- Pampa Grande

== See also ==
- History of Peru
- Pre-Inca cultures
- Huaca de la Luna
