= Lady of Cao =

Elite Moche culture individual

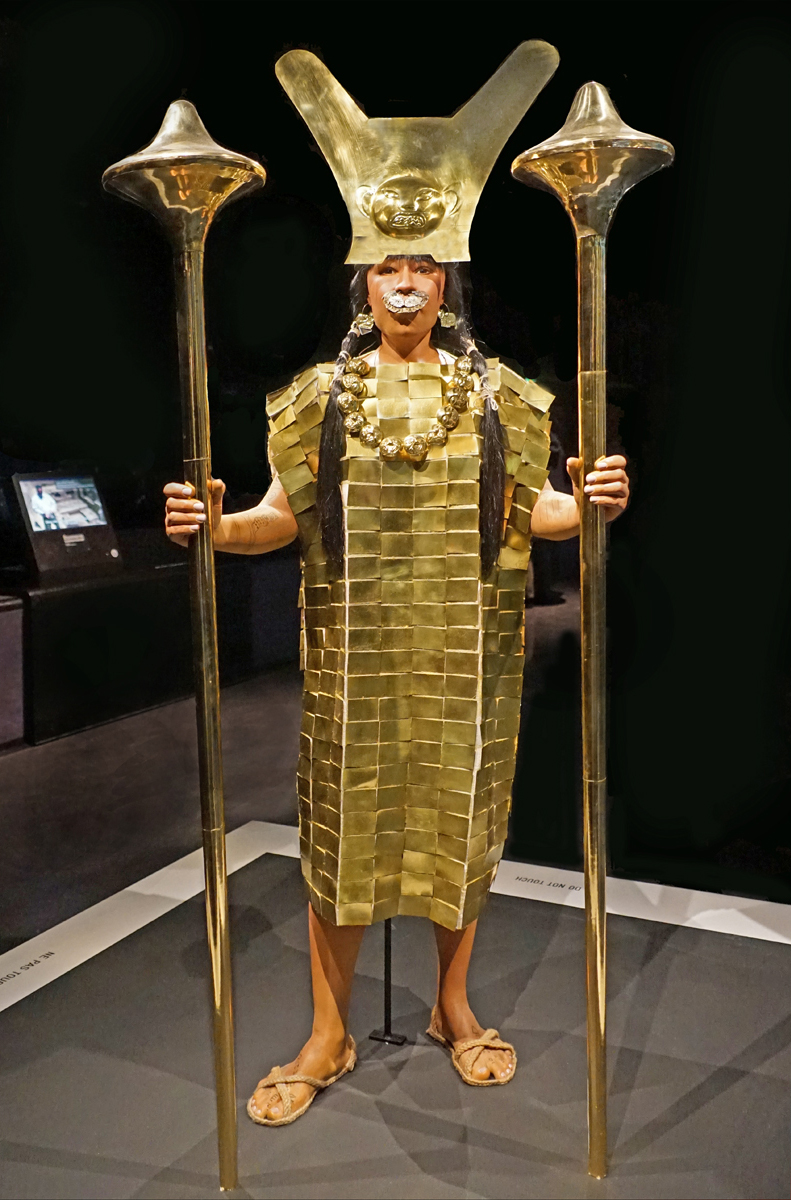
The Lady of Cao

The Lady of Cao is a name given to a female Moche mummy discovered at the archaeological site El Brujo, which is located about 45 km north of Trujillo in the La Libertad Region of Peru.

== Discovery ==
The Lady of Cao was discovered in 2006 by a team of Peruvian archaeologists led by Regulo Franco Jordan of the National Cultural Institute of Peru with the financial cooperation of the Augusto N. Wiese Foundation. The mummy, which was heavily tattooed and wrapped in many layers of cloth, was found with a number of ceremonial items, including weapons and jewelry. Also found were the remains of a second young woman, possibly a human sacrifice. A modern autopsy indicated that the Lady of Cao was in her mid twenties when she died and may have died of complications due to pregnancy or childbirth. The estimated date of death for the Lady of Cao is about 450 CE.

== Significance ==
The richness of the burial site, as well as the presence of weapons, suggest that the woman might have been a high ranking priestess or even a Moche ruler, possibly governing what is now known as the Chicama District region of northern Peru. Prior to this discovery, it was believed that only men held high rank in the Moche culture. The discovery of the Lady of Cao burial is compared with that of the Lord of Sipan in terms of important archeological discoveries relating to the Moche.

== Reconstruction ==
On 3 July 2017, culture officials and archaeologists unveiled a replica of her face. According to Peru's Ministry of Culture, the replica was made using 3D imaging technology and forensics archaeology based on her skull structure and ethnographic research which took 10 months to create.

== See also ==
- Huanchaco
- Huaca del Sol
- Huaca de la Luna
- Trujillo
- El Brujo
- Huaca Esmeralda
- History of Peru
- Pre-Inca cultures
