= Huaca del Dragón =

Archaeological site in Peru

Coordinates: 8.0765°S 79.0489°W

- Huaca del Arco Iris
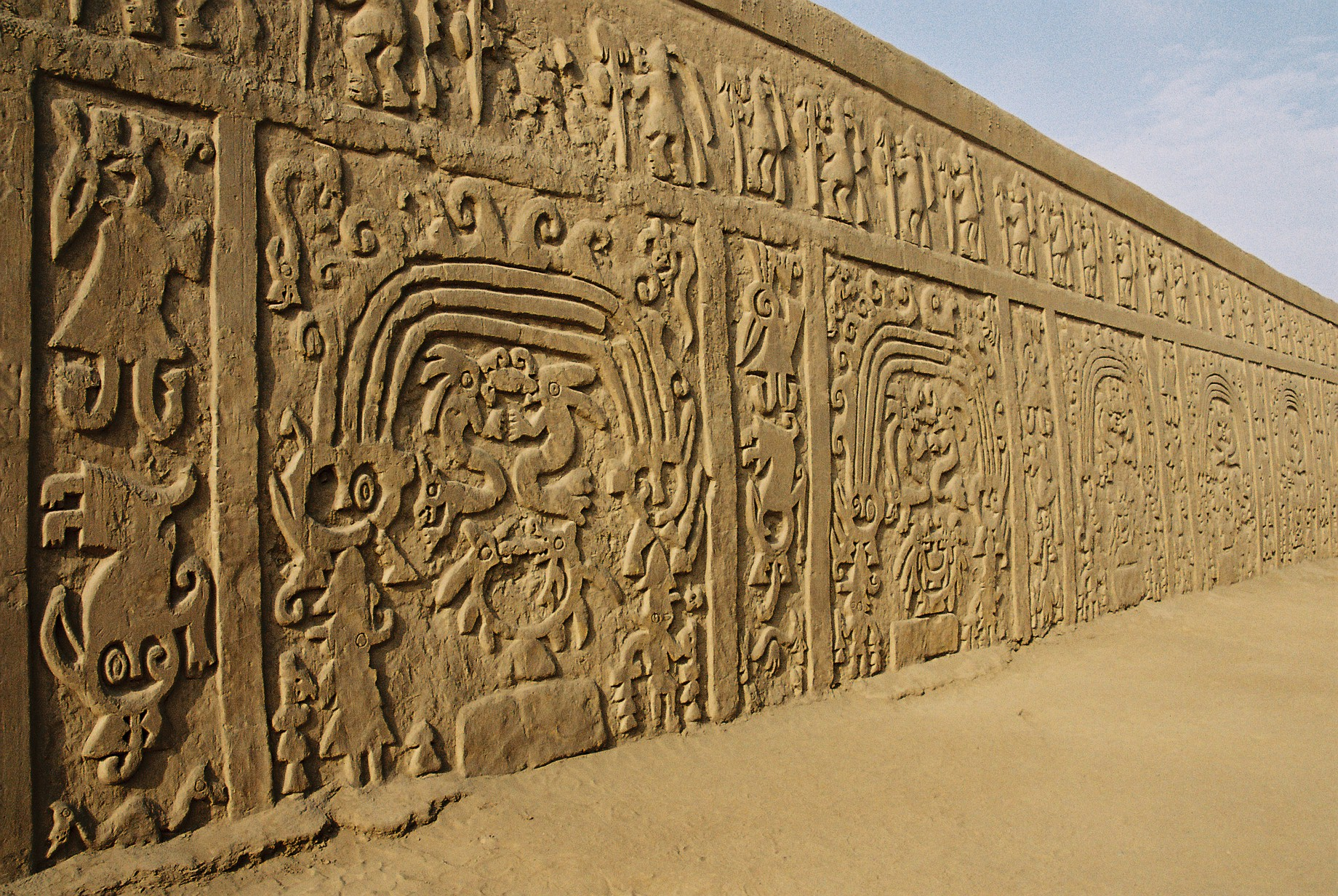
- Wall in the Huaca Dragon or Arco Iris.

- Location within Peru Location within South America
- Interactive map of Huaca del Dragón
- Type: Settlement
- Periods: Late Intermediate Period
- Cultures: Chimú
- Location: La Esperanza District, Trujillo Province, La Libertad Region, Peru
- Region: Moche Valley (Northern Peru)

History
- Abandoned: c. 1450

Site notes
- Material: Adobe
- Elevation: 77 m (253 ft)
- Area: 3,245 m^{2} (34,930 sq ft)
- Owner: Peruvian Government
- Public access: Yes

The Huaca del Dragon, also called Huaca del Arco Iris is an archeological site located in the Peruvian city of Trujillo, near Chan Chan. It is a large religious monument, administrative and ceremonial center. It is constructed of adobe, with murals decorated with friezes in relief showing human figures and representing a rainbow.

== Description ==
Upon entering the Huaca a ramp leads to the first level. Figures carved on the walls take the form of a dragon (hence its name). Another ramp, smaller than the first, leads to the second level. This level hosts pits, which were possibly used to store food.

== See also ==
- Iperu, tourist information and assistance
- Tourism in Peru
- Huaca del Sol
- Chan Chan
- Huaca Esmeralda
- Chimu
- Chotuna-Chornancap
