= Aiapæc =

Mochica deity

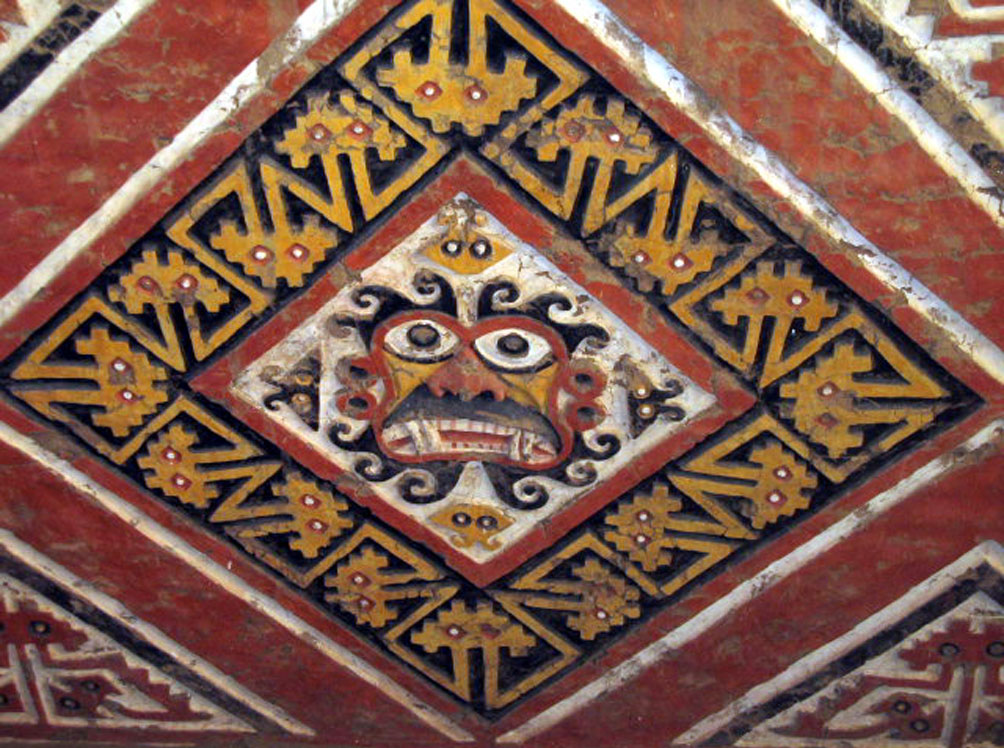
Aiapaec in a wall in the Huaca de la Luna

Aiapæc or Ai Apaec (Colonial Mochica: aiapæc, aiapäk *[ajapʷɨk] 'creator'), Wrinkled Face, the snake-belted figure, or the god of the mountains, is a mythical character identified in Moche iconography, and possibly the main Moche deity. According to some archaeologists, it may have been the most feared and adored of all punitive gods, worshipped as the creator god, protector of the Moche and provider of water, food and military triumphs.

The existence of such an iconographic character was first proposed by archaeologist Rafael Larco Hoyle. Contemporary analyses have questioned that it may have been a single god, instead finding several mythological characters. In addition, the name aiapæc is anachronistic, first applied to the Christian god by colonial Spanish grammarians.

== Representations ==
The most common representation of Aiapæc is the one seen in the murals of the Temples of the Sun and the Moon, which present an anthropomorphic face with feline fangs surrounded by ocean waves.

Aiapæc was represented in several ways, depending on the period, place and medium used. In metallurgy, for example, Aiapæc is often seen as a spider with eight legs and an anthropomorphic face with jaguar fangs. In ceramics, the divinity is often more anthropomorphic, usually with his head in his hands and sometimes with two snakes sprouting from his head. In sculpture, he is shown with a staff.

It is said that during human sacrifices, prisoners were decapitated and their heads given to Aiapæc.

== See also ==
- Cultural depictions of spiders
- Jaguars in culture and mythology
- El Brujo
- Moche culture
- Huanchaco
- Trujillo, Peru
- Ai Apaec (comics)
