= Huaca de la Luna =

Archaeological site in Peru

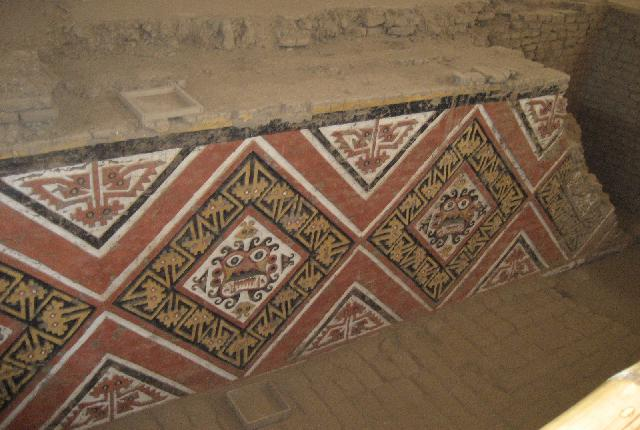
- The moche deity Ai apaec (decapitador) on a wall inside the temple or Huaca of the Moon

- Location within Peru Location within South America
- Interactive map of Huaca de la Luna
- 8°08′06″S 78°59′29″W
- Type: Settlement
- Periods: Early Intermediate
- Cultures: Moche
- Location: Moche District, Trujillo Province, La Libertad Region, Peru
- Region: Moche valley (North of Peru)
- Part of: Huacas of Moche

History
- Built by: Moche culture

Site notes
- Material: Adobe
- Elevation: 41 m (135 ft)
- Owner: Peruvian Government
- Public access: Yes

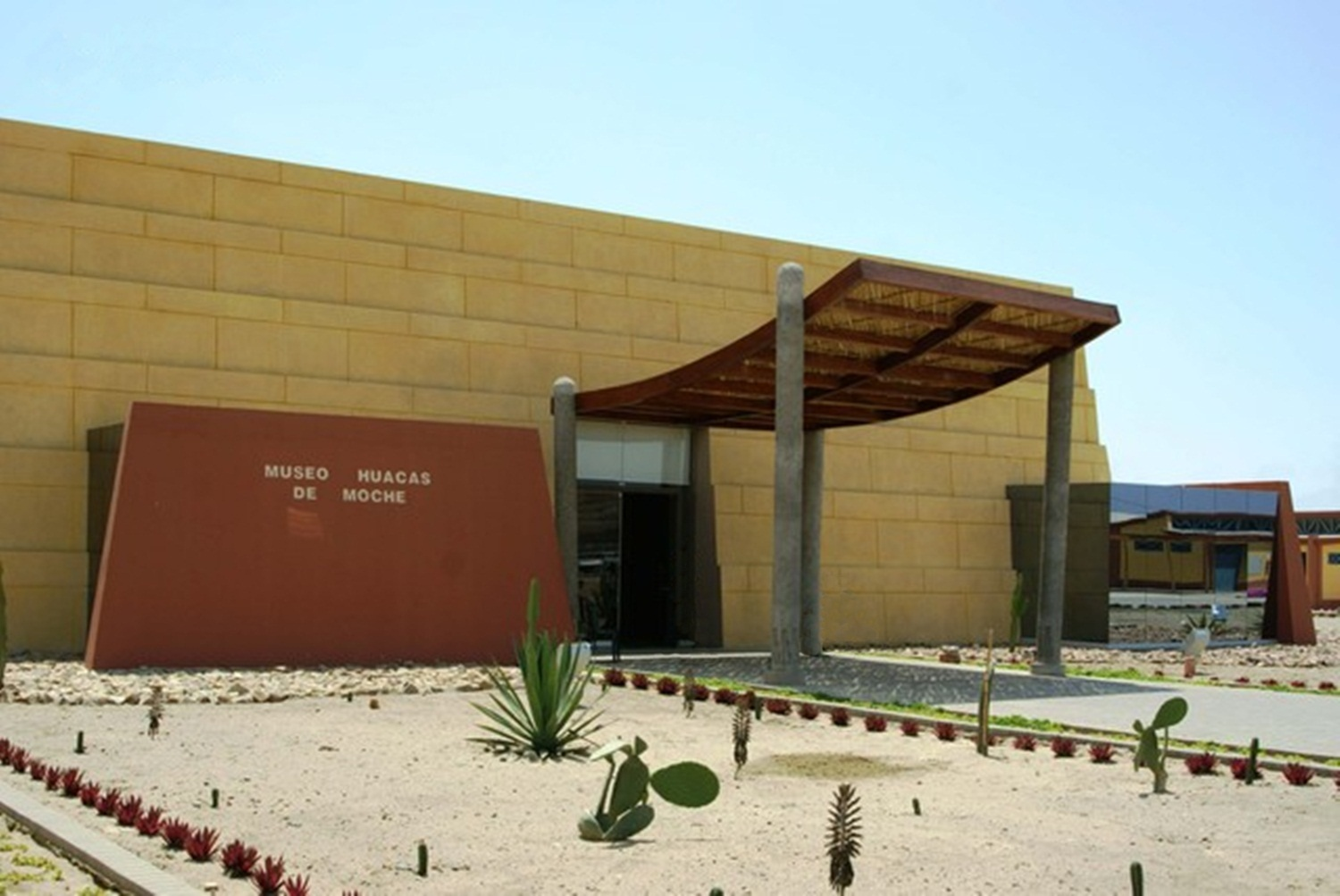
Museum Huacas of Moche

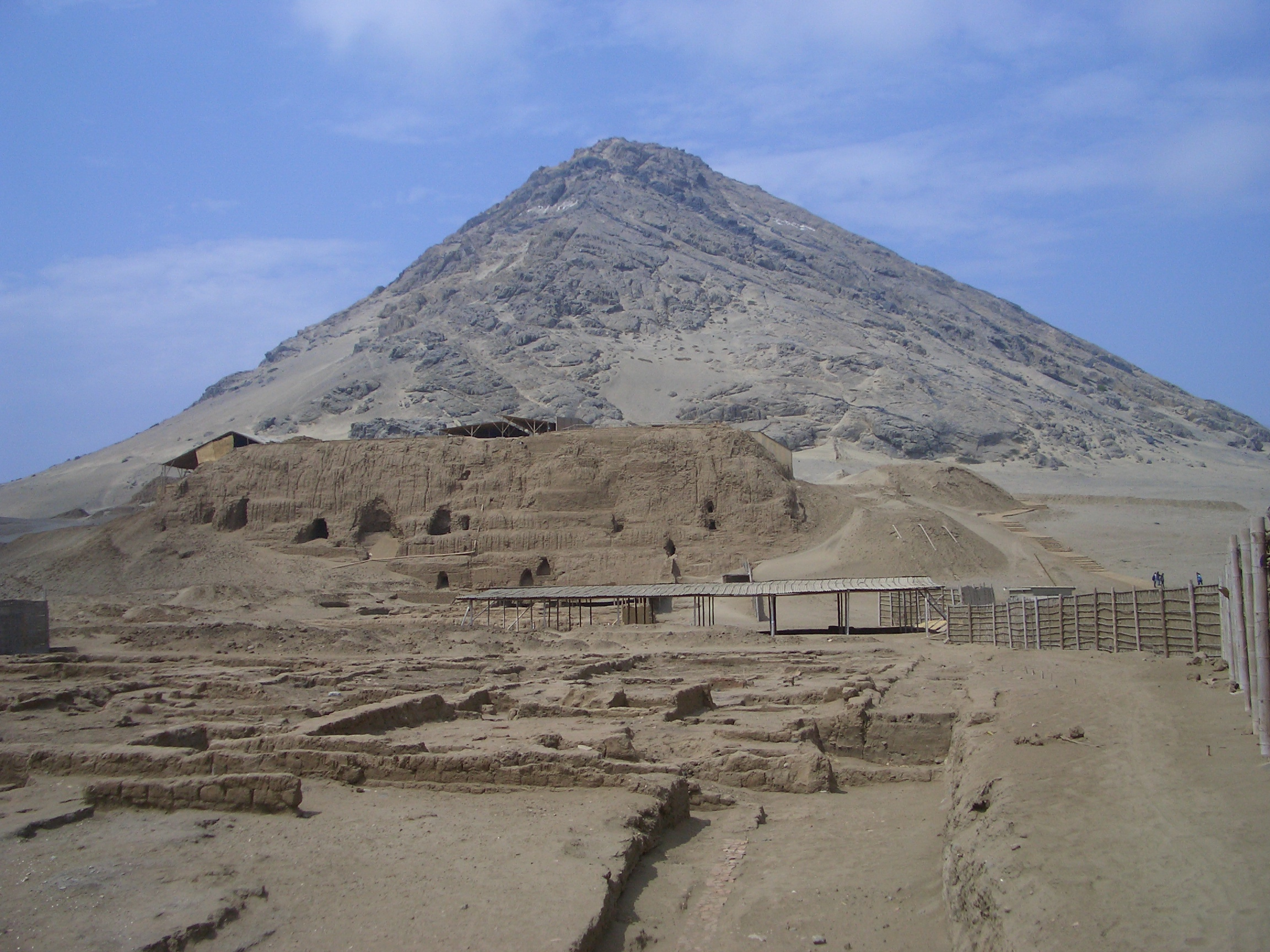
A view of the Huaca de la Luna, with Cerro Blanco in the background

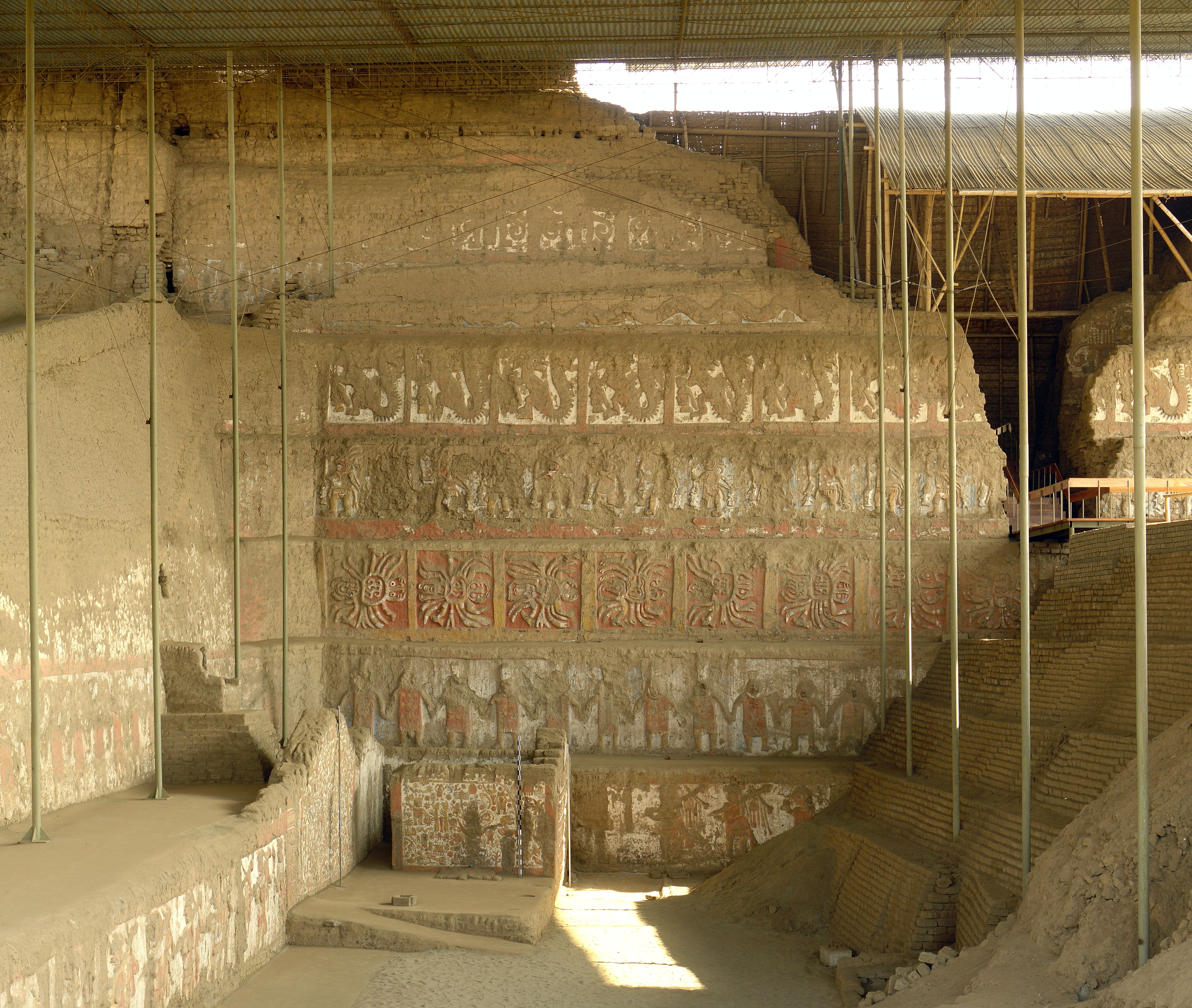
The main mural of the Huaca de la Luna

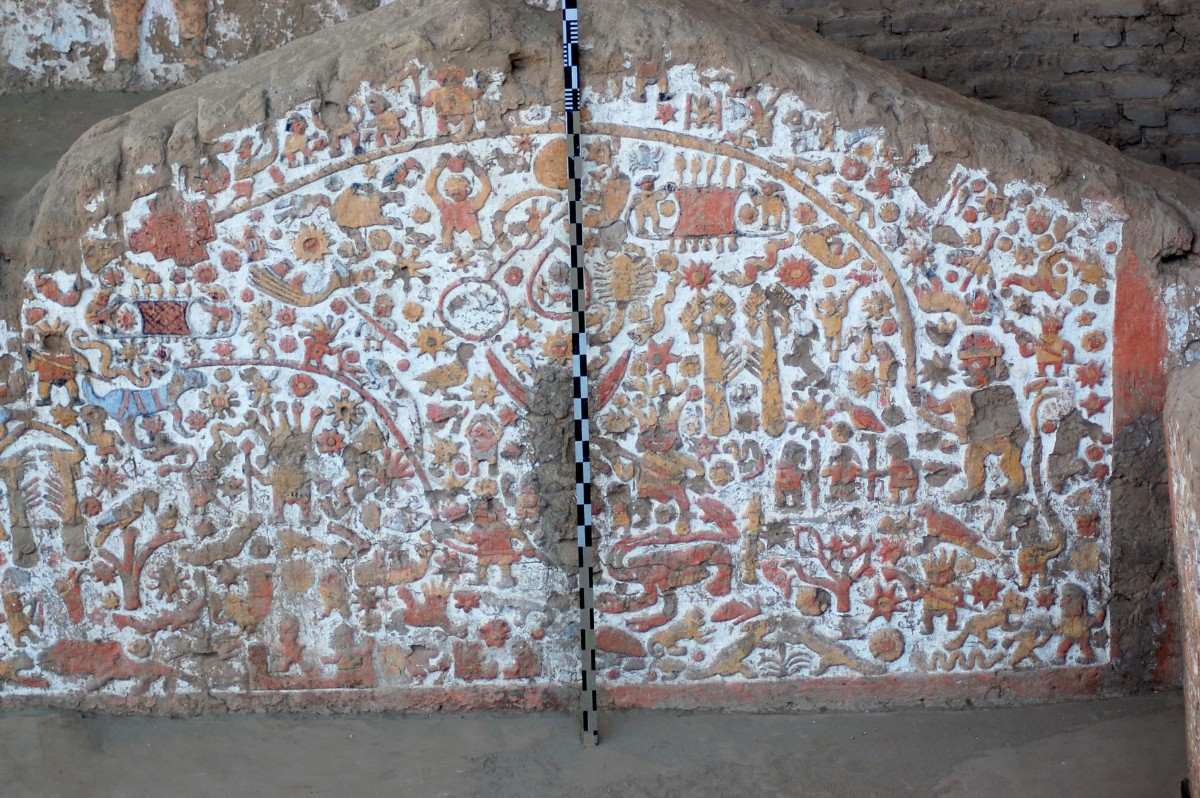
Lower right panel, Moche culture, pre-Columbian

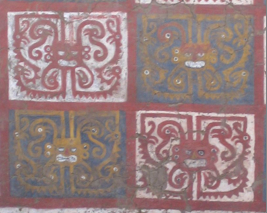
Mural detail, Ai-Apaec (Ayapec), Huaca de la Luna

Huaca de la Luna ("Temple or Shrine of the Moon") is a large adobe brick structure built mainly by the Moche people of northern Peru. It sits roughly 5 kilometers from the Pacific Ocean, 4 km from the modern city of Trujillo, and near the mouth of the Moche River. The site was inhabited between the 1st and 9th century AD. Along with Huaca del Sol, Huaca de la Luna is part of Huacas de Moche. The Huacas are major components of the ancient Moche capital city of Cerro Blanco.

== Background ==
The Huaca de la Luna, although it is the smaller of the two huacas at the site, has yielded the most archaeological information. Although Huaca del Sol was partially destroyed and looted by Spanish conquistadors in the seventeenth century, Huaca de la Luna was left relatively untouched. Archaeologists believe that the Huaca del Sol may have served for administrative, military, and residential functions, as well as a burial mound for the Moche elite. Huaca de la Luna served primarily a ceremonial and religious function, although it contains burials as well.

The Huaca de la Luna is a large complex of three main platforms, each one serving a different function. The northernmost platform, at one time brightly decorated with a variety of murals and reliefs, was destroyed by looters. The surviving central and southeastern platforms have been the focus of most excavations. Platform I has yielded multiple high-status burials. Evidence of human sacrifices have also been found extensively at Huaca de la Luna.

== Structure ==
=== Layout ===
The site is composed of three pyramids and several plazas. The largest is Platform I, with a height of 30 meters. Excavation has revealed that a new platform was constructed over an existing platform every 100 years during six centuries. Due north of Platform I is Plaza 1. It is a large, low, open space, and was likely used to hold large crowds during significant events. Within Plaza 1 was Recinto 1. Recinto 1 was an elaborately decorated building that sat on an elevated platform. This building included murals of warriors and prisoners being led. East of Plaza 1 and northeast of Platform I is Plaza 2. It is smaller and higher than Plaza 1, but overlooks the same space; this is indicative of some form of social stratification. Directly east of Platform I are Plazas 3A, 3B, and 3C. They are interconnected and the closest in elevation to Platform I of any of the plazas. Human sacrifices were practiced in Plazas 3A/B/C. East of Plaza 3A is the much smaller Platform II. North of Platform II, sits Platform III. It is unknown what function these portions of the site served.

=== Materials ===
Huaca de la Luna, was constructed from adobe bricks. Adjacent adobes are similar in size, and all are wider than they are tall. Many of the adobes have one of 128 distinct markings, identifying which of the surrounding communities produced each brick. Adorning interior walls of the site are 10,000 square meters of polychromatic murals. The polychromatic paints and pigments used by the Moche are derived from minerals such as hematite (red) and clay (white), and organic sources. Depictions of the Moche deity Ai-Apaec, also known as Ayapec, are common. Ayapec is a Muchik word translating as all knowing. (Note: The name "Ayapec" or "Ai - Apaec" is a modern artifact. When Larco Hoyle asked his workers about how would be "the highest god" in Muchik, they answered him that it would be "Ai - Apaec". For that reason Larco Hoyle stated, that it was the name for the Moche supreme deity. He ignored also that in the pre-Columbian Moche Valley the spoken language was not Muchik, but Quingnam. "Wrinkle-Face" is the name given to another deity by the later Inca because of the deity's appearance.)

== Art ==
Moche artwork was often shown in their ceramics and pottery. It depicted daily life and ceremonies. A hierarchy was often shown in architectural vessels. For example, more significant and sacred figures were created in 3D, with less significant figures shown in 2D.

One architectural vessel found includes 2D foxes running in a spiral upwards, with 3D snails underneath. Another popular vessel includes a double gabled roof and war club roof combs. Towards the bottom, there are four warriors with a prisoner.

Another architectural vessel found at Huaca de la Luna included figures of nude prisoners with ropes around their necks in Plaza 1. There are also figures of warriors carrying the prisoners' weapons.

Architectural vessels would often tell a story with warriors and prisoners. They would also include various temples and buildings. These buildings found in the artwork resembled actual Moche buildings and included much detail. For example, many pots included temples with different roof decorations, like war clubs, which resembled the actual building.

== Religious and Sacrificial Usages of Huaca de la Luna ==
=== Sacrifices ===
The eastern platform, black rock, and adjacent patios were the sites of human sacrifice rituals. Human sacrifice rituals were likely more complex than previously thought, and likely were done for two main fertility rituals: agrarian (crop prosperity and natural disasters, and social (wartime) motivated sacrifices. These are depicted in a variety of Moche graphic representations, most notably painted ceramics. The sacrifices differed in practice in accordance with their given purposes. Wartime sacrifices were often lower class, or captured prisoners of war. Researchers discovered multiple skeletons of adult males at the foot of the rock, all of whom show signs of trauma and imprisonment. Many had bone fractures, further indicating trauma during wartime, but the fatal injury was most often a severe blow to the head. After the sacrifice, bodies of victims would be hurled over the side of the Huaca and left exposed in the patios. There is current debate on how these victims were obtained—whether through staged war games, actual combat between communities, or both. The reason for this is that while there is bioarchaeological evidence of warfare between multiple communities, and along with this, the lack of respect given to the bodied found (there was evidence that the bodies were not buried after death) could possibly indicate that they were fighters from other communities. On the other hand, Moche sacrificial artwork and murals do not depict wartime victories over other groups, the soldiers fighting in the murals look relatively similar to each other.

=== Ritual sacrifices with possible relation to the El Niño disaster ===
El Niño is characterized by long periods of flooding, followed by long periods of drought. This natural disaster greatly impacts Peruvian agriculture and life. Huaca de la Luna was greatly affected by these periods. Archaeological evidence shows certain sacrifices that line up with specific El Niño periods. The dirt composition around the sacrifices could indicate that the bodies were buried in particularly muddy conditions, and may have been damaged/ shifted by floodwater. These sacrificial rituals were done differently than the wartime mediated ones, with the cause of death most often being a clean cut to the neck, and the de-fleshing and presentation of the sacrifice. There is also evidence of the sacrifice of children, possibly acting as offerings following the completion of a temple. While many of the sacrifices line up with El Niño, there is no conclusive evidence that the ritual killings were done for El Niño—that is to say that we cannot assume causation over correlation.

== Huaca de La Luna in the modern day ==
Archaeological excavation began at the site in the 1990s following aerial photographic surveys of the site in the late 1980s. Wind had covered the site in sand, so the structure and interior of the pyramids are well preserved.

The World Monuments Fund has been working at Huaca de la Luna to support needed conservation work. This includes ongoing assessments, documentation, stabilization, and consolidation of excavated architectural and decorative elements. Similarly, the Huaca del Sol y de la Luna project, has helped grow the Peruvian economy by creating jobs while also acting as a training ground for up and coming archaeologists and conservationists.

== See also ==
- El Brujo
- Moche culture
- Huanchaco
- Chan Chan
