= Countryside of Moche =

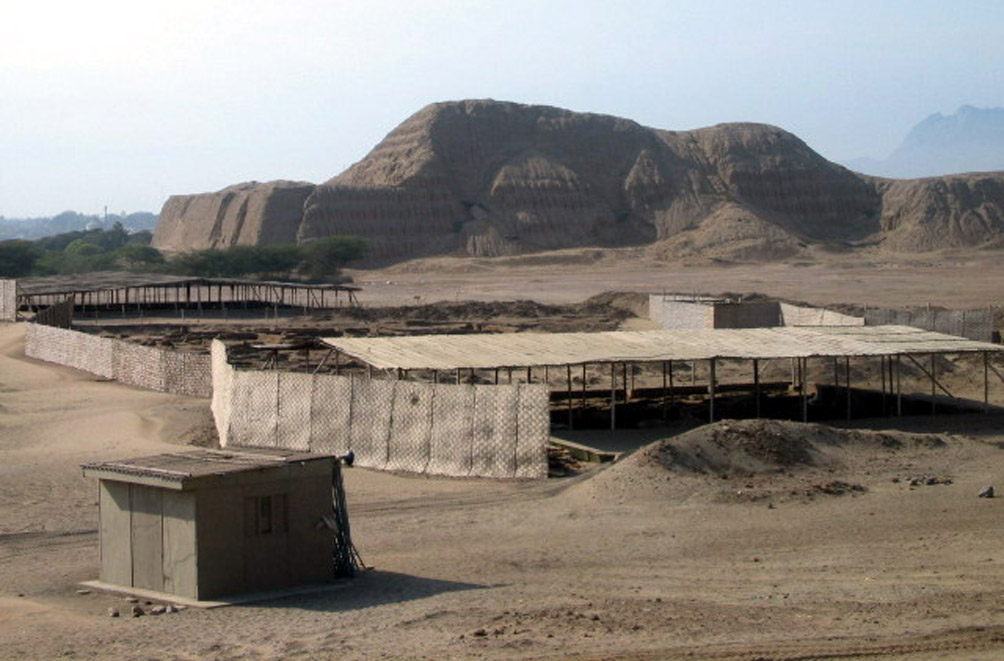
In the countryside of Moche is located the Huaca del Sol, a mochica archeological site

The Countryside of Moche is an area of Trujillo city inherited from mochica culture. It is located in the Moche District about 4 km south of the Historic Centre of Trujillo. Today it is a tourist area that presents recreational centers, agricultural areas and alongside this countryside. The Temples of the Sun and Moon is located in it. It is part of the Moche or Santa Catalina valley and was a place of development in the Moche culture.

== Description ==
In the countryside of Moche one can appreciate the lifestyle of mocheros, expressed in the manufacture of pottery, leatherwork, wood and stone carvings, basketry, and others, as in its cuisine or gastronomy, expressed in local dishes like theologian soup, pepián of turkey, and regional as ceviche, goat, and duck stew. One can also appreciate the landscape where traditional growers highlight their crops and gardens. The farmers of the countryside of Moche celebrate the festival of San Isidro Labrador.

== See also ==
- San Jose Festival
- Las Delicias beach
- Moche (culture)
