= Moche River =

River in Peru

Rio Moche
- Location of mouth

Location
- Country: Peru
- Region: La Libertad Region

Physical characteristics
- Source
  - location: Laguna Grande
- Mouth: Pacific Ocean
  - coordinates: 8°09′44″S 79°02′05″W

The Moche River is one of the rivers of the Pacific Ocean slope, located in the northern coast of Peru, in La Libertad Region. On both sides of this river is the millenary Moche Valley. The Moche river goes through east to west the metropolitan area of Trujillo and its mouth is located in the Pacific Ocean in the limits of Moche and Victor Larco both towns of Trujillo city.

== Description ==
The river rises in Laguna Grande about 3988 m near the village of Quiruvilca, with the name of Rio Grande, later adopting the names of the San Lorenzo river and Constancia river. At the height of the town of San Juan, about 14 km from its origin, takes its name of Moche River, which retains the same to its mouth at the sea.

== See also ==
- Moche (culture)
- Trujillo
- Valley of Moche
- Countryside of Moche
- Moche city
- List of rivers of Peru
- List of rivers of the Americas by coastline
