= San José Festival =

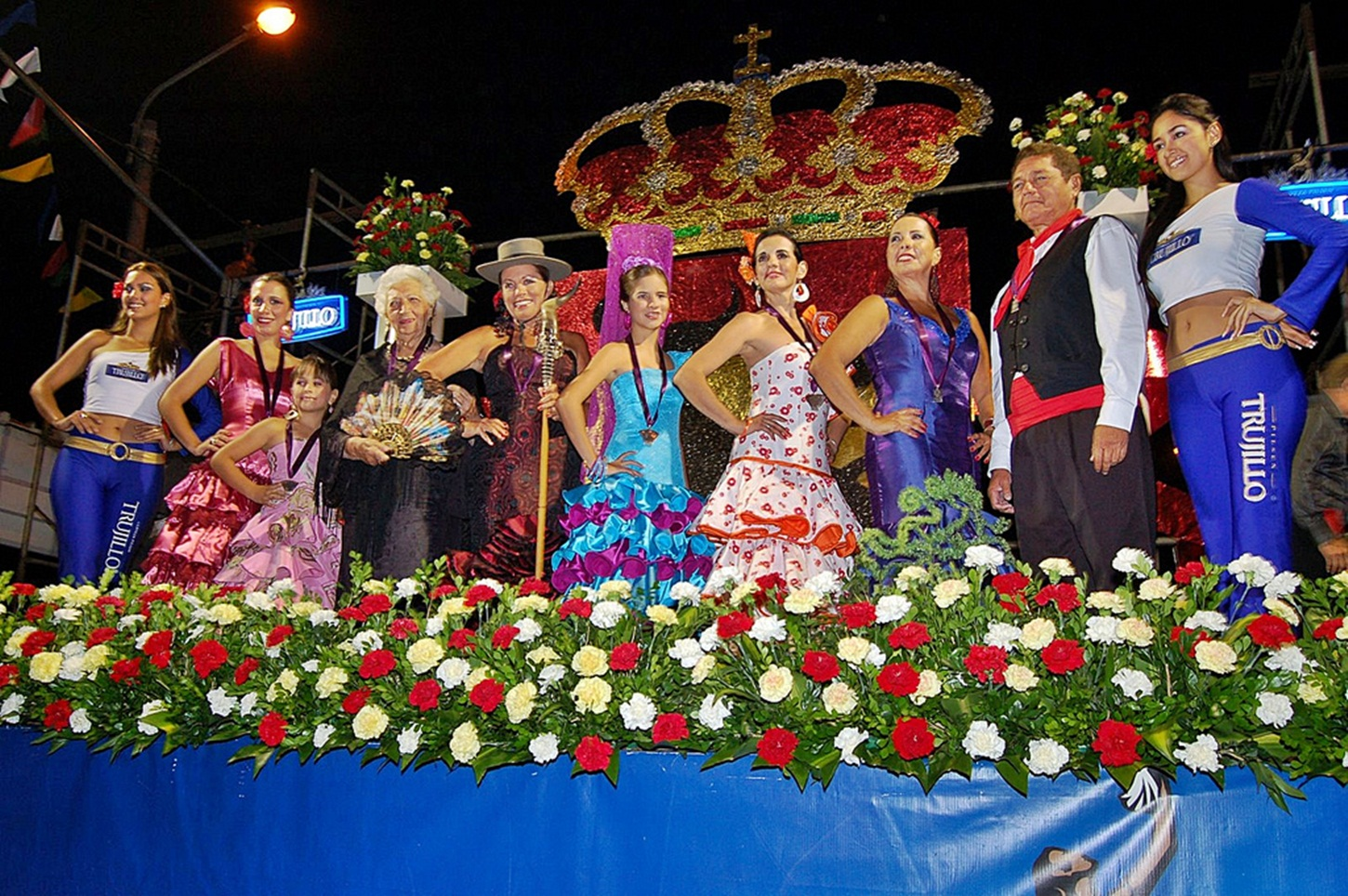
- Some characters in San José Festival: Miss Maja and Lady Maja
- Genre: Traditional Festival
- Location: Las Delicias (Trujillo city)
- Years active: 1993 - present
- Website: http://www.feriasanjoseperu.com/2012/

San José Festival is a Peruvian patronal feast, it is held in the resort called Las Delicias beach in the district of Moche near Trujillo city and the central day is 19 March, the celebrations last a week more or less; these days are of feast and it has been a tradition with a strong Spanish influence, which are enjoyed various activities for adults, youth and children, party hosts are Don Jose and Doña Josefa and Ms Maja, the event begins with the description of characters, activities, bars, flamenco dancing, etc. This festival is accompanied by a procession of the patron Saint Joseph, the fashion show, the bullfighting, the parade of characters, and toromatch pamplonada in which involved several teams from other regions of the country. Some houses are become in Spanish bars decorated with motifs like flags, grimaldas and posters.

== History ==
This festival is celebrated in Moche District since the year 1993 in Las Delicias Beach located around 10 km south Trujillo city. This celebration is held in honor of its patron Saint Joseph and it is characterized by joy and color, the festival was created by Mariana de Orbegoso, who developed the idea for to get a moment transported to Spain by converting the original residences in tascas Spanish motif as banners, garlands and other allegories to the rhythm of tunas, flamenco dancing, Iberian cuisine and drink, etc.

== Characters of the festival ==
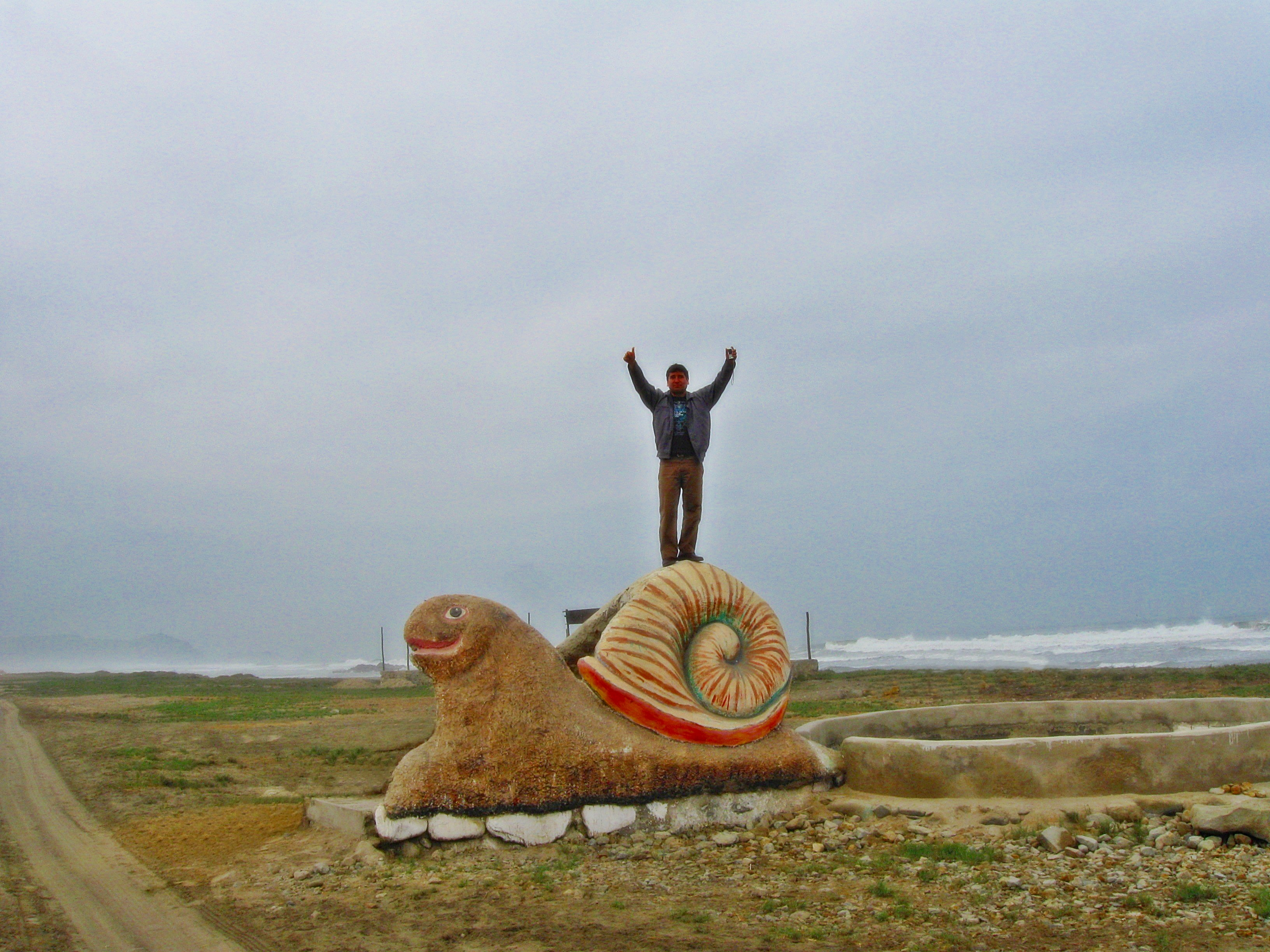
Tourist in San Jose Festival

The characters wear traditional Spanish dresses and they preside the festival, they are:

- Lady Mayorees (alcaldesa)
- Lady Abanico, abanico is a hand fan popular in Spain
- Mr. José
- Mrs. Josefa
- Lady Maja
- Miss Maja
- Teen Maja
- Kid Maja

== Events ==
- Running of the Bulls, is a practice that involves running in front of a small group (typically a dozen) of bulls that have been let loose, on a course of a sectioned-off subset of Las Delicias's streets.
- Bullfighting, with the presence of toreros of the country.
- Procession of the patron Saint Joseph in the streets of the town.
- Toromatch, in this event groups of young people join in circles to be attacked by a bull, the winner is the group with more resistance.

== Peruvian paso Competition ==
During San Jose festival at middle March there is a peruvian paso competition. Trujillo is known and considered as the Cradle of the typical Peruvian Paso Horse as well as the Capital of Culture of Peru so as the Capital of the Marinera dance and as the city of the everlasting spring.

Peruvian paso
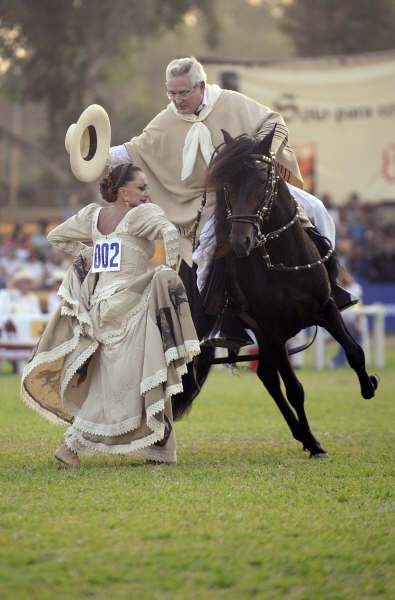
Peruvian paso in a show of marinera dance.

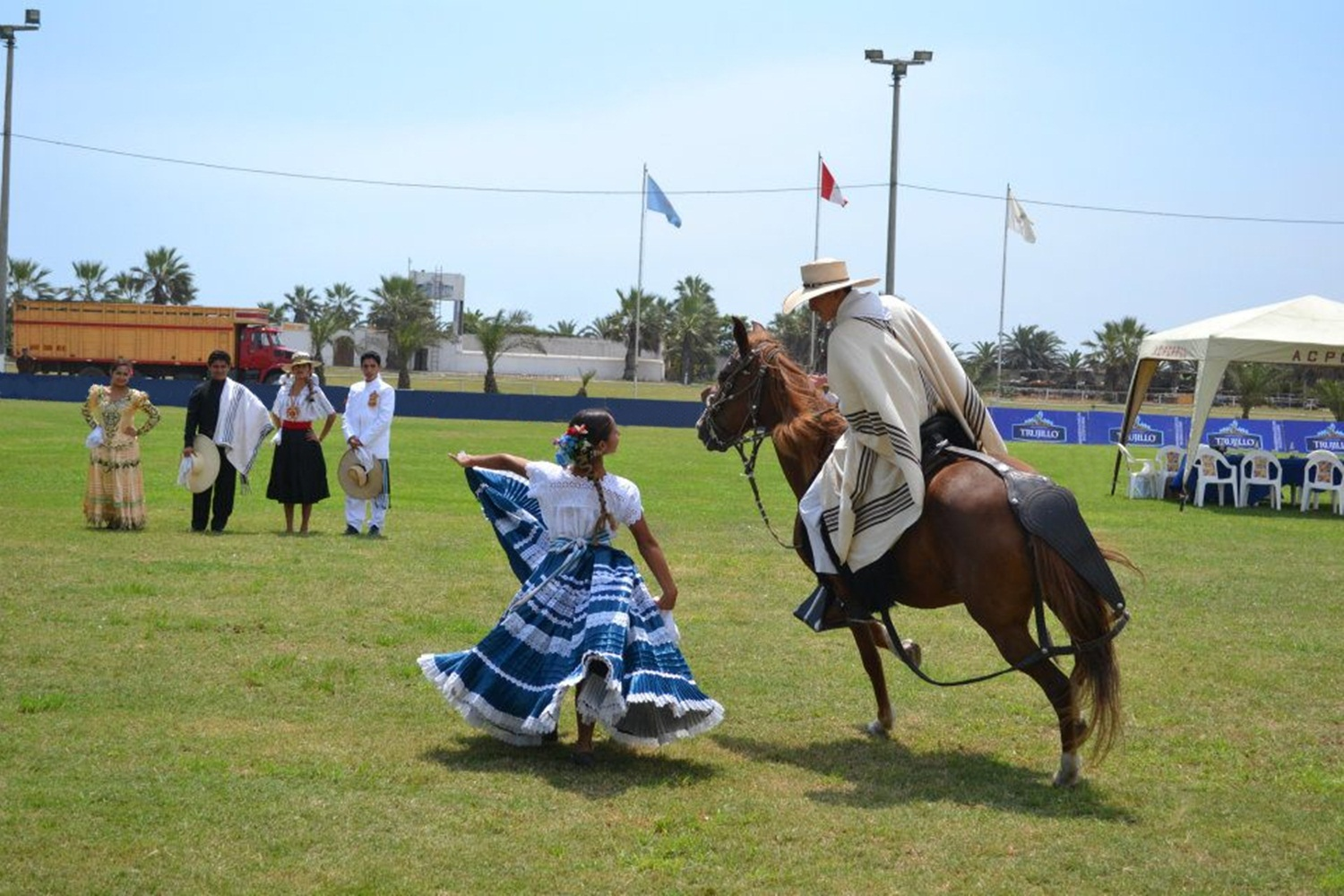
Peruvian paso in a show with a lady during a contest

== See also ==
- Trujillo
- Moche city
- Marinera Festival
- Trujillo Spring Festival
- Trujillo Book Festival
- International Festival of Lyric Singing
- Carnival of Huanchaco
- Las Delicias beach
- Huanchaco
- Santiago de Huamán
- Victor Larco Herrera District
