= Huaca Esmeralda =

Archaeological site in Peru

Coordinates: 8.1046°S 79.0474°W

Huaca La Esmeralda
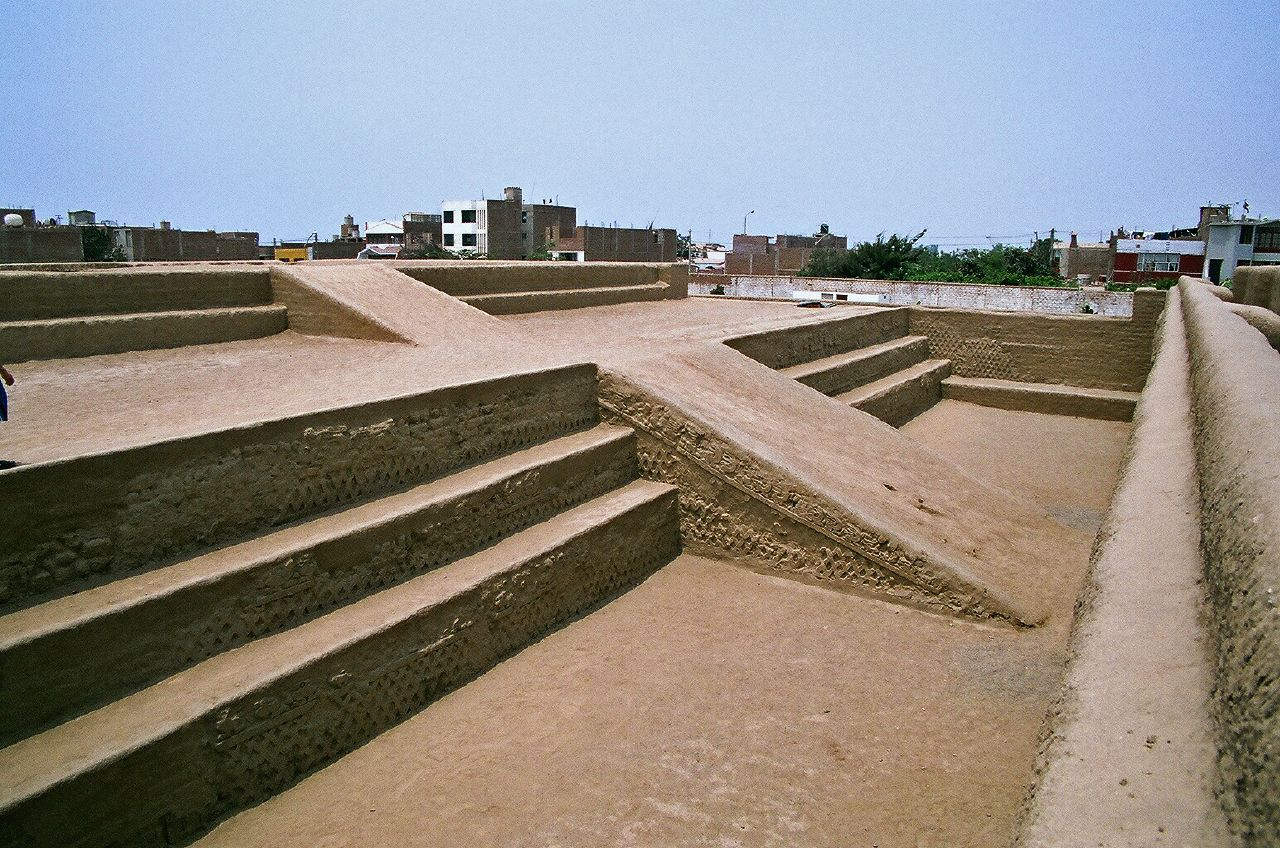
- Huaca La Esmeralda.

- Location within Peru Location within South America
- Interactive map of Huaca La Esmeralda
- Type: Settlement
- Periods: Late Intermediate Period
- Cultures: Chimú
- Location: Trujillo District, Trujillo province, La Libertad Region, Peru
- Region: Moche Valley (Northern Peru)

Site notes
- Material: Adobe
- Elevation: 32 m (105 ft)
- Area: 2,600 m^{2} (28,000 sq ft)
- Owner: Peruvian Government
- Public access: Yes

The Huaca La Esmeralda is an archaeological building belonging to the Chimu culture, is located in the Peruvian city of Trujillo. It is estimated that the adobe construction was done during the first stage of development of the Chimu culture, in close link with the capital Chan Chan. It occupies an area of approximately 2,600 square meters.

== Chimú shrine ==
It is said the Huaca La Esmeralda could have been the palace of a great Chimú lord of the Mansiche area. Its architecture has three terraces adorned with zoomorphic and geometric figures (diamonds) all in relief, has a fairly steep ramp that connects its two levels.

Huaca meaning ceremonial cup. Huaca La Esmeralda translates as the ceremonial cup of Esmeralda. With little archaeological study done at this site, it seems unclear as to who Esmeralda was and how it was given that name.

== See also ==
- Iperu, tourist information and assistance
- Tourism in Peru
- Huaca del Sol
- Chan Chan
- Huaca del Dragón
