= El Brujo =

Archaeological site in Peru

El Brujo Archaeological Complex
- Complejo arqueológico El Brujo
- El Brujo
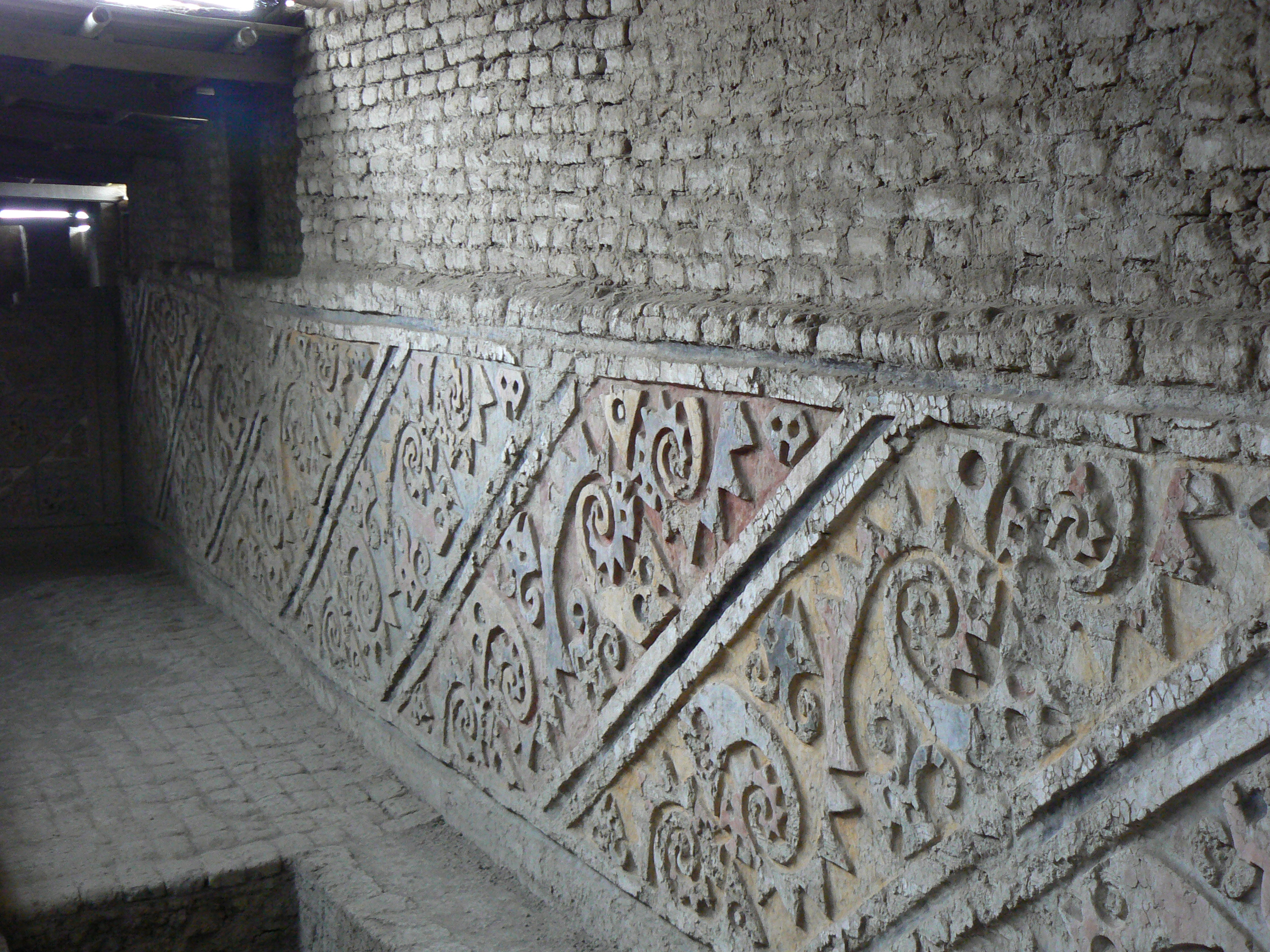
- Bas-relief patterns at El Brujo

- Location within Peru Location within South America
- Interactive map of El Brujo Archaeological Complex
- 7°54′54″S 79°18′20″W
- Type: Settlement
- Periods: Early Intermediate, Middle Horizon, Late Intermediate Period.
- Cultures: Moche, Sican or Lambayeque and Chimú
- Location: Magdalena de Cao District, Ascope Province, La Libertad Region, Peru
- Region: Chicama valley (North of Peru)

History
- Built by: Moche culture

Site notes
- Material: Adobe
- Elevation: 28 m (92 ft)
- Owner: Peruvian Government
- Public access: Yes

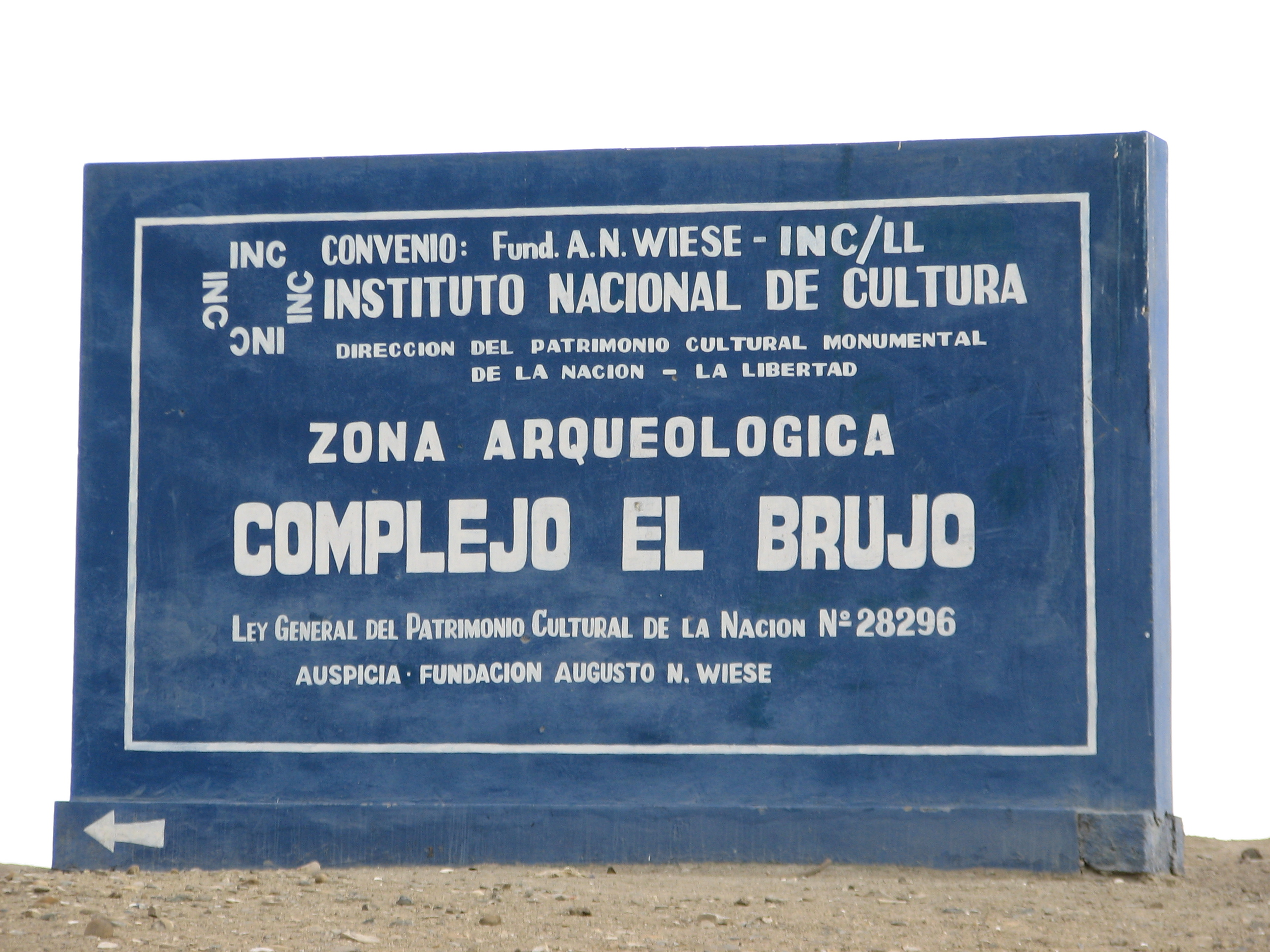
INC (National Institute of Culture) sign at the El Brujo complex

The El Brujo Archaeological Complex is an ancient archaeological site, located in the Chicama Valley just north of Trujillo, La Libertad Province, Peru, that was occupied from preceramic times. Considering the broad cultural sequencing, the Chicama Valley can be considered as an archaeological microcosm. Research at the site benefits from the favourable environmental and topological conditions for material conservation.

Huaca Prieta is the earliest part of the complex but the biggest constructions on the site belong to the Moche culture. In this area, there are also the remains of the later Lambayeque and Chimú cultures.

== Early Intermediate Period ==
The development of the Brujo Archaeological Complex during the Intermediate Period falls within a context of early complex societies construction. During the Moche era, monumental religious and socio-political centers usually named huacas were built. Although the architecture, the iconography and the practice of sacrifice relate the Brujo Complex to a ceremonial, ritual and funerary site, the constructions are considered as the result of labor the “caciques” controlled. The huacas of the Early Intermediate Period (200 B.C. 600 A.D.) seem to have exerted a polymorphous and centrifugal power, yet the complex is located in a difficult weather condition area.

The Brujo Complex is represented by three major huacas. The Huaca Prieta mound dates back to the preceramic times. Huaca Cortada and Huaca Cao Viejo (the largest) are stepped truncated pyramids constructed at the northern corners of the terrace during the Early Intermediate Period. Building archaeology unveils seven phases of construction spanning the early and middle phases of Moche era.

Huaca Cao Viejo is famous for its polychrome reliefs and mural paintings, and the discovery of the Señora de Cao, whose remains are currently the earliest evidence for a female ruler in Peru. Both appeared in National Geographic magazine in July 2004 and June 2006. The site officially opened to the public in May 2006, and a museum exhibition was proposed for 2007.

== Post-Moche Era ==
The abandonment of the Huacas at the end of the Early Intermediate Period could have been linked to the political instability and upheavals of the Southern sphere of the Moche. Some archaeologists also point out the extreme climatic events at the end of the Intermediate Period that could have led to the decline of the culture. However, the information relating to the end of the period are limited. The Lambayeque Culture arose in the Chicama Valley around 900 A.D. before being successively incorporated in the Chimu and the Inca expansive empires. Nevertheless, The Brujo Archaeological Complex remained a ceremonial and funerary area dedicated to the collective memory.

== 17th-century ==
A 17th-century letter found during excavations at the site may contain translations of numbers written in Quingnam (sometimes known as Pescadora) using the decimal system, the first physical evidence for the existence of this language. Archaeologists believe that the language was influenced by Quechua, an ancient tongue still spoken by millions of people across the Andes.

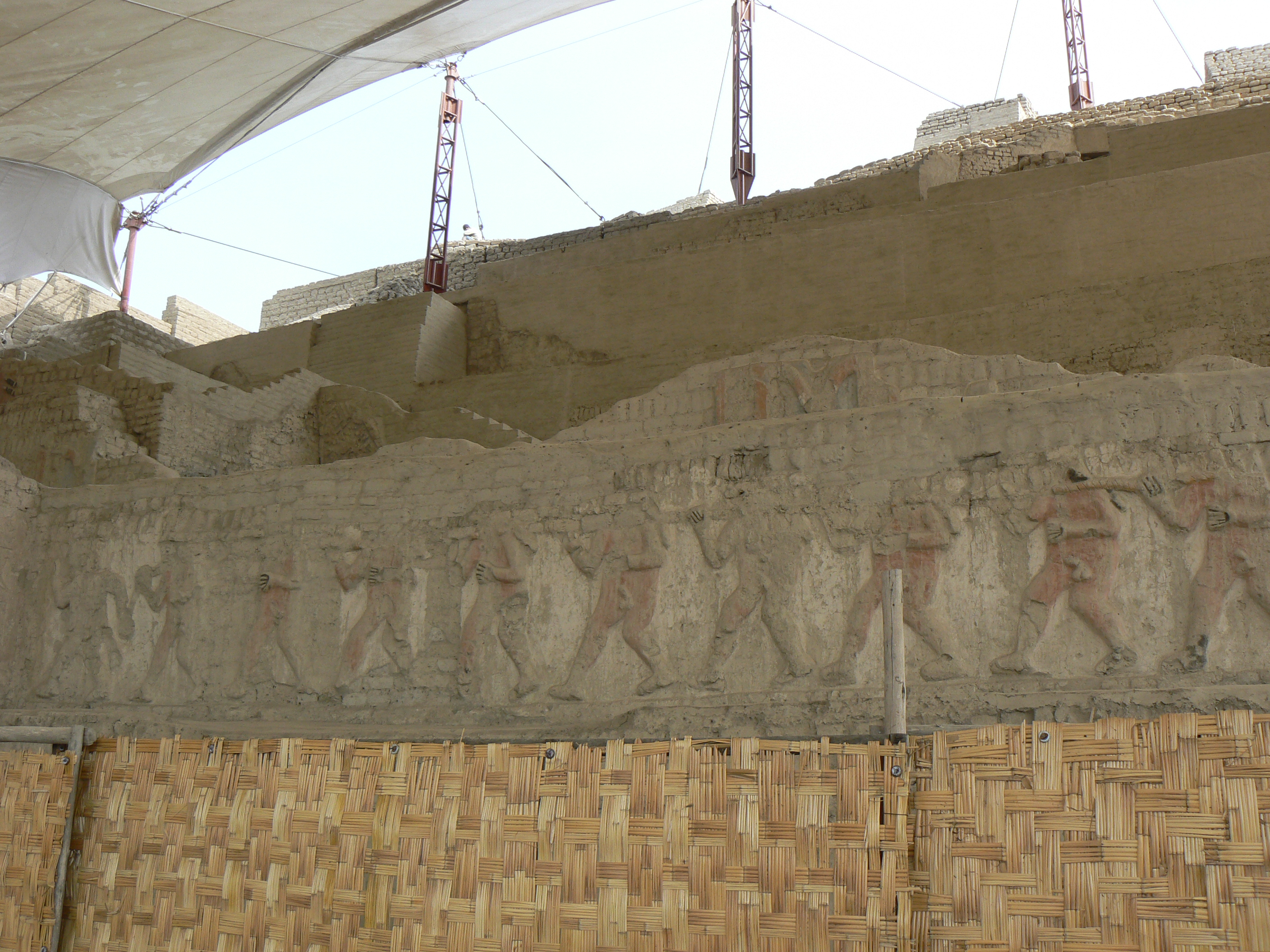
Naked prisoners being led by warrior at El Brujo in El Brujo complex

== See also ==
- Moche
- Sipán
- Trujillo, Peru
- Huanchaco
