= Moche, Trujillo =

City in La Libertad Region, Peru

Moche
- City
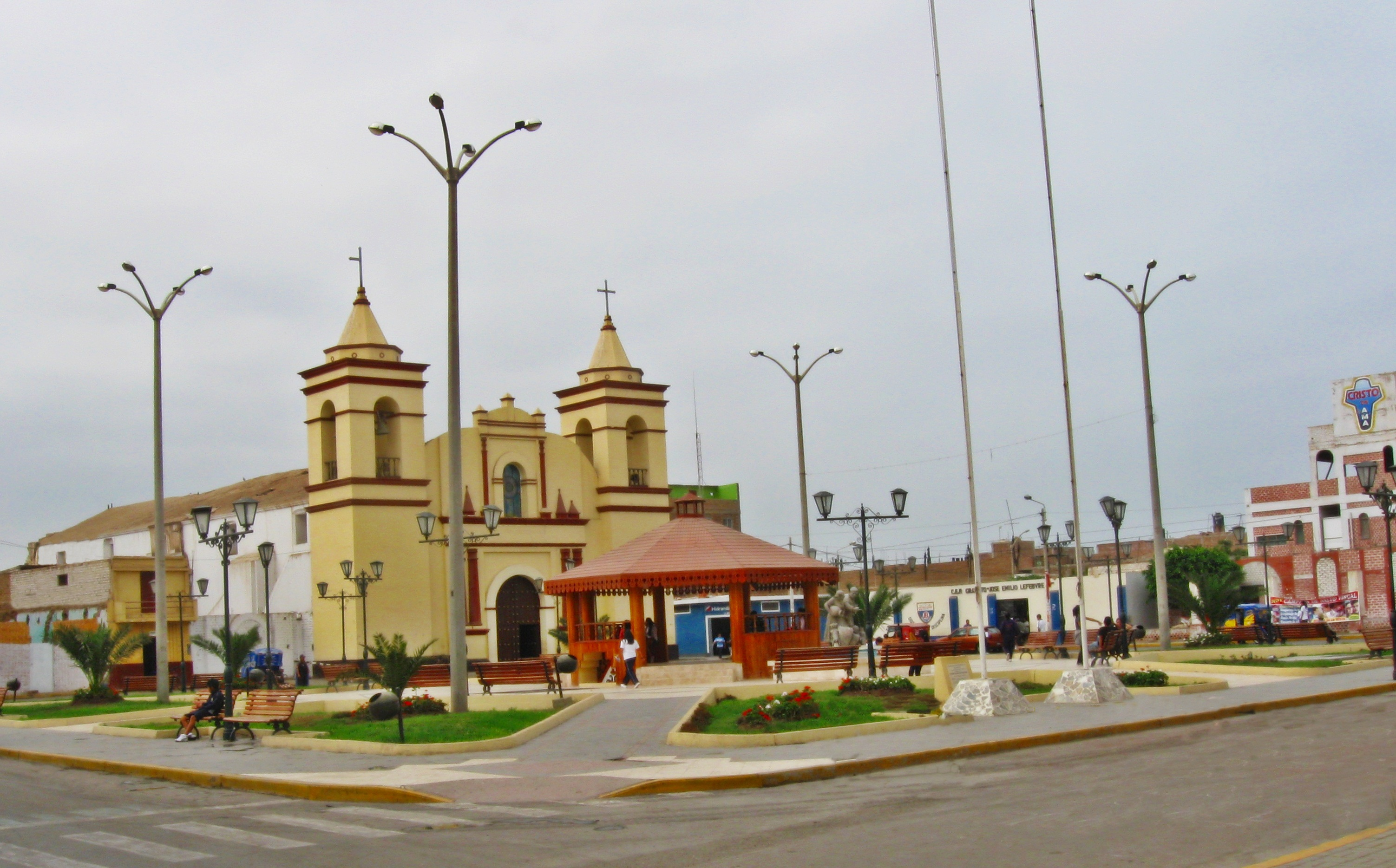
- Main plaza of Moche

- Location within Peru
- Coordinates: 08°10.0′14.22″S 79°0′33.95″W
- Country: Peru
- Region: La Libertad Region
- Province: Trujillo

Government
  - Mayor: Roger Emilio Quispe Rosales
- Elevation: 4 m (13 ft)

Population
  - Estimate (2015): 30,671
- Demonym(s): Mocheño(a); Mochica; Muchik
- Time zone: UTC-5 (PET)
- Website: www.munimoche.gob.pe/historia.php

Moche is a Peruvian city, the capital of Moche District in Trujillo Province of La Libertad Region in northern Peru. It is located in the Moche Valley and was the center of development of the ancient Moche or Mochica culture. Now it is a major tourist destination of the Moche Route tourist circuit and it is part of the integrated area of Trujillo city.

== Festivals ==
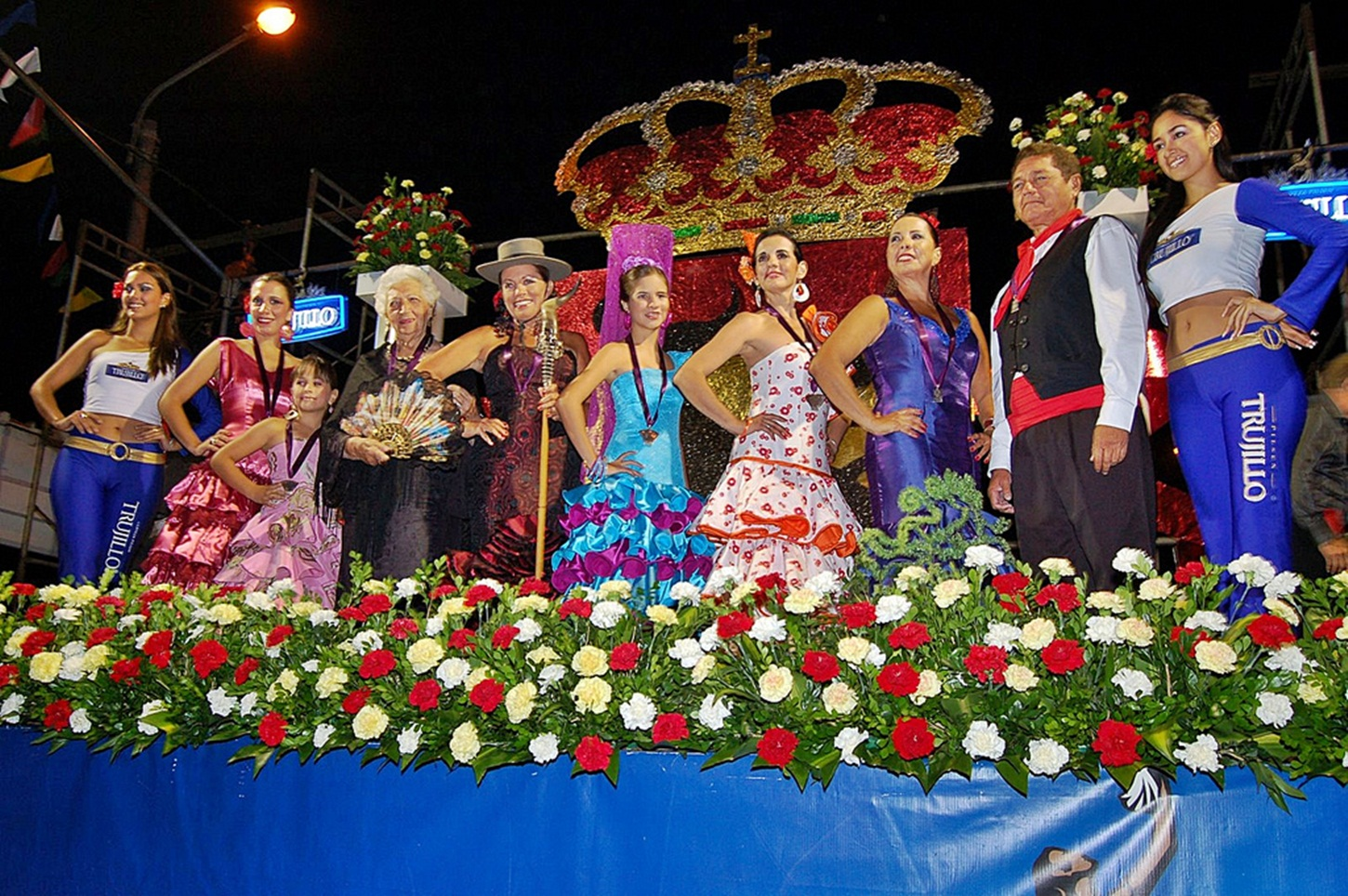
San Jose Festival

- San Jose Festival, in Las Delicias beach.
- Anniversary of Spanish foundation, celebrated in October of every year.

== Tourism ==
- Las Delicias beach
- Huacas del Sol y de la Luna

== Climate ==
Climate data for Moche, elevation 175 m (574 ft), (2002–2009)
Month	Jan	Feb	Mar	Apr	May	Jun	Jul	Aug	Sep	Oct	Nov	Dec	Year
Mean daily maximum °C (°F)	26.8 (80.2)	27.9 (82.2)	27.9 (82.2)	26.1 (79.0)	23.1 (73.6)	22.0 (71.6)	21.3 (70.3)	21.1 (70.0)	21.4 (70.5)	23.2 (73.8)	23.9 (75.0)	25.7 (78.3)	24.2 (75.6)
Mean daily minimum °C (°F)	19.4 (66.9)	20.6 (69.1)	20.1 (68.2)	18.1 (64.6)	16.1 (61.0)	15.5 (59.9)	15.2 (59.4)	14.8 (58.6)	14.9 (58.8)	15.1 (59.2)	15.5 (59.9)	17.7 (63.9)	16.9 (62.5)
Average precipitation mm (inches)	2.6 (0.10)	2.0 (0.08)	4.6 (0.18)	1.2 (0.05)	0.7 (0.03)	0.5 (0.02)	0.2 (0.01)	0.3 (0.01)	0.1 (0.00)	0.2 (0.01)	0.9 (0.04)	0.3 (0.01)	13.6 (0.54)
Average relative humidity (%)	73.7	73.4	74.8	75.1	77.8	79.7	78.4	79.0	78.0	76.5	75.8	74.4	76.4
Source: Sistema Nacional de Información Ambiental

== See also ==
- Moche culture
- Trujillo
- Valley of Moche
- Countryside of Moche
