= Moche Valley =

Region of Peru

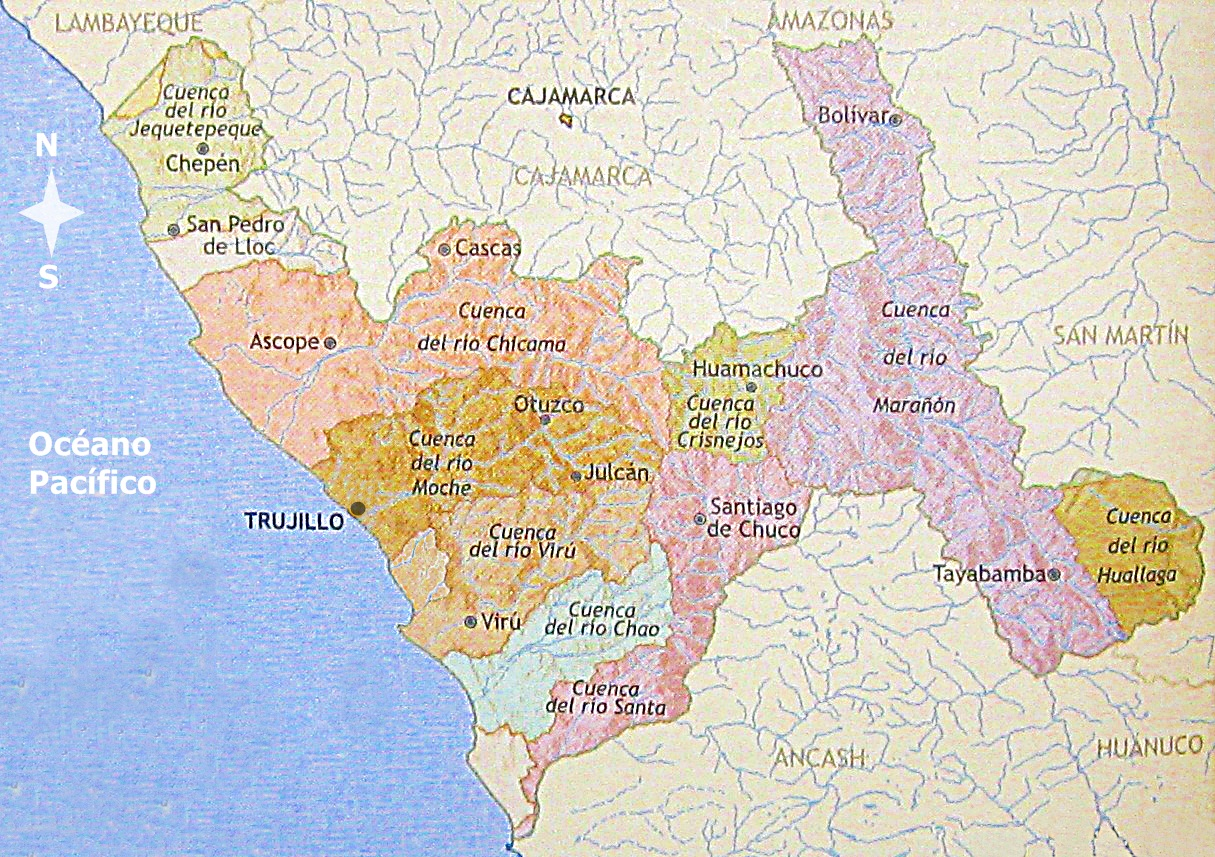
The valley of Moche is located at north of Viru Valley

The Valley of Moche, or Valley of Santa Catalina, is a large area of the La Libertad Region in northern Peru surrounding the Moche River. It has been farmed since the pre-Columbian era and currently contains rural and urban settlements. Trujillo is the most important city of the valley. It is now the location of several towns and agricultural areas where products such as sugarcane and asparagus are cultivated. The irrigation of its lands is part of the Chavimochic hydraulic engineering project.

== History ==
The pre-Columbian cultures Moche and Chimu emerged here. The Mochicas applied their knowledge of Hydraulic engineering and developed cultivation techniques in the valley and then on the arid coastline of northern Peru. Their culture flourished from 100 AD to 500 AD.

The Chimu developed later, rising from 900 AD to 1370 AD, when they were conquered by the Inca.

== Agriculture ==
It is a territory made fertile by the presence of the Moche river. One of the techniques applied in the valley is planting "wachaques" - wells dug to find water near the sea. "Totora" reeds (Scirpus californicus) were able to adapt to the brackish waters.

Major products cultivated in the valley are:

- Sugarcane
- Asparagus
- Pineapple
- Mochero chilli
- Avocado
- Blueberries
- Plum

Livestock include cattle, horses, alpaca, sheep and Llama.

== Notable places ==
Some interesting places in the valley are:

- Trujillo
- Moche
- Conache
- Countryside of Moche
- Huaca del Sol
- Víctor Larco city
- Huanchaco, etc.
- Otuzco
- Julcán

== See also ==
- Moche (culture)
- Moche city
- Las Delicias beach
- Huacas del Sol y de la Luna
- Chavimochic
