= Moche District =

Coordinates: 8°10′S 79°0′W

- District
- Interactive map of Moche District
- Country: Peru
- Region: La Libertad
- Province: Trujillo
- Capital: Moche

Government
  - Mayor: Roger Emilio Quispe Rosales

Area
  - Total: 25.25 km^{2} (9.75 sq mi)
- Elevation: 4 m (13 ft)

Population (2017)
  - Total: 37,436
  - Density: 1,483/km^{2} (3,840/sq mi)
- Time zone: UTC-5 (PET)
- UBIGEO: 130107

A family in Moche

Moche District is one of eleven districts of the province Trujillo in Peru.

== Climate ==
Climate data for Moche, elevation 175 m (574 ft), (2002–2009)
Month	Jan	Feb	Mar	Apr	May	Jun	Jul	Aug	Sep	Oct	Nov	Dec	Year
Mean daily maximum °C (°F)	26.8 (80.2)	27.9 (82.2)	27.9 (82.2)	26.1 (79.0)	23.1 (73.6)	22.0 (71.6)	21.3 (70.3)	21.1 (70.0)	21.4 (70.5)	23.2 (73.8)	23.9 (75.0)	25.7 (78.3)	24.2 (75.6)
Mean daily minimum °C (°F)	19.4 (66.9)	20.6 (69.1)	20.1 (68.2)	18.1 (64.6)	16.1 (61.0)	15.5 (59.9)	15.2 (59.4)	14.8 (58.6)	14.9 (58.8)	15.1 (59.2)	15.5 (59.9)	17.7 (63.9)	16.9 (62.5)
Average precipitation mm (inches)	2.6 (0.10)	2.0 (0.08)	4.6 (0.18)	1.2 (0.05)	0.7 (0.03)	0.5 (0.02)	0.2 (0.01)	0.3 (0.01)	0.1 (0.00)	0.2 (0.01)	0.9 (0.04)	0.3 (0.01)	13.6 (0.54)
Average relative humidity (%)	73.7	73.4	74.8	75.1	77.8	79.7	78.4	79.0	78.0	76.5	75.8	74.4	76.4
Source: Sistema Nacional de Información Ambiental
