= Huaca del Sol =

Archaeological site in Peru

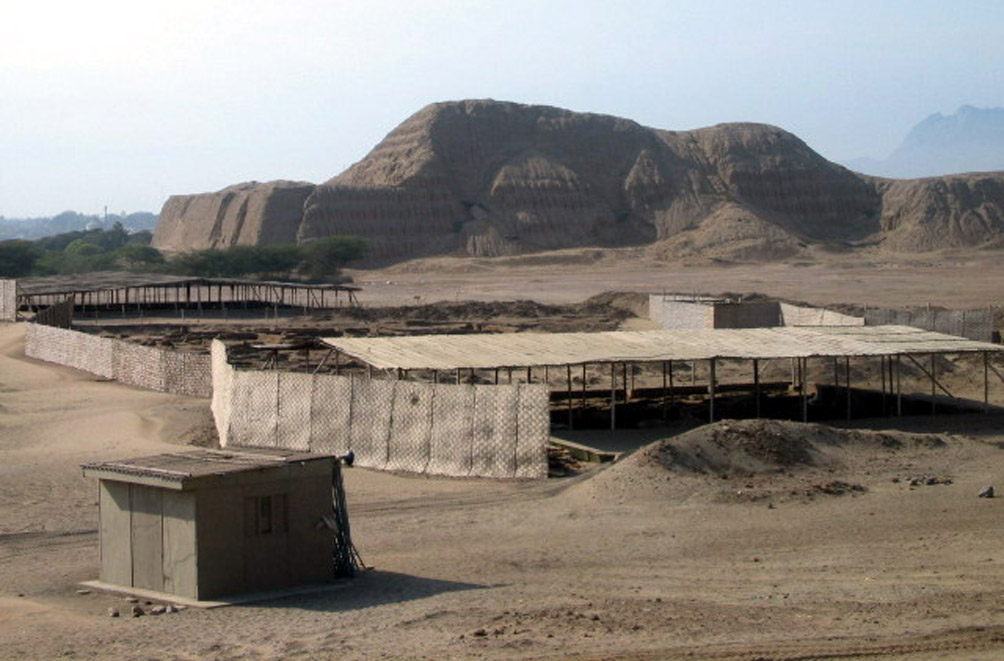
- Panoramic view of temple or Huaca of the Sun

- Location within Peru Location within South America
- Interactive map of Huaca del Sol
- 8°07′56″S 78°59′41″W
- Type: Settlement
- Periods: Early Intermediate
- Cultures: Moche
- Location: Moche District, Trujillo Province, La Libertad Region, Peru
- Region: Moche valley (North of Peru)
- Part of: Huacas of Moche

History
- Built by: Moche culture

Site notes
- Material: Adobe
- Elevation: 41 m (135 ft)
- Owner: Peruvian Government
- Public access: Yes

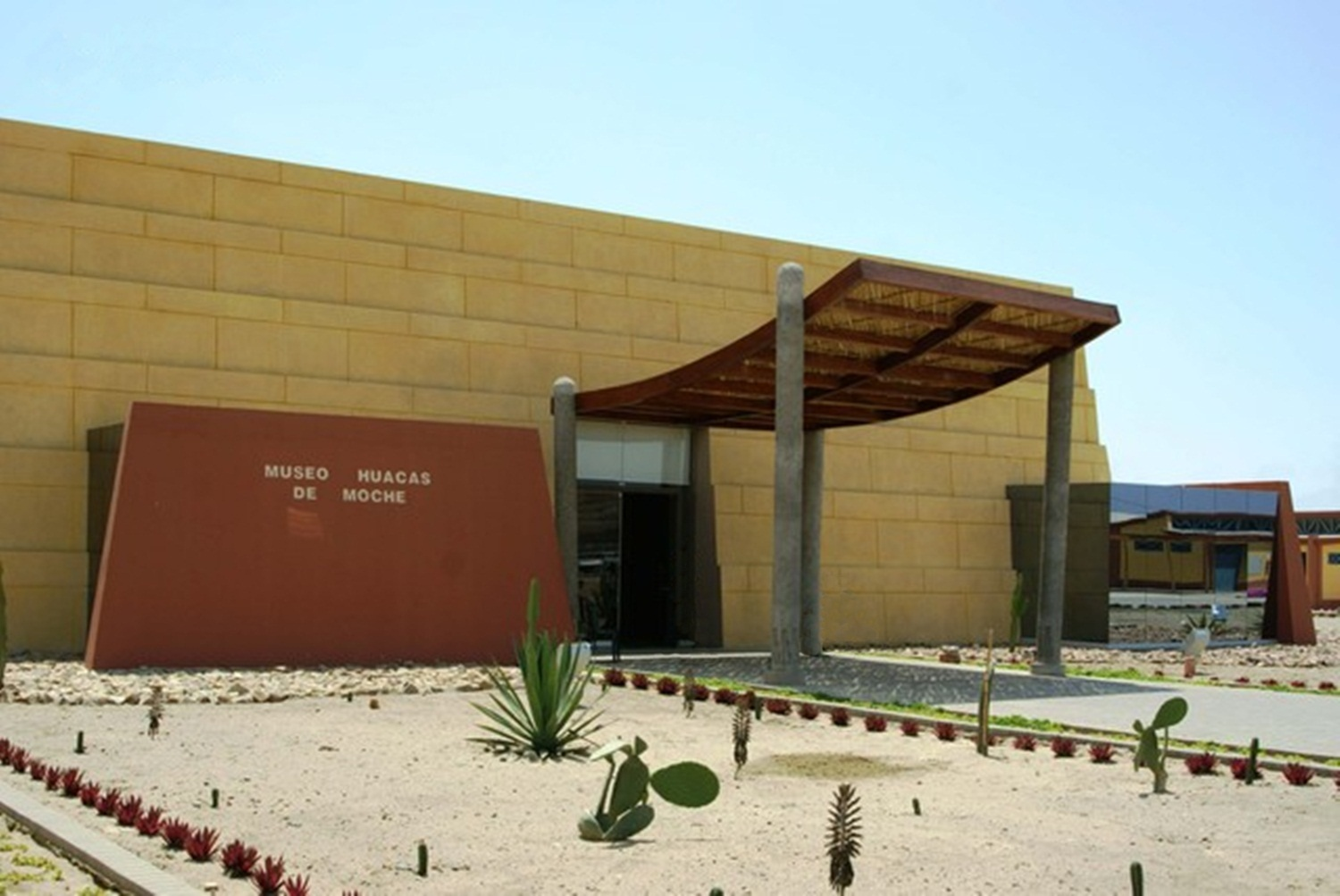
Museum Huacas of Moche

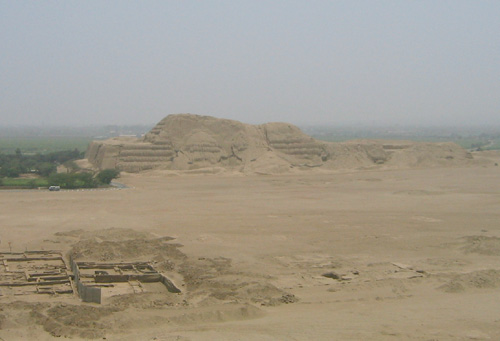
Huaca del Sol as seen from the southeast, with the Moche River delta beyond and city ruins in the foreground.

The Huaca del Sol is an adobe brick pyramid built by the Moche civilization (100 AD to 800 AD) on the northern coast of what is now Peru. The pyramid is one of several ruins found near the volcanic peak of Cerro Blanco, in the coastal desert near Trujillo at the Moche Valley. The other major ruin at the site is the nearby Huaca de la Luna, a better-preserved but smaller temple.

By 450 AD, eight different stages of construction had been completed on the Huaca del Sol. The technique was additive; new layers of brick were laid directly on top of the old, hence large quantities of bricks were required for the construction. Archeologists have estimated that the Huaca del Sol was composed of over 130 million adobe bricks and was the largest pre-Columbian adobe structure built in the Americas. The number of different makers' marks on the bricks suggests that over a hundred different communities contributed bricks to the construction of the Huacas.

The Huaca del Sol was composed of four main levels. The structure was expanded and rebuilt by different rulers over the course of time. It is believed to have originally been about 50 meters in height and 340 m by 160 m at the base. Located at the center of the Moche capital city, the temple appears to have been used for ritual, ceremonial activities and as a royal residence and burial chambers. Archaeological evidence attests to these functions.

During the Spanish occupation of Peru in the early 17th century, colonists redirected the waters of the Moche River to run past the base of the Huaca del Sol in order to facilitate the looting of gold artifacts from the temple. The operation of the hydraulic mine greatly damaged the Huaca del Sol. In total, approximately two-thirds of the structure has been lost to erosion and such looting. The remaining structure stands at a height of 41 meters (135 feet).

Looting and erosion due to El Niño continue to be major concerns to this day.

== See also ==
- Huaca de la Luna
- History of Peru
- Pre-Inca cultures
- List of tallest structures built before the 20th century

== Sources ==
1. Art of the Andes, from Chavin to Inca. Rebecca Stone-Miller, Thames and Hudson, 1995.
2. The Incas and Their Ancestors: the archaeology of Peru. Michael E. Moseley, Thames and Hudson, 1992.
