= Trujillo metropolitan area (Peru) =

Place on the north coast of Peru

Trujillo Metropolitan Area
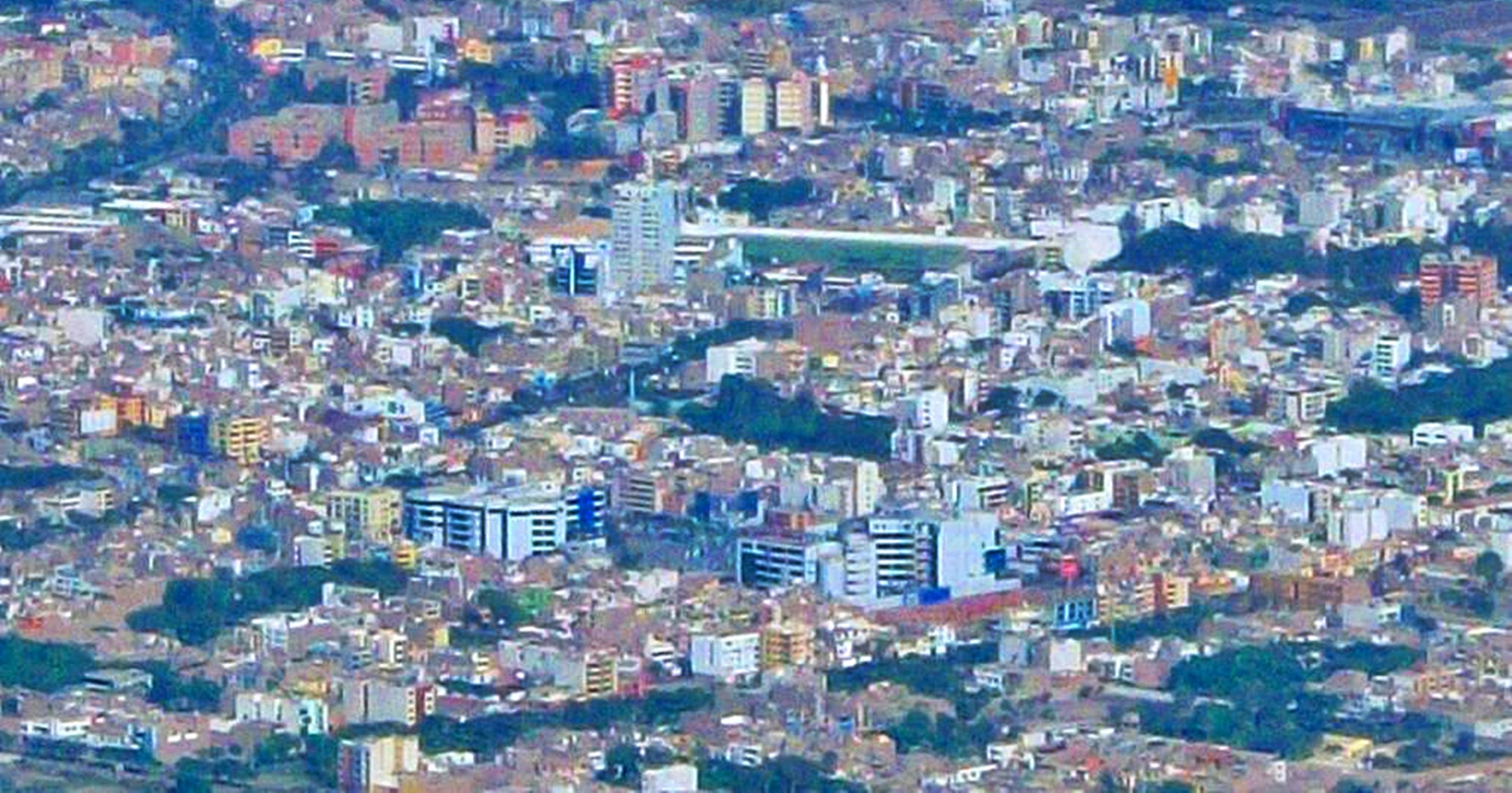
- Trujillo City
- Interactive map of Trujillo Metropolitan Area
- Coordinates: 8°6′43.2″S 79°1′43.68″W
- Country: Peru
- Region: La Libertad
- Province: Trujillo Province
- Largest city: Trujillo City
- District(s): 1.Trujillo; 2.Víctor Larco; 3.Moche; 4.Huanchaco; 5.La Esperanza; 6.El Porvenir; 7.Florencia de Mora; 8.Laredo; 9.Salaverry
- Other Cities: Víctor Larco; Moche City; Huanchaco; Salaverry; Laredo
- Established: 1534

Government
  - Mayor–council government: Cesar Acuña Peralta (Alliance for Progress)

Area
  - Total: 410 sq mi (1,100 km^{2})

Population (2017 Census)
  - Total: 962,369
  - Density: 2,169/sq mi (837/km^{2})
- Demonym: Trujillano(a) (in Spanish)
- Time zone: UTC-5 (PET)
- Area code: 044
- Website: http://www.munitrujillo.gob.pe/
- Highest elevation 3937 ft/1,200 m (Campana Mountain, in Huanchaco District). Lowest elevation 0 ft/0 m (sea level) at the Pacific Ocean, Buenos Aires beach, and Moche River estuary waterways.

The Trujillo Metropolitan Area is the name used to refer to the metropolitan area whose core is the city of Trujillo, capital La Libertad Region, this metropolitan area located on the north coast of Peru, extends over an area of approximately 110,000 hectares and comprises nine of the eleven districts that make up the province of Trujillo. According to population statistics of INEI, It is the third most populous metropolitan area of Peru.

== History ==
Trujillo, years ago separated from the other localities by the wall Trujillo, is now fully expanded to the four cardinal points of the ancient wall fragments are only historically preserved. However, Trujillo has been influential to nearby cities for decades, having great interaction with them. The urban integration of some of these towns to the metropolis has led its growth. An aerial photograph from the satellite shows a single urban area where it is difficult to distinguish the boundaries of Trujillo and its conurbation metropolitan districts, virtually separated only administratively.

== Planning ==
The Planning of Peruvian metropolitan areas are made, by the government of municipalities of each city, with authority granted by Organic Law of Municipalities, and they have the support of an expert office for urban planning with specific functions. Wherefore officially valid data about districts conformation for metropolitan areas in Peru are those issued by official documents issued and validated by the respective municipal governments of each city under the law that local governments are autonomous political, economic and administrative matters within its jurisdiction and its powers according to the law of municipalities, an attribution of these is to approve the urban development plan.

== Extent and structure ==
The metropolitan area of Trujillo occupies a territory whose length is approximately 110,000 hectares, and comprises the lower Moche Valley or Valle de Santa Catalina and Intervalles to Chicama valley to the north and the Viru Valley southward with its central theme the irrigation project Chavimochic.

=== Population ===
According to PLANDET, agency of the Municipality of the city, Metropolitan Trujillo consists of the so-called Trujillo Urban Continuum formed by the districts of Trujillo, El Porvenir, Florencia de Mora, La Esperenza and Victor Larco Herrera, and the sector El Milagro of Huanchaco District, as well as all urban and rural settlements in the valley of Santa Catalina, the Moche river basin, which correspond to the districts of Huanchaco, Laredo, Moche and Salaverry, organized as a unit of planning.

- In the table is shown some data of the districts of Trujillo Metropolitan:

Ubigeo	District	Homes	Households	Population 2017
130101	Trujillo	87,963	82,236	314,939
130102	El Porvenir	57,878	50,805	190,461
130103	Florencia De Mora	7,777	8,635	37,262
130104	Huanchaco	20,206	16,534	68,409
130105	La Esperanza	49,773	47,896	189,206
130106	Laredo	12,204	9,933	37,206
130107	Moche	9,776	8,965	37,436
130109	Salaverry	5,599	5,244	18,944
130111	Víctor Larco Herrera	19,543	18,461	68,506
	TOTAL	270,719	248,709	962,369
Source: National Census 2017

- Graphics of evolution of the population by INEI

Sources: Population 2007

=== Population by districts ===
In the following table of population distribution can be seen the demographic evolution of Trujillo metropolitan by districts.

Demographic evolution of the Metropolis Trujillo since 1940
Metropolitan districts of Trujillo	Population by year						
Metropolitan districts of Trujillo	1940	1961	1972	1981	1993	2007	Estimated; 2015
1. Trujillo	45928	119221	132847	202469	247028	294899	318.914
2. La Esperanza	*	*	42113	62550	105361	151845	182.494
3. El Porvenir	*	*	58331	77198	80698	140507	186.127
4. Victor Larco Herrera	*	4565	14140	21001	42169	55781	64.024
5. Huanchaco	780	1087	4497	7407	19935	44806	68.104
6. Florencia de Mora	*	*	*	*	35806	40014	41.914
7. Laredo	*	*	13269	15215	28019	32825	35.289
8. Moche	3773	5903	9000	11862	22020	29727	34.503
9. Salaverry	3403	4605	5284	5635	8278	13892	18.129
Trujillo metropolitan	53884	135381	279481	403337	589314	804296	909.498
Census made by the INEI; Estimated Population-INEI.* The asterisk sign indicates in that year the district had not been created yet.

== See also ==
- List of metropolitan areas of Peru
- Trujillo
- La Libertad Region
- Peru
