= Shirán =

- Town
- Location within Peru
- Coordinates: 8°0′35.95″S 78°45′5.28″W
- Country: Peru
- Region: La Libertad
- Province: Trujillo
- District: Poroto
- Time zone: UTC-5 (PET)

Shirán is a town in Northern Peru, located in the district of Poroto in Trujillo Province of the region La Libertad. This town is located some 40 km east of Trujillo city in the Valley of Moche.

== Nearby cities ==
- Trujillo, Peru
- Víctor Larco Herrera
- Otuzco

== See also ==
- La Libertad Region
- Simbal
- Moche River
