= Florencia de Mora, Trujillo =

Florencia de Mora
- Town
- Location within Peru
- Coordinates: 8°4′52.53″S 79°1′24.16″W
- Country: Peru
- Region: La Libertad
- Province: Trujillo
- District: Florencia de Mora
- Time zone: UTC-5 (PET)

Florencia de Mora is a city in northern Peru, capital of the district Florencia de Mora in Trujillo Province of the region La Libertad. This city is located some 3 km north of the Historic Centre of Trujillo city.

== Nearby cities ==
- Trujillo, Peru
- La Esperanza

== See also ==
- La Libertad Region
- Simbal
- Moche River
