= El Porvenir, Peru =

El Porvenir
- Town
- Location within Peru
- Coordinates: 8°03′59″S 79°00′17″W
- Country: Peru
- Region: La Libertad
- Province: Trujillo
- District: El Porvenir

Government
  - Mayor: Angel Rodriguez Armas (2019-2022)
- Time zone: UTC-5 (PET)

El Porvenir is a city in Northern Peru, capital of the district El Porvenir in Trujillo Province of the region La Libertad. This city is located some 4 km north of the Historic Centre of Trujillo city.

== Festivals ==
- International Calzaferia El Porvenir is a fair of footwear held in El Porvenir city; the 10th edition took place in 2012.

== Nearby cities ==
- Trujillo, Peru
- Víctor Larco Herrera

== Climate ==
Climate data for Pelejo, El Porvenir, elevation 141 m (463 ft), (1991–2020)
Month	Jan	Feb	Mar	Apr	May	Jun	Jul	Aug	Sep	Oct	Nov	Dec	Year
Mean daily maximum °C (°F)	31.4 (88.5)	31.2 (88.2)	31.2 (88.2)	31.6 (88.9)	31.6 (88.9)	31.4 (88.5)	31.7 (89.1)	33.0 (91.4)	33.6 (92.5)	32.4 (90.3)	31.9 (89.4)	31.5 (88.7)	31.9 (89.4)
Mean daily minimum °C (°F)	22.3 (72.1)	22.0 (71.6)	22.1 (71.8)	22.2 (72.0)	21.9 (71.4)	21.0 (69.8)	20.4 (68.7)	20.5 (68.9)	21.3 (70.3)	22.0 (71.6)	22.3 (72.1)	22.2 (72.0)	21.7 (71.0)
Average precipitation mm (inches)	177.4 (6.98)	201.6 (7.94)	232.0 (9.13)	211.2 (8.31)	156.2 (6.15)	92.8 (3.65)	91.0 (3.58)	83.4 (3.28)	132.3 (5.21)	179.4 (7.06)	211.9 (8.34)	218.5 (8.60)	1,987.7 (78.23)
Source: National Meteorology and Hydrology Service of Peru

== See also ==
- La Libertad Region
- Simbal
- Moche River
