= Carnival of Conache =

Festival in Peru

- Genre: Costumbrist Festival
- Begins: February 2
- Frequency: annual
- Location: Conache (Trujillo city)
- Years active: 1977 - present
- Most recent: 16° edition (2012)
- Attendance: 20.000
- Website: http://www.carnavaldeconache.com/

Carnival of Conache (spanish:Carnaval de Conache), is a festival held each year in the peruvian town of Conache, located nearby Trujillo city at southeast. It consists of several activities including the crowning of the queen, and a big celebration with the ancient drink called Chicha.

== Description ==
The carnival is a costumbrist event and it has been held since the 16 years old, villagers performed a popular carnival festival in Conache, it consists of several events and activities including the crowning of the queen, the carnival party among others.

== Events ==
The principal events are:

- Sports for the carnaval it takes place a marathon.
- Typical foods, one of the most requested is fried cuy.
- Presentation of the queen
- Paso horses
- Marinera dance
- Palo Cilulo, the people dance around a tree decorated with presents and other carnival things, this tree is also called "unsha", "Yunza", "Corta monte", or "Umisha", and while the people dance around someone turns to cut the tree little by little with an Axe for a little while then more people makes the same until it falls down. When this happens people come to the tree to take the presents while people plays with water and some colored creams for their faces. Generally the dances in the palo cilulo are entertained by bands of musicians with huayno music.
- Carnaval Party, is celebrated in the central day.
Foods in Conache
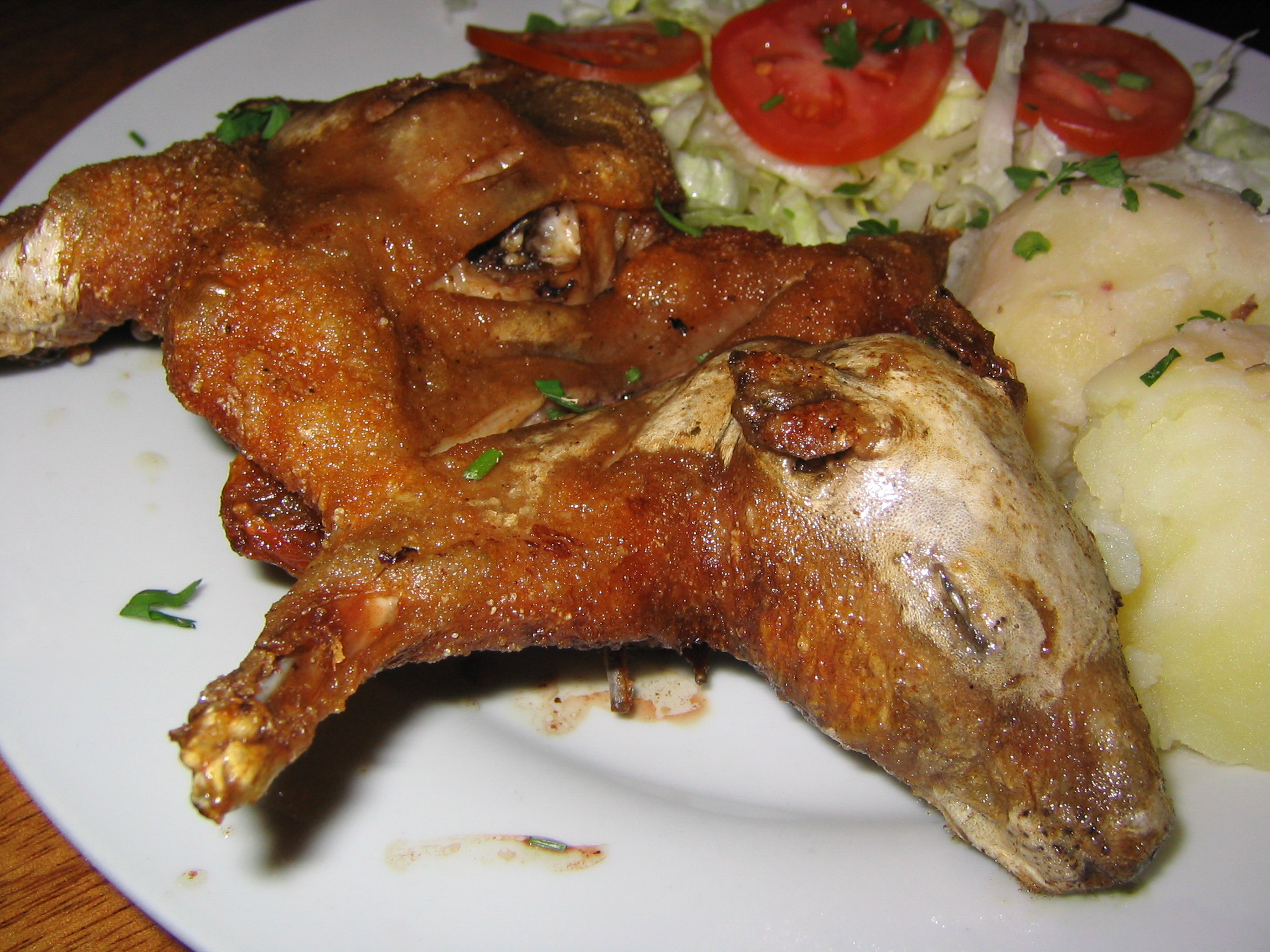
Fried cuy is one of the most requested foods in the Carnival of Conache

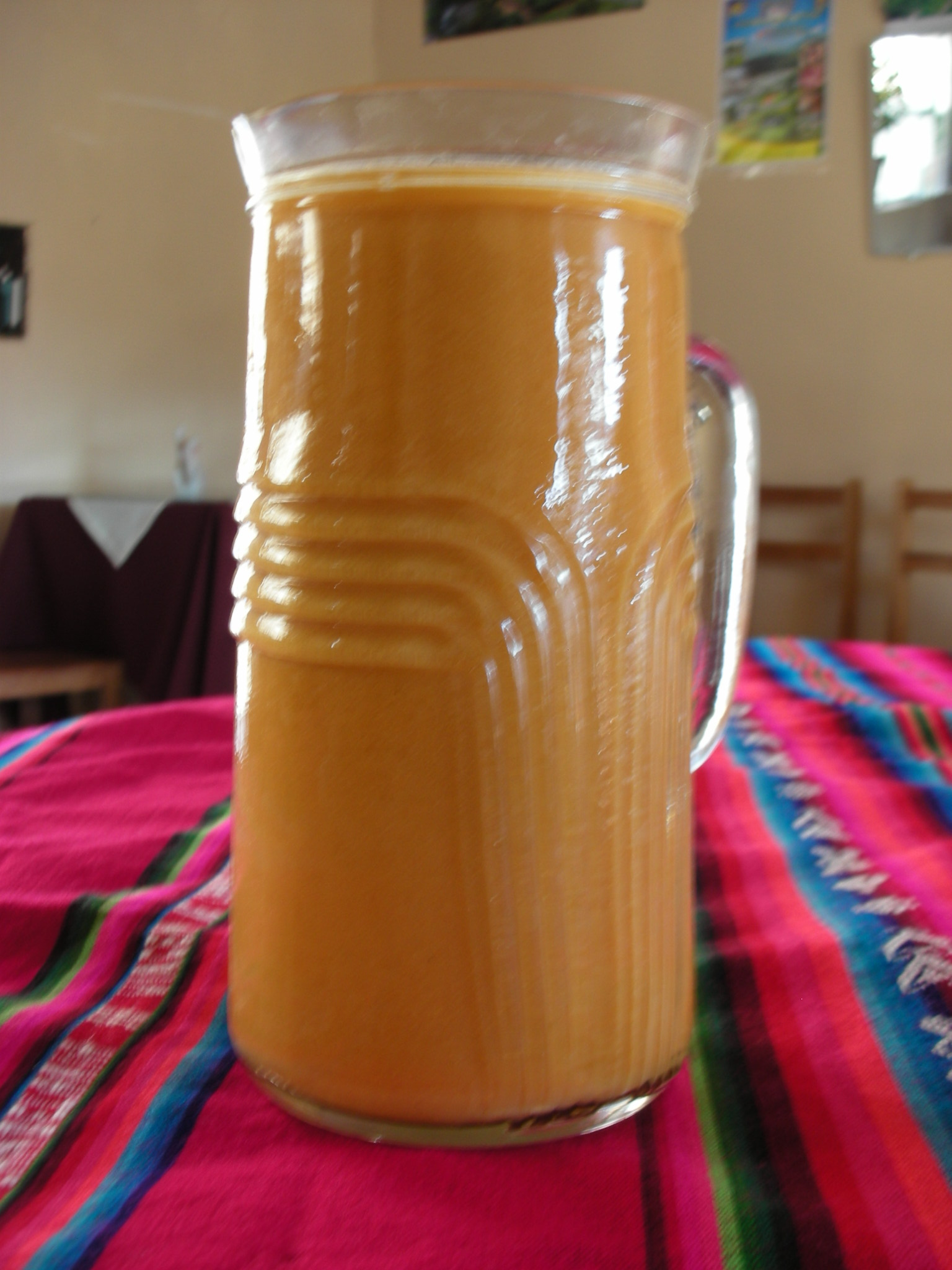
Chicha is the most requested drink in this carnival

== See also ==
- Lake Conache
- Carnival of Huanchaco
- Trujillo Spring Festival
- San Jose Festival
- Trujillo Book Festival
- Trujillo
- Santiago de Huamán
- Victor Larco Herrera District
- Laredo District
