= El Milagro, Peru =

El Milagro
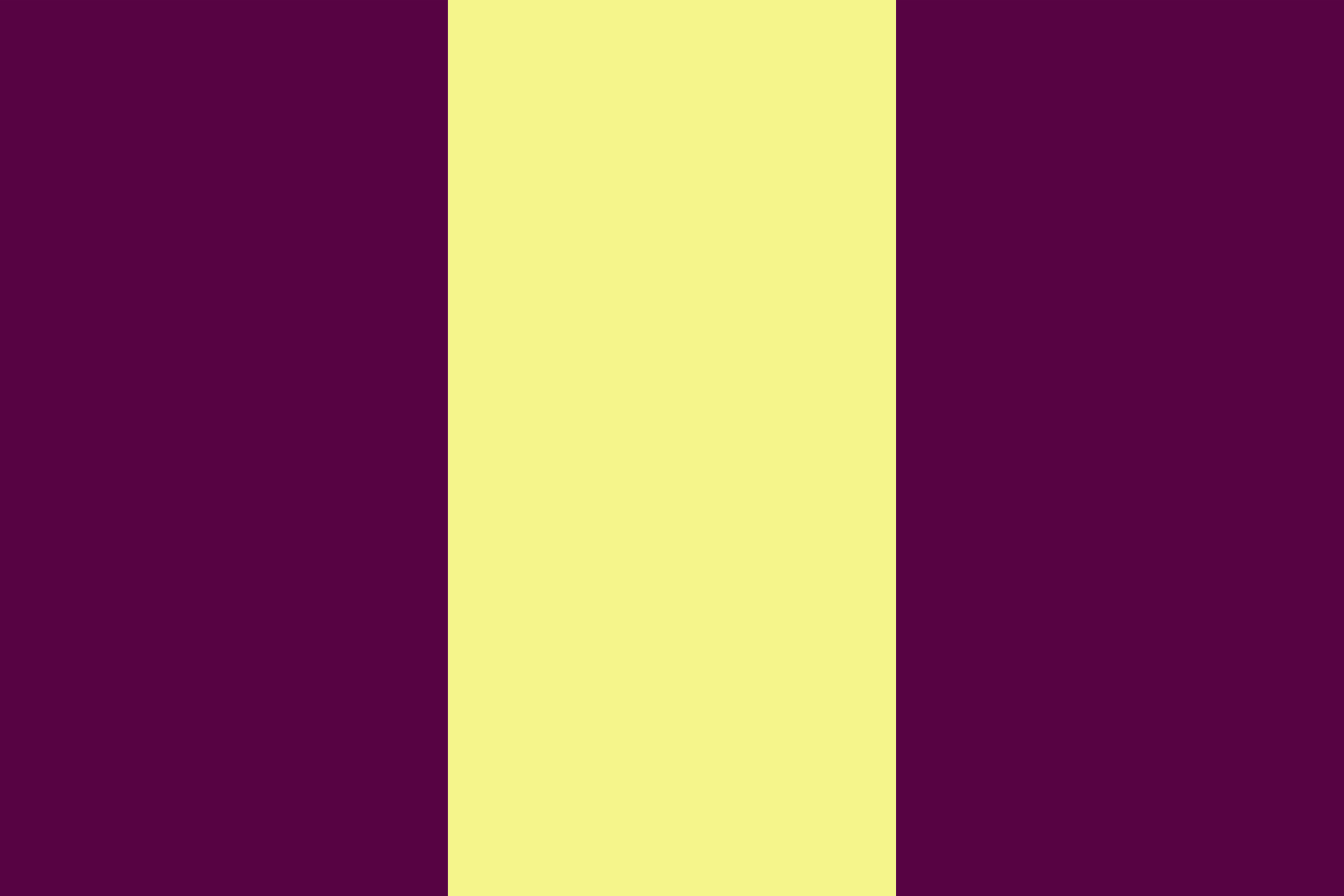
- Flag

- Location within Peru
- Coordinates: 8°1′42.09″S 79°4′2″W
- Country: Peru
- Region: La Libertad Region
- Province: Trujillo
- District: Huanchaco

Government
  - Mayor: Fernando Bazan Pinillos

Population (2007)
  - Urban: 24,625
- Time zone: UTC-5 (PET)
- Website: Municipality of Huanchaco

El Milagro is a populated place in the Huanchaco district in the La Libertad Region, Peru. It is part of the urban area of Trujillo city. In 2011, local residents had the idea of upgrading the area as a district. Fishing plays a large role in its economy.

== Population ==
According to the 2007 census, the town of El Milagro had an estimated population of 24,625 inhabitants, of whom 12,828 were men and 11,797 were women. The population of El Milagro is relatively young, with 62.86% being under 29 years old.

== See also ==
- Trujillo
- Historic Centre of Trujillo
- Chan Chan
- Puerto Chicama
- Chimu
- Pacasmayo beach
- Marcahuamachuco
- Wiracochapampa
- Moche
- Víctor Larco Herrera District
- Vista Alegre
- Las Delicias beach
- La Libertad Region
- Trujillo Province, Peru
- Virú culture
- Lake Conache
- Marinera Festival
- Trujillo Spring Festival
- Wetlands of Huanchaco
- Salaverry
- Buenos Aires
- San Jose Festival
- Puerto Morín
