= SKIP Peru =

British-based Peruvian nonprofit organization

SKIP (Supporting Kids in Peru) was a UK-founded NGO that was active from 2003 to 2019. The organization worked in the city of Trujillo which is located on the north coast of Peru. Most of the work that the organization carried out was done in El Porvenir, an impoverished district of Trujillo. SKIP stated that their vision is “A Peru where each child realizes his/her full potential through quality education, economically stable families and healthy home environments.” The organization promoted quality education and fostered the capacity of children and families to be the principal agents of change in their own lives. The organization worked with families through programs focusing on the educational, economic, emotional and social development of each child and the parents. In 2016 the annual income for SKIP was 118,266 British pounds.

SKIP closed in 2019. From their website:

A Message From Supporting Kids in Peru

Dear friends,

After 15 years of providing services in the community of El Porvenir, SKIP has decided to close its doors. This January as a result of a joint decision by the Director and Board of Directors, SKIP closed its programmes with immediate effect. This decision was not taken lightly and the entire SKIP team and staff are saddened by the news.

There are a few reasons which have led to this outcome which combine security and financial issues as well as major staff changes which the parents found difficult to accept.

We would like to take this opportunity to thank everyone who has been involved in SKIP over the last 15 years. Please do not doubt the impact that we had in the community and the positive contribution we made to the SKIP families and children. Your efforts will not be forgotten and we hope that the families of SKIP will find the support we provided from different organisations in the area.

Everyone should be proud of the bonds made and lives changed over our 15 year history.

Un abrazo,

SKIP

== SKIP’s Methodology ==
SKIP was made up of a team of volunteers from all over the world who worked in departments focusing on education and on family welfare. SKIP believed in the global community's responsibility to promote universal quality education and eradicate poverty. SKIP's international volunteer program forged links between El Porvenir and other countries, providing opportunities for international volunteers to see and understand the effects of poverty, while at the same time opening 'windows to the world' for Peruvians and fostering a sense of community and responsibility among all.

== Education Program ==
Children of low income families are a particularly vulnerable population in Peru. 27% of all school age children in Peru are not enrolled in school. Additionally, Peru spends only 3.3% of its GDP on education compared to the Latin American average of 4.5%. SKIP's education program aimed to fill the gaps that exist in the public education system for students beginning at an early age. The World Bank recognizes that “One of the principal challenges in reducing poverty and accelerating development in Peru is improving the quality of education.” SKIP understood the complex factors and consequences of poverty, and therefore developed a range of programs employing a holistic approach. These focus on four pillars of family development: education, economic stability, emotional well-being, and healthy and safe home environments. SKIP also worked towards the achievement of the 2nd and 3rd millennium goals proposed by the UN, that by 2015, children everywhere would be able to complete a full course of primary schooling, and to eliminate gender disparity in primary and secondary education in all levels of education no later than 2015. SKIP placed a high importance on participation of families and children in their programs and views high rates of participation as key to their holistic approach. Their rates of attendance increased from around 15 percent in 2008 to 83 percent in 2011. SKIP's education program focused on primary and secondary students and provides academic support in the form of Maths, Communication and English classes as well as workshops in other areas such as art and sport. There was about 300 students between the ages of four and eighteen enrolled in SKIP's education program. SKIP stated that their approach involved a kinesthetic and dynamic teaching style to help relate concepts to their everyday lives, as well as a social and emotional learning program to help children have the skills and confidence to work through difficulties.

== Family Welfare Programs ==
SKIP's focus on education was fostered by the holistic work within the welfare programs, which included the whole family unit. The parents are the ones ultimately responsible for the upbringing of the children, and so SKIP recognized the importance of working with them in the areas of economic development, social work, and psychology. “Poverty and associated health, nutrition, and social factors prevent at least 200 million children in developing countries from attaining their developmental potential." SKIP's family welfare programs had the overarching goal of avoiding these risk factors that are directly related to poverty. The economic development team worked with families in the form of microcredit loans and production workshops that served as a form of secondary income for the families. In 2011, the microcredit program saw a repayment rate of 99%. SKIP social workers provided workshops aimed at improving the social abilities of the parents and the psychology departments work with both children and parents in order to improve the families' emotional well-being.
