= Conache =

- Location in Peru
- Coordinates: 8°7′20.88″S 78°57′2.49″W
- Country: Peru
- Region: La Libertad
- Province: Trujillo
- District: Laredo
- Founded: mochica

Government
  - Type: Mayor–council government
  - Mayor: Miguel Orlando Chavez Castro
- Elevation: 89 m (292 ft)
- Time zone: UTC-5 (PET)
- Area code: 044
- Demonym: (Spanish: laredino/a)
- Website: Municipality of Laredo

Conache is a peruvian town located in Laredo District about 14 km from Trujillo city in La Libertad Region. This is set in an ancient place, which belonged to the mochica culture in the pre-Inca era. This town has sandy lands, and is washed by the Moche River, allowing currently an agricultural and livestock acceptable level. It also has remains of the ancient agriculture, and paved channels, in the area called "The Devil's pocket."

== History ==
The town is located in the valley of the river Moche with high agricultural production. In old times its huachaques (Moche irrigations) were well used by the Indians for livestock and for hydrobiological elements. In colonial times, the first conquerors and Hispanic settlers made of Conache an agricultural and food production. It was a production place for the emerging markets of Trujillo. Currently Conache belongs to Laredo district, and is located 7 km from the city of Laredo.

== Economy ==
Conache today is a farming village, where people cultivates corn, beans, sugar cane, vegetables and the people also dedicates to livestock, forage cultivation and animal husbandry majors and minors.

== Festivals ==
- Carnival of Conache, is a festival held each year in the Peruvian town of Conache, located near Trujillo city to the southeast. It consists of several activities including the crowning of the queen, and a big celebration with the ancient drink called Chicha.

== Tourism ==
- Lake Conache previously used to be seasonal, forming periodically during the rainy season, and dried up some months later. However, after the completion of the second phase of the special project of irrigation Chavimochic, with the continuous flood irrigation of the crops in the Pampas de San Juan, the water table increased gradually by the leaks, and the lake came to have permanent water and is growing in volume.
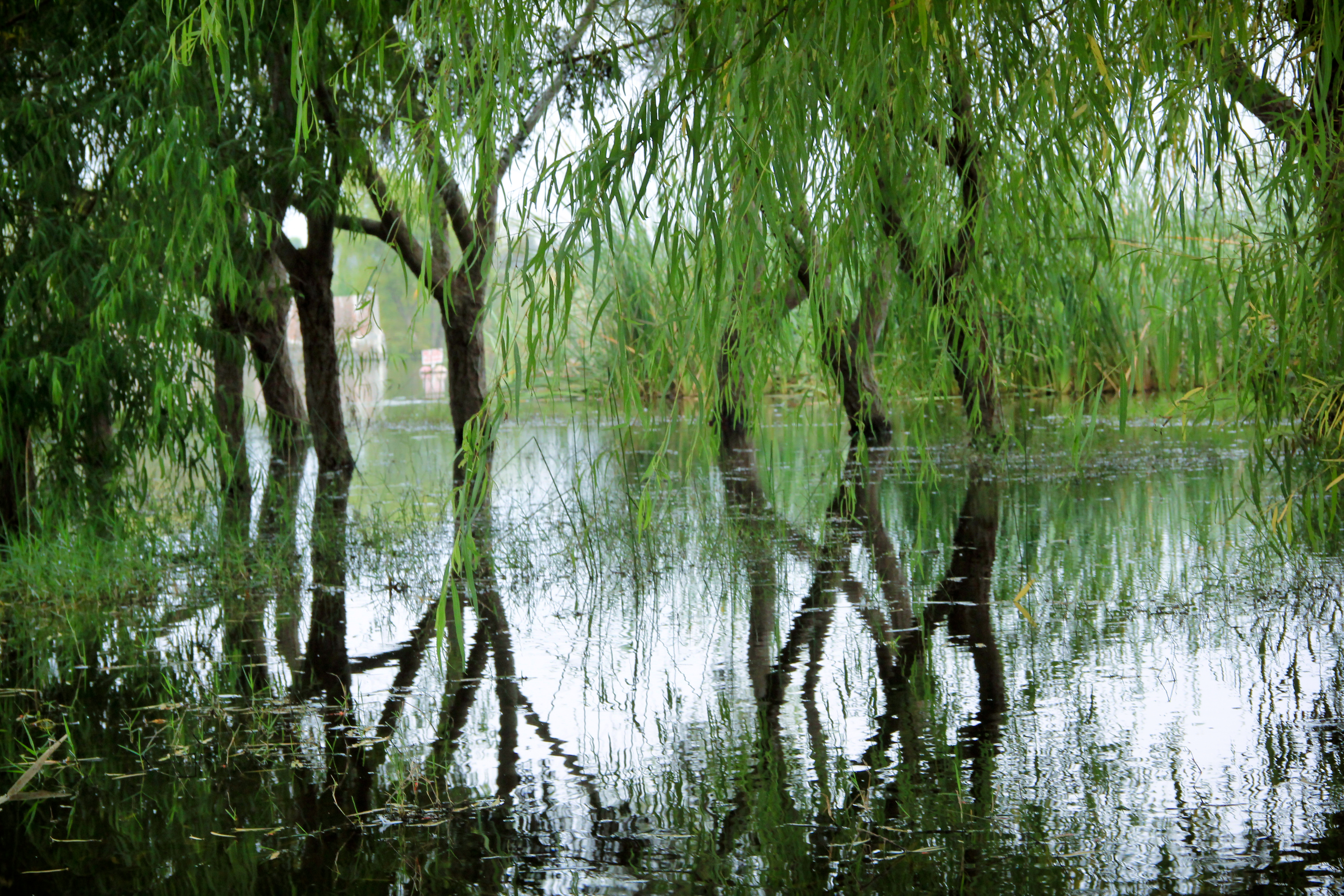
Lake Conache

== See also ==
- Trujillo
- Trujillo Province
- La Libertad Region
- Laredo District
- Lake Conache
- Carnival of Conache
