= Laredo, Trujillo =

Laredo, Peru
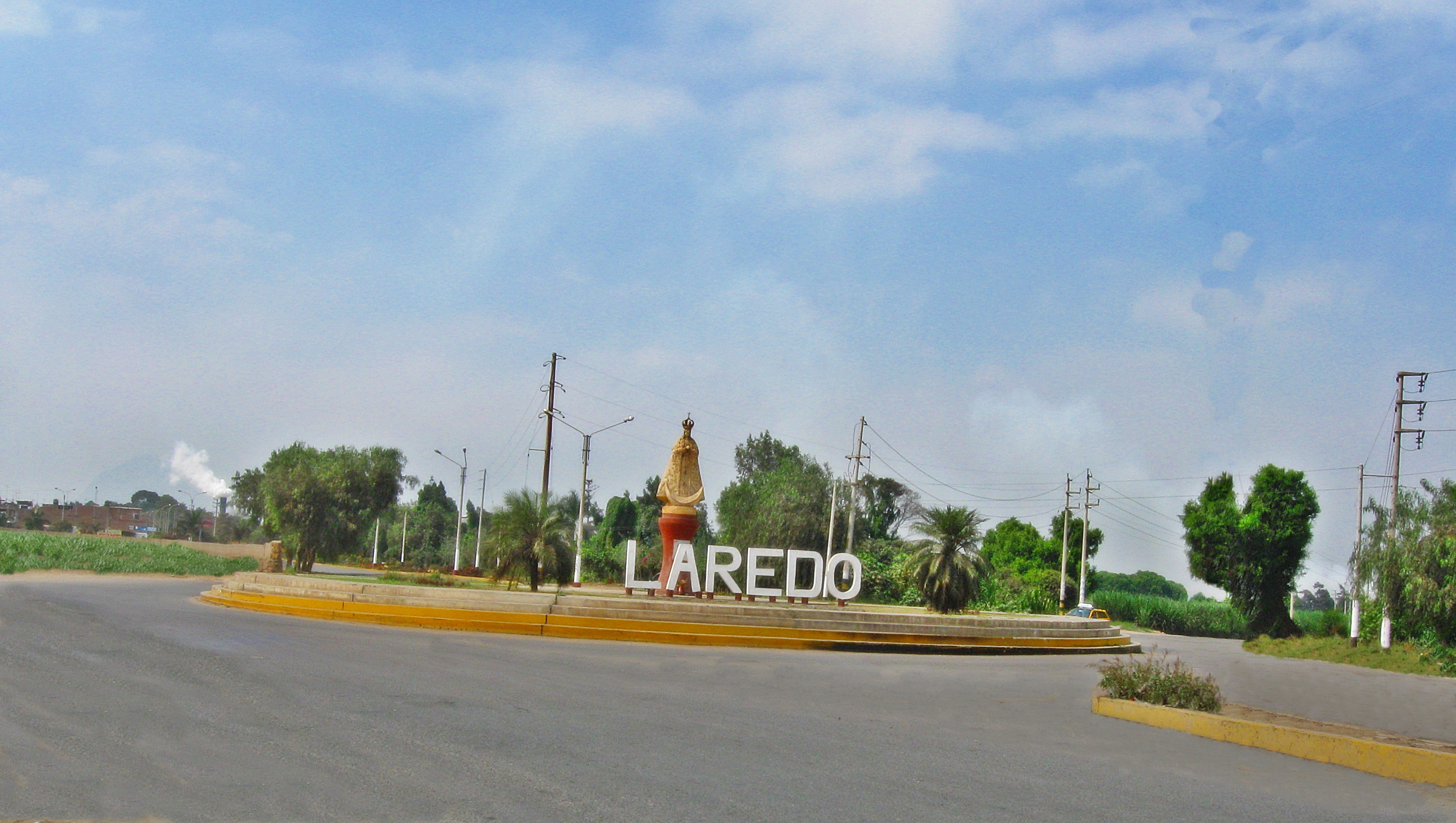
- Traffic circle in the highway at the entrance of the city

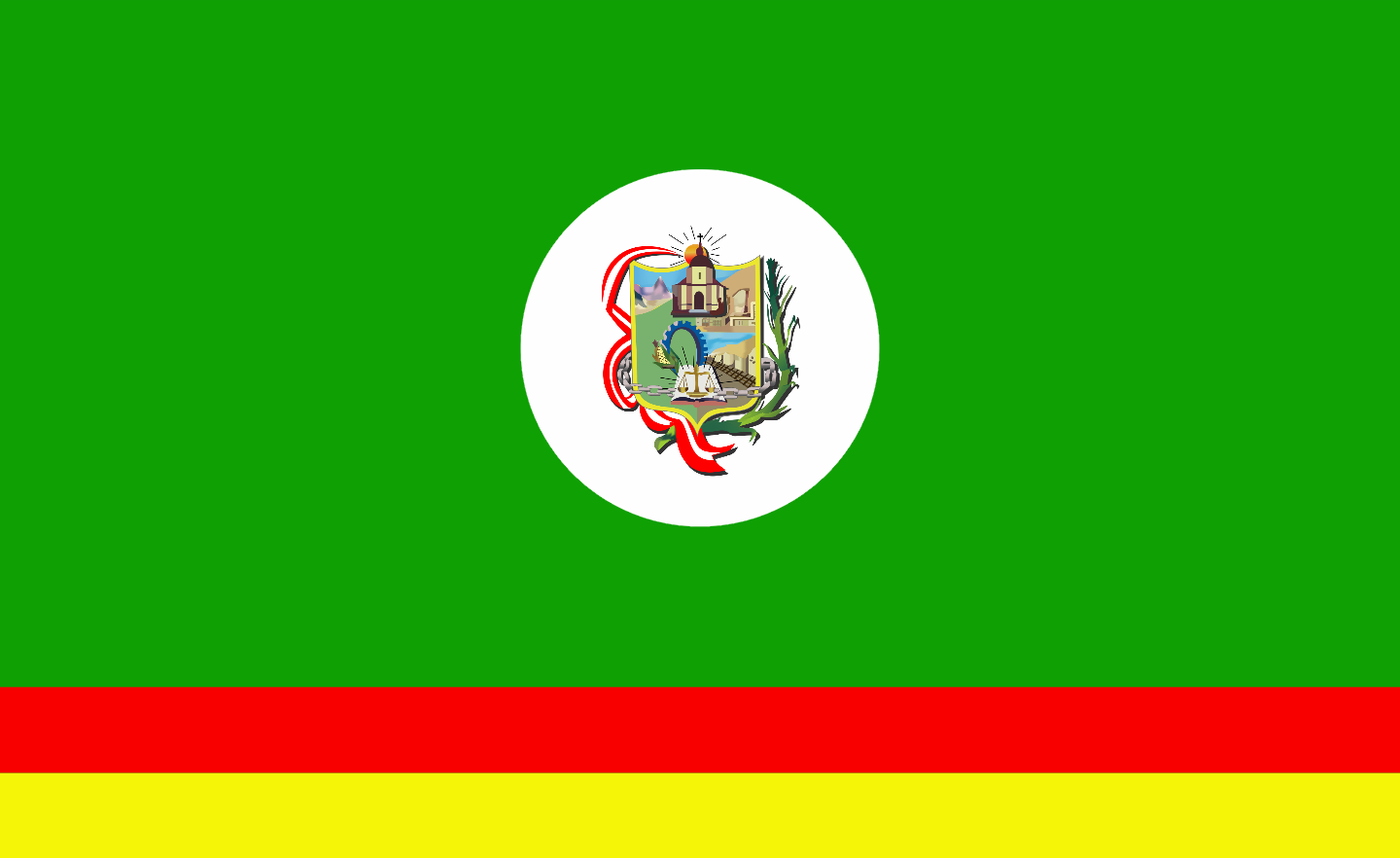
- Flag

- Location in Peru
- Coordinates: 8°5′11.51″S 78°57′35.35″W
- Country: Peru
- Region: La Libertad
- Province: Trujillo
- Founded: December 28, 1961

Government
  - Type: Mayor–council government
  - Mayor: Javier Rodriguez Vasquez (2019-2022)
- Elevation: 89 m (292 ft)

Population
  - Estimate (2017): 35,921
- Time zone: UTC-5 (PET)
- Area code: 044
- Demonym: (Spanish: laredino/a)
- Website: Municipality of Laredo

Laredo is the city capital of Laredo District located 9 km from Trujillo, in La Libertad Region, Peru.

== History ==
The population of Laredo grew and the authorities asked President Alan Garcia to enact Law No. 25253, which was passed on June 19, 1990, giving Laredo the policy rank of a city, and extending its boundaries.

== Education ==
- Technological Institute of Laredo, It provides education in careers of accounting, nursing and computer science. It is located in Los Laureles avenue of Laredo city.

== Economy ==
The city is located in a valley with high agricultura production of sugar cane. Near the city is located the agro industrial company Sol de Laredo, which produces sugar and its derivates.

== Festivals ==
- Carnival of Conache

== Tourism ==
- Lake Conache, located close to the town Conache.
Laredo
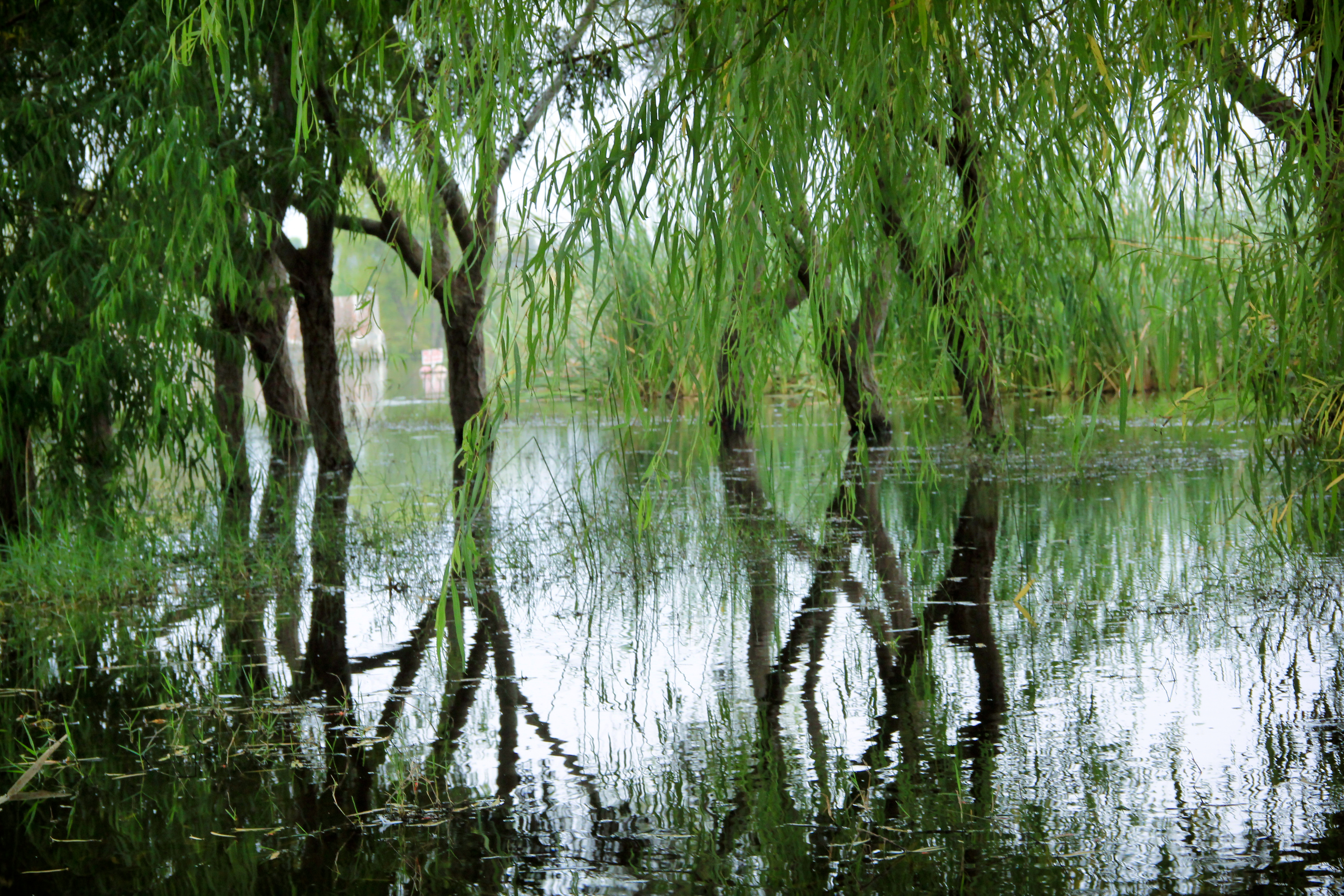
Lake Conache

== See also ==
- Trujillo
- Trujillo Province
- La Libertad Region
- Laredo District
- Lake Conache
