= Countryside of Simbal =

Rural area in Simbal District, Peru

The Countryside of Simbal is a rural area located about 25 km west of Trujillo city. It is located in Simbal District and It is a place with recreational centers, agricultural areas, etc. It is visited mainly by people from Trujillo to spend weekends and for practicing adventure sports.

== Description ==
It is characterized as a place of contact with nature, the countryside has cottages, countryside recreation centers, recreation center including River Bar which is located in the valley of a river between two mountains. In the countryside there are hostels for the night, Simbal is ripe for adventure sports at its rugged terrain.

== See also ==
- Simbal District
- Countryside of Moche
- Trujillo
