= Poroto District =

Poroto
- District
- Interactive map of Poroto
- Country: Peru
- Region: La Libertad
- Province: Trujillo
- Founded: March 7, 1964
- Capital: Poroto

Government
  - Mayor: Rufino Heraldo Alfaro Avila

Area
  - Total: 276.01 km^{2} (106.57 sq mi)
- Elevation: 627 m (2,057 ft)

Population (2005 census)
  - Total: 3,741
  - Density: 13.55/km^{2} (35.10/sq mi)
- Time zone: UTC-5 (PET)
- UBIGEO: 130108

Poroto District is one of eleven districts of the province Trujillo in Peru.

== Festivals ==
- Regional Fair of the Pineapple it is held in the town of Poroto.

== Localities ==
Some localities in Poroto district are:

- Shirán
- San Antonio
- San Bartolo
