= La Esperanza, Peru =

La Esperanza
- Town
- Location within Peru
- Coordinates: 8°4′58.61″S 79°2′27.59″W
- Country: Peru
- Region: La Libertad
- Province: Trujillo
- District: La Esperanza
- Time zone: UTC-5 (PET)

La Esperanza is a city in Northern Peru, capital of the district La Esperanza in Trujillo Province of the region La Libertad. This city is located some 4 km north of the Historic Centre of Trujillo city.

== Nearby cities ==
- Trujillo, Peru
- Víctor Larco Herrera

== See also ==
- La Libertad Region
- Simbal
- Moche River
