= La Esperanza District, Trujillo =

La Esperanza
- District
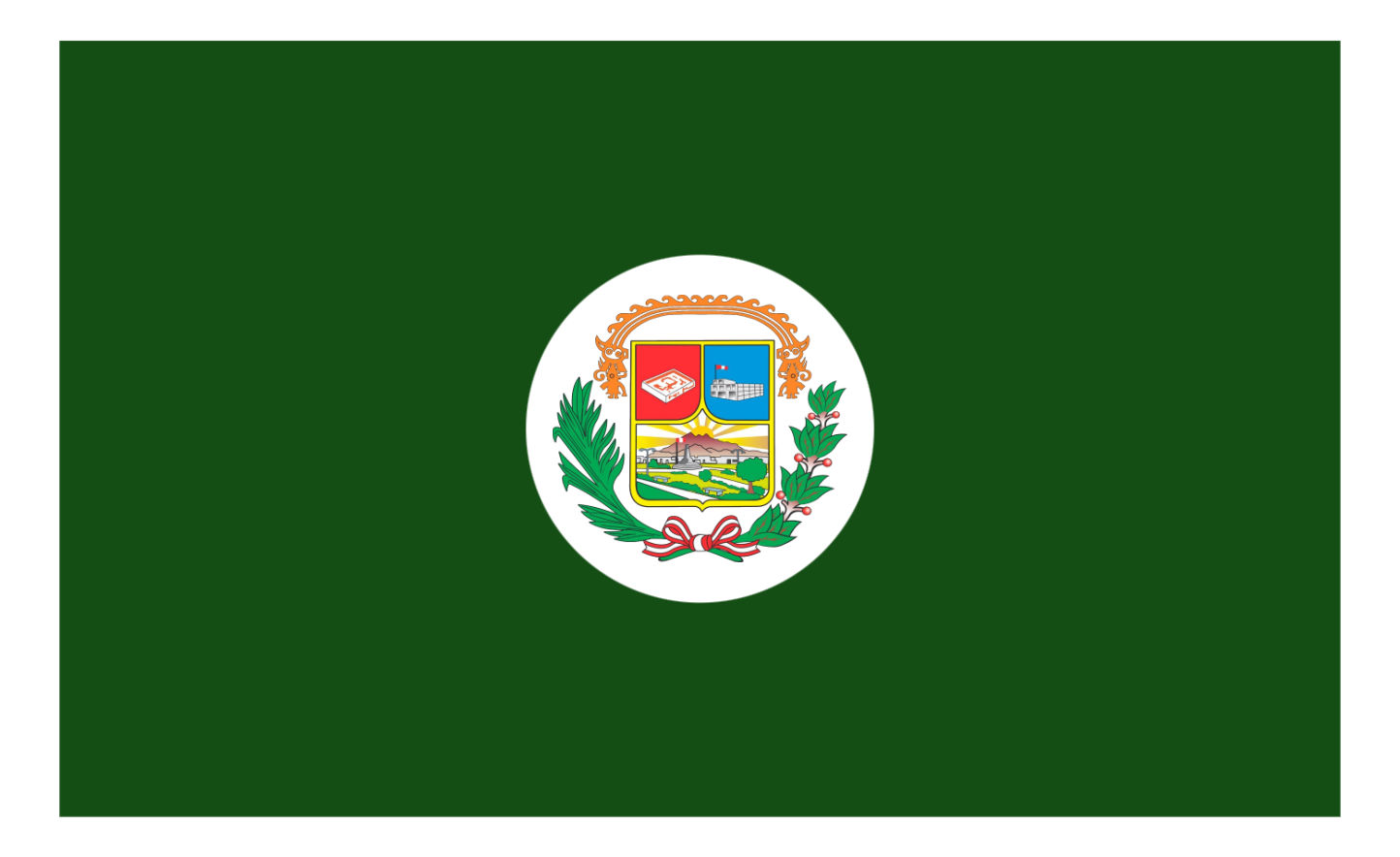
- Flag Coat of arms
- Interactive map of La Esperanza
- Country: Peru
- Region: La Libertad
- Province: Trujillo
- Founded: January 29, 1965
- Capital: La Esperanza
- Subdivisions: 1 populated center

Government
  - Mayor: Daniel Marcelo Jacinto

Area
  - Total: 15.55 km^{2} (6.00 sq mi)
- Elevation: 77 m (253 ft)

Population (2005 census)
  - Total: 146,678
  - Density: 9,433/km^{2} (24,430/sq mi)
- Time zone: UTC-5 (PET)
- UBIGEO: 130105
- Website: munilaesperanza.gob.pe

La Esperanza District is one of eleven districts of the Trujillo Province in the La Libertad region, Peru.

== Location ==
La Esperanza District is located in the North - Center of Trujillo Province, between latitudes 08° 04′ 30″ south latitude and 79° 02′ 38″ W, at a distance approximately of 01 km from the main square of Trujillo city.

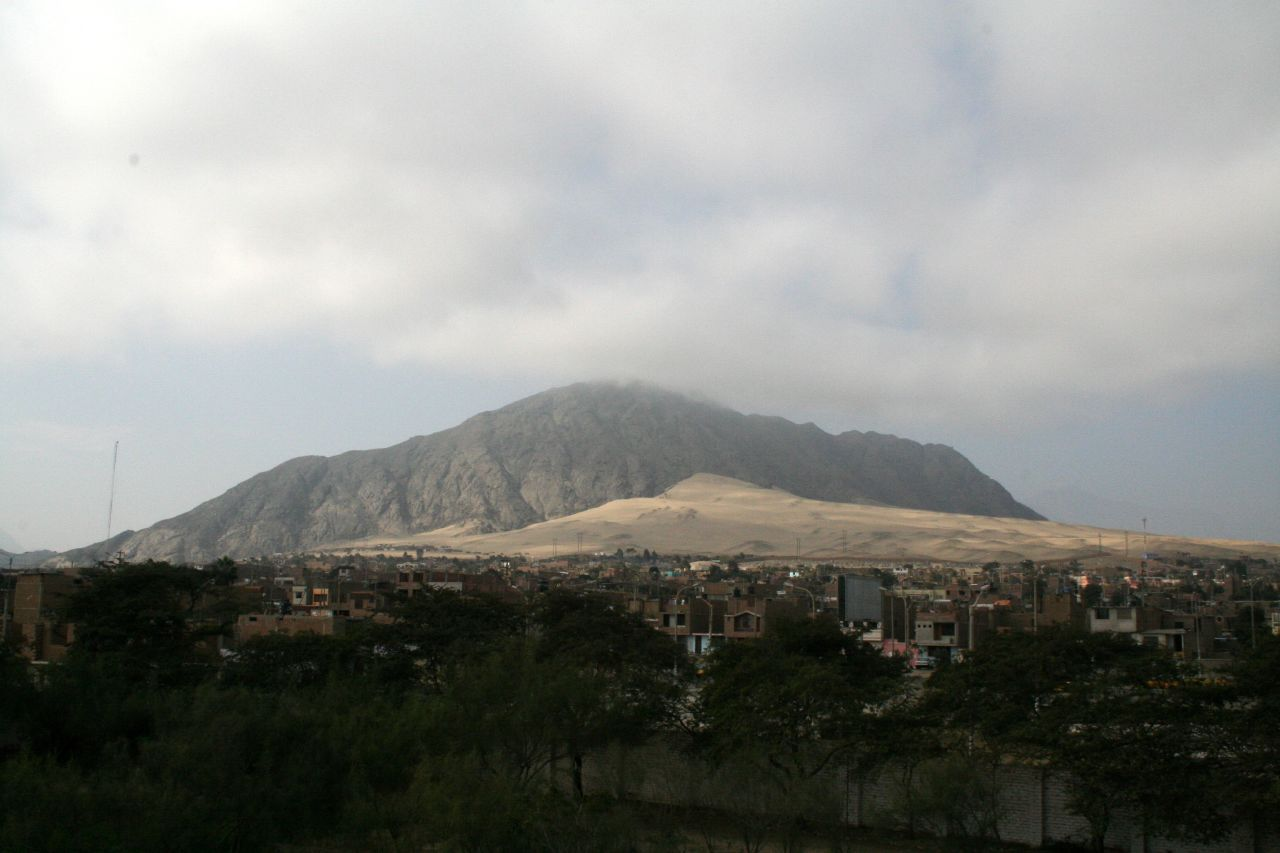
View of La Esperanza District
