= Salaverry District =

Salaverry
- District
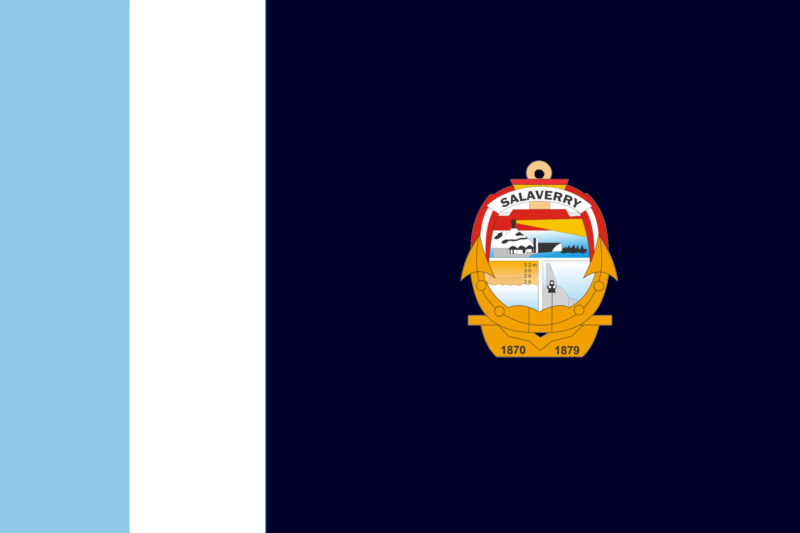
- Flag
- Interactive map of Salaverry
- Country: Peru
- Region: La Libertad
- Province: Trujillo
- Founded: January 4, 1879
- Capital: Salaverry

Government
  - Mayor: Miguel Angel Martinez Vargas Durango

Area
  - Total: 295.88 km^{2} (114.24 sq mi)
- Elevation: 3 m (9.8 ft)

Population (2005 census)
  - Total: 13,151
  - Density: 44.447/km^{2} (115.12/sq mi)
- Time zone: UTC-5 (PET)
- UBIGEO: 130109

Salaverry District is one of eleven districts of the province Trujillo in Peru.

== See also ==
- Trujillo Province
- Buenos Aires
- Trujillo
