= Simbal District =

Simbal
- District
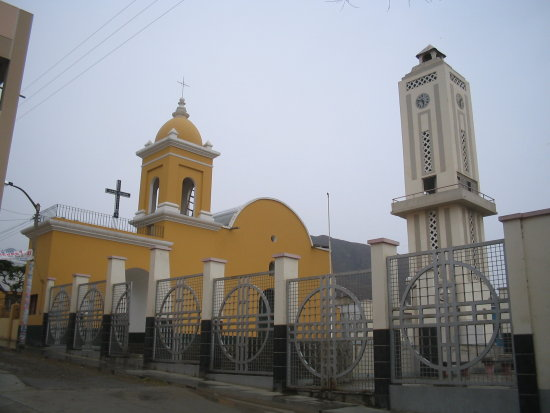
- San Juan Bautista church in Simbal
- Interactive map of Simbal
- Country: Peru
- Region: La Libertad
- Province: Trujillo
- Capital: Simbal

Government
  - Mayor: Javier Zalatiel Castañeda Carranza

Area
  - Total: 390.55 km^{2} (150.79 sq mi)
- Elevation: 576 m (1,890 ft)

Population (2005 census)
  - Total: 4,164
  - Density: 10.66/km^{2} (27.61/sq mi)
- Time zone: UTC-5 (PET)
- UBIGEO: 130110

Simbal District is one of eleven districts of the province Trujillo in Peru.
