= Florencia de Mora District =

District in La Libertad, Peru

Coordinates: 8°05′S 79°01′W

Florencia de Mora
- District
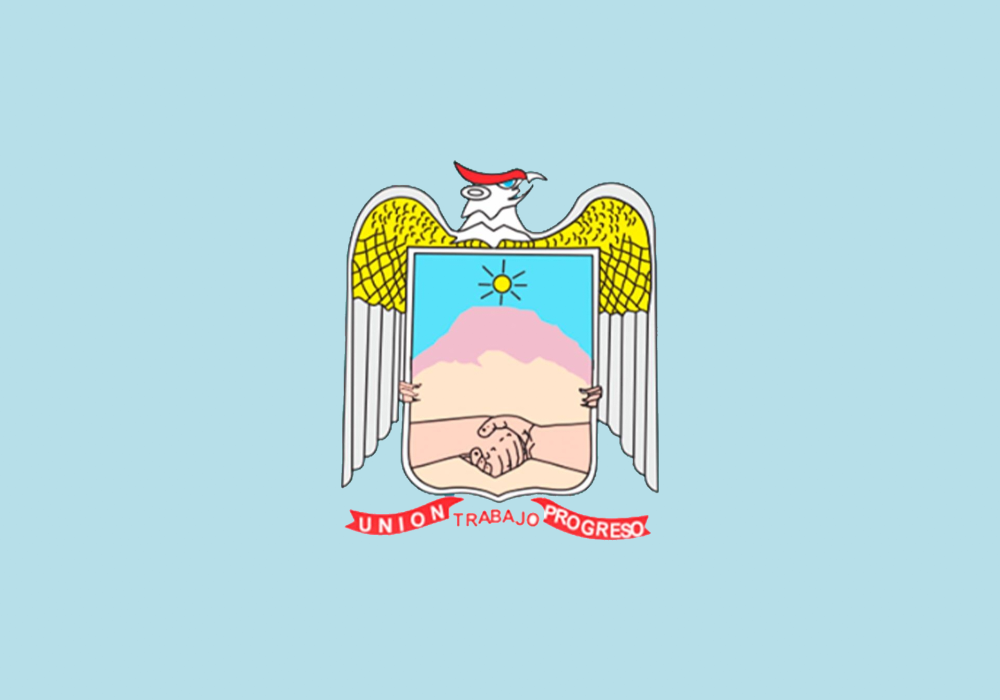
- Flag Coat of arms
- Interactive map of Florencia de Mora
- Country: Peru
- Region: La Libertad
- Province: Trujillo
- Founded: September 17, 1985
- Capital: Florencia de Mora

Government
  - Mayor: Wilson Enrique Toribio Vereau

Area
  - Total: 1.99 km^{2} (0.77 sq mi)
- Elevation: 85 m (279 ft)

Population (2005 census)
  - Total: 37,417
  - Density: 18,800/km^{2} (48,700/sq mi)
- Time zone: UTC-5 (PET)
- UBIGEO: 130103

Florencia de Mora District is one of eleven districts of the province Trujillo in Peru.
