= Trujillo District =

Coordinates: 8°10′S 79°01′W

Trujillo
- District
- Interactive map of Trujillo
- Country: Peru
- Region: La Libertad
- Province: Trujillo
- Capital: Trujillo

Government
  - Mayor: Daniel Marcelo Jacinto (2019-2022)

Area
  - Total: 39.36 km^{2} (15.20 sq mi)
- Elevation: 34 m (112 ft)

Population (2017)
  - Total: 314,939
  - Density: 8,001/km^{2} (20,720/sq mi)
- Time zone: UTC-5 (PET)
- UBIGEO: 130101
- Website: www.munitrujillo.gob.pe

Trujillo District is one of eleven districts of the province Trujillo in Peru. This district is the heart of the city of Trujillo, because it is the commercial and financial center of the city. The most important malls, banks and other business of the city are located in this district.

== Neighborhoods ==
This is a list of the urban areas and neighborhoods that belong to this district.

- Centro Histórico
- San Andrés
- La Merced
- El Recreo
- Monserrate
- La Perla
- Mansiche
- San Salvador
- El Alambre
- Las Capullanas
- Trupal
- San Nicolás
- Covicorti
- Santa Inés
- San Fernando
- San Isidro
- Primavera
- Las Quintanas
- Huerta Grande
- Miraflores
- Los Jardines
- Los Cedros
- Mochica
- El Molino
- La Intendencia
- Aranjuez
- Palermo
- Santa María
- Chicago
- El Sol
- Las Casuarinas
- Los Pinos
- Vista Hermosa
- La Arboleda
- San Eloy
- Ingeniería
- Pay Pay
- Santa Teresa de Avila
- Daniel Hoyle
- Los Granados
- Chimú
- La Rinconada
- Rázuri
- Vista Bella
- Santo Dominguito
- Los Rosales de San Andrés
- La Noria
- El Bosque

== See also ==
- List of districts of La Libertad Region
- Trujillo Province
