= Huanchaco District =

- District
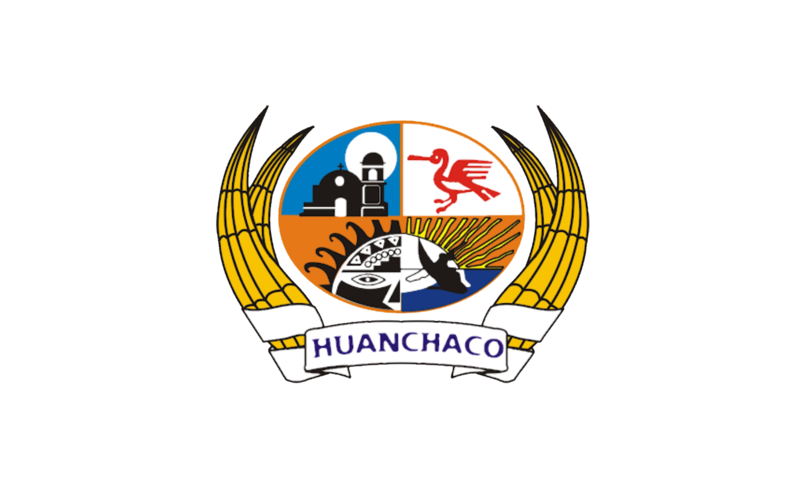
- Flag Coat of arms
- Interactive map of Huanchaco District
- Country: Peru
- Region: La Libertad
- Province: Trujillo
- Capital: Huanchaco

Government
  - Mayor: Jose Ruiz Vega (2019-2022)

Area
  - Total: 333.9 km^{2} (128.9 sq mi)
- Elevation: 23 m (75 ft)

Population (2017)
  - Total: 68,409
  - Density: 204.9/km^{2} (530.6/sq mi)
- Time zone: UTC-5 (PET)
- UBIGEO: 130104

Huanchaco District is one of eleven districts of the province Trujillo, located in La Libertad Region, Peru. The district in the year 2017 had 68,409 inhabitants.

Huanchaco is one of the tourist districts of Trujillo, has several tourist attractions, starting with the citadel of Chan Chan, the hill called "Cerro Campana" beaches like Huanchaco beach, Playa Azul, La Ribera, La Poza, El Silencio, El elio, etc. In Huanchaco there are multiple restaurants, hotels, lodges and private residences with ocean views. Huanchaco annually receives tourists from all over the world especially in summer, the horses of reeds or "caballitos de totora", among other attractions is most appreciated by holidaymakers.

== Populated places ==
- Huanchaco
- El Milagro

== See also ==
- Trujillo
- Victor Larco city
- La Libertad Region
