= El Porvenir District, Trujillo =

District in La Libertad, Peru

El Porvenir
- District
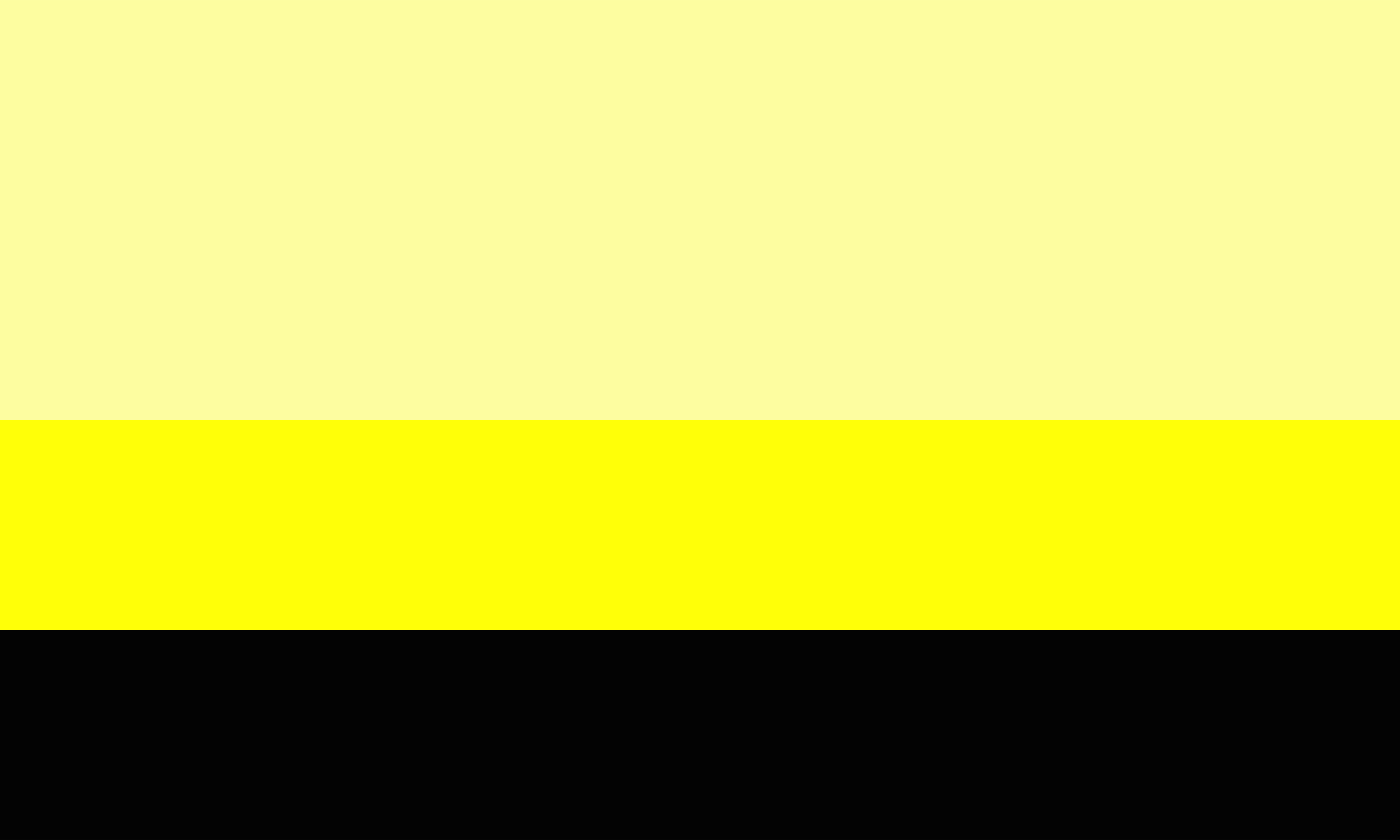
- Flag Coat of arms

- Location within Peru
- Country: Peru
- Region: La Libertad
- Province: Trujillo
- Founded: January 8, 1965
- Capital: El Porvenir

Government
  - Mayor: Angel Rodriguez Armas (2019-2022)

Area
  - Total: 36.7 km^{2} (14.2 sq mi)
- Elevation: 90 m (300 ft)

Population (2017)
  - Total: 190,461
  - Density: 5,190/km^{2} (13,400/sq mi)
- Time zone: UTC-5 (PET)
- UBIGEO: 130102

El Porvenir District is one of eleven districts of the province Trujillo in Peru.

== Festivals ==
- International Calzaferia El Porvenir is an annual footwear fair and in 2012 had its 10th. It is held in El Porvenir city.

== Climate ==
Climate data for Pelejo, El Porvenir, elevation 141 m (463 ft), (1991–2020)
Month	Jan	Feb	Mar	Apr	May	Jun	Jul	Aug	Sep	Oct	Nov	Dec	Year
Mean daily maximum °C (°F)	31.4 (88.5)	31.2 (88.2)	31.2 (88.2)	31.6 (88.9)	31.6 (88.9)	31.4 (88.5)	31.7 (89.1)	33.0 (91.4)	33.6 (92.5)	32.4 (90.3)	31.9 (89.4)	31.5 (88.7)	31.9 (89.4)
Mean daily minimum °C (°F)	22.3 (72.1)	22.0 (71.6)	22.1 (71.8)	22.2 (72.0)	21.9 (71.4)	21.0 (69.8)	20.4 (68.7)	20.5 (68.9)	21.3 (70.3)	22.0 (71.6)	22.3 (72.1)	22.2 (72.0)	21.7 (71.0)
Average precipitation mm (inches)	177.4 (6.98)	201.6 (7.94)	232.0 (9.13)	211.2 (8.31)	156.2 (6.15)	92.8 (3.65)	91.0 (3.58)	83.4 (3.28)	132.3 (5.21)	179.4 (7.06)	211.9 (8.34)	218.5 (8.60)	1,987.7 (78.23)
Source: National Meteorology and Hydrology Service of Peru
