= Lake Conache =

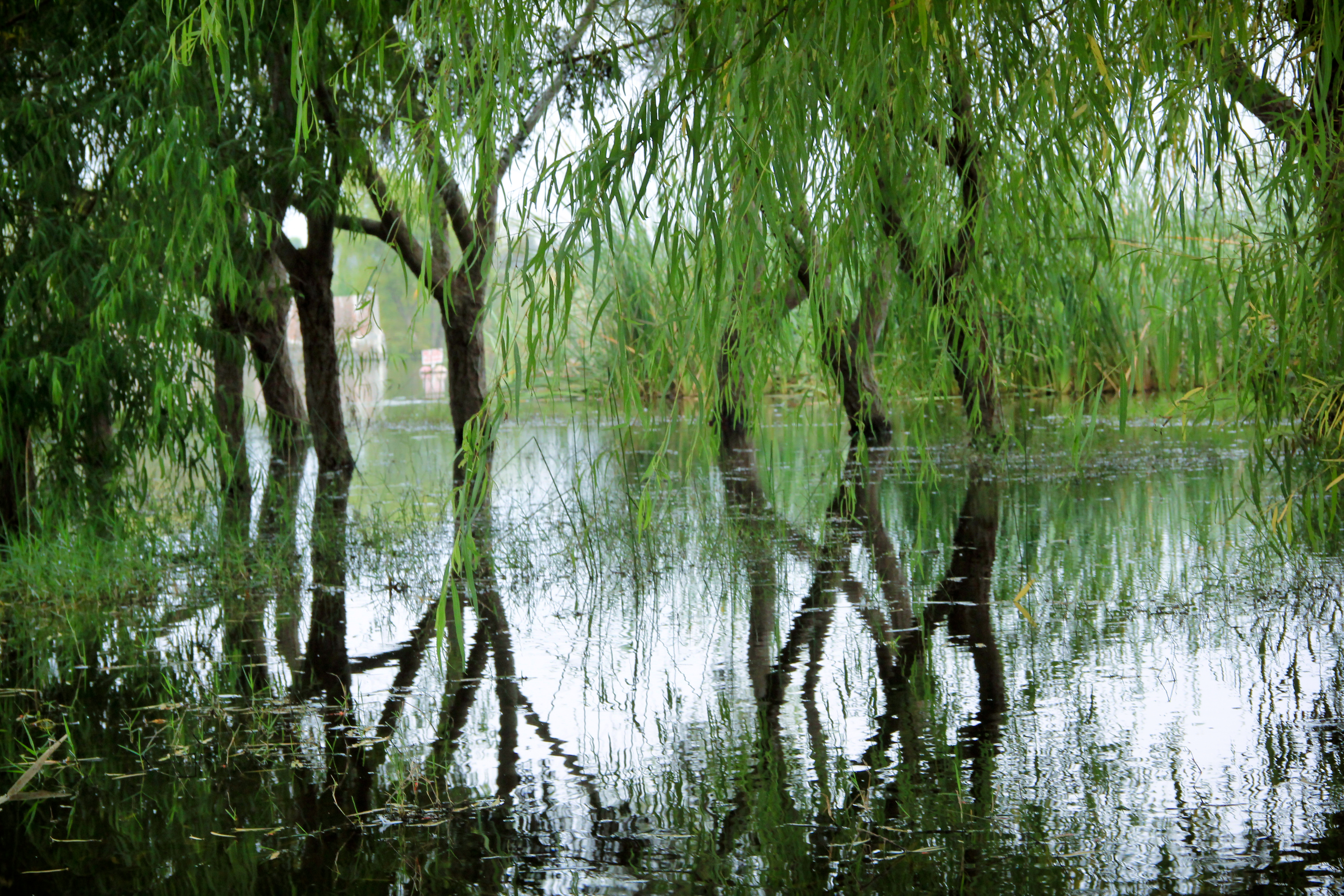
- View of the lake Conache in Laredo.

- Location within Peru
- Location: Laredo District
- Coordinates: 8°7′40″S 78°57′14″W
- Type: lake
- Basin countries: Peru
- Surface area: 0.09 km^{2} (0 sq mi)
- Average depth: 15 m (49 ft)
- Settlements: Trujillo; Laredo

Lake Conache is located in the village of Conache, in Laredo District, near Trujillo in the Peruvian region La Libertad.

== Description ==
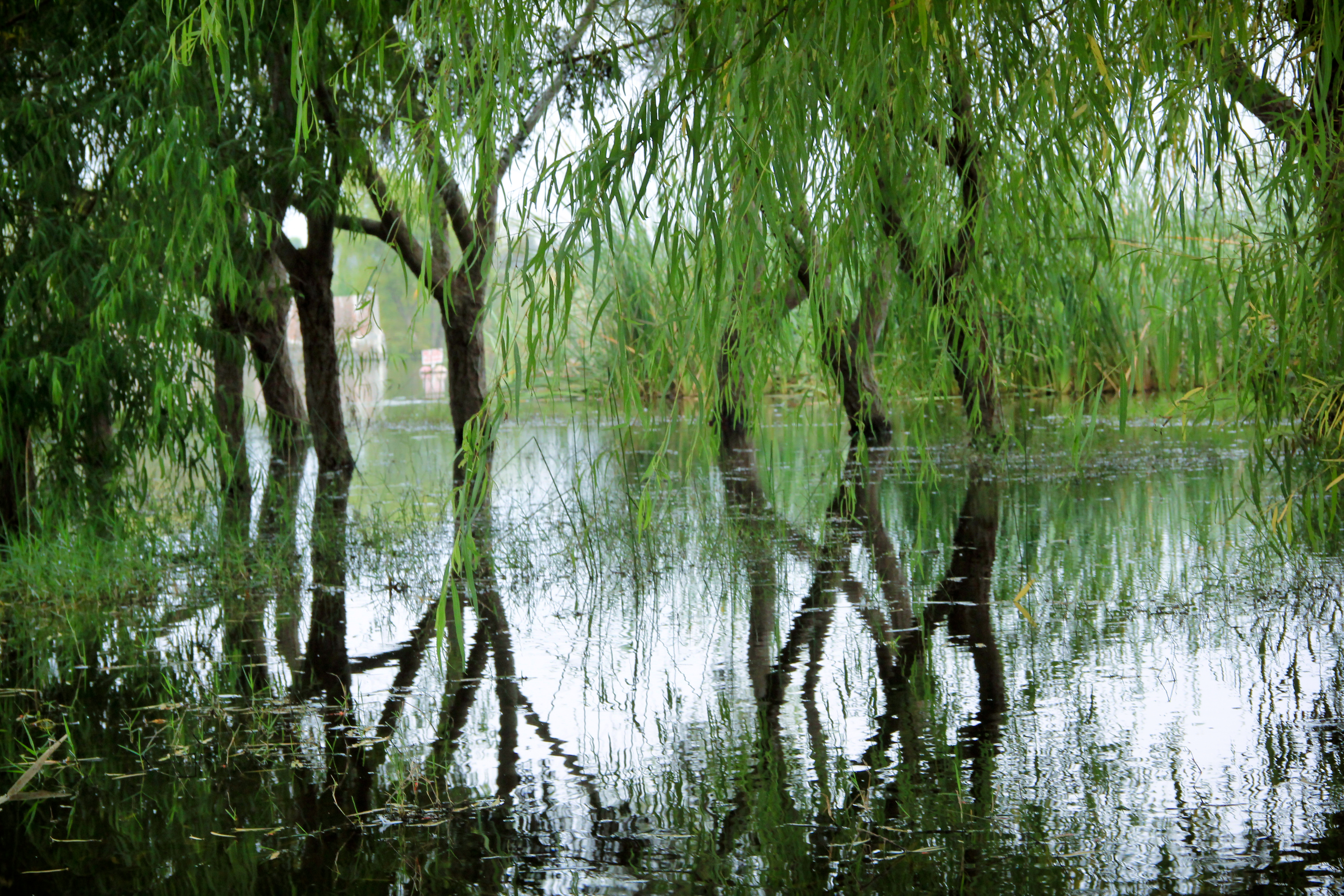
Lake Conache

This lake has an area of approximately 9 hectares, and is close to the Pampas de San Juan, jurisdiction of the town called Santo Domingo in Laredo district.

The lake is next to large dunes that are visited to practice Sandboarding (table sport on sand). In addition, near the lagoon Conache are extensive forests of carob presenting a variety of wildlife, and are visited by tourists; they are a complementary attraction to the lake, visited for a swim, a boat ride or a fish called tilapia.

== Origin of the Lake ==
Formerly, the Lake Conache was seasonal and formed during the rainy season in the area, and dried up some months later. But after completing the second phase of the special project of irrigation Chavimochic, with the continuous flood irrigation of the crops in the Pampas de San Juan, the water table increased gradually by the leaks, and the lake came to have water permanently and has been growing in volume.

== Fauna ==
The lake has varied wildlife: egrets, chiscos, wild ducks, tilapia, freshwater fish and gallinetas, charcoca as can be observed. In some months of the year, flocks of birds migrate to this habitat for nesting.

== Flora ==
Mainly it is observed the presence of cattails and reeds that grow rapidly in the lagoon. Abundant carob trees surround the lake.

== See also ==
- Trujillo
- Laredo District
- Conache
