= Trujillo province, Peru =

Coordinates: 8.117°S 79.033°W

Trujillo
- Province
- Flag Coat of arms

- Location of Trujillo in La Libertad Region
- Country: Peru
- Region: La Libertad
- Capital: Trujillo

Government
  - Mayor: Daniel Marcelo Jacinto

Area
  - Total: 1,768.65 km^{2} (682.88 sq mi)
- Elevation: 34 m (112 ft)

Population
  - Total: 970,016
  - Density: 548.450/km^{2} (1,420.48/sq mi)
- UBIGEO: 1301

Trujillo is one of twelve provinces in La Libertad Region in Peru.

== Boundaries ==
It borders to the north with the province of Ascope, to the east with the province of Otuzco, to the south with the province of Virú, and to the west with the Pacific Ocean.

== Political division ==
The province has an area of 1,768.65 square kilometers (682.88 sq mi) and is divided into twelve districts. Nine of these are part of the Trujillo metropolitan area. The districts of the province are:

- Trujillo
- Alto Trujillo
- El Porvenir
- Florencia de Mora
- Huanchaco
- La Esperanza
- Laredo
- Moche
- Poroto
- Salaverry
- Simbal
- Víctor Larco Herrera

== Capital ==
The capital of the province is the city of Trujillo, the third largest in the country.

== Population by districts ==
The next table shows the population by districts and some complementary data.

Trujillo Province
Districts of Trujillo Province	Datos por cada Distrito							
Districts of Trujillo Province	Capital	Elevation media (msl)	Distance (Approx.) to Trujillo (km)	Ubigeo	Area (km^{2})	Density 2014 (inhabitants/km^{2})	Population 2007	Population 2014 (Est.)
1. Trujillo	Trujillo	34	0	130101	39.36	8076.5	294899	317893
2. Victor Larco Herrera	Buenos Aires	3	5	130111	18.02	3513.7	55781	63317
3. La Esperanza	La Esperanza	77	4	130105	18.64	9624.8	151845	179407
4. El Porvenir	El Porvenir	90	4	130102	36.70	4924.1	140507	180716
5. Huanchaco	Huanchaco	23	12	130104	333.90	194.5	44806	64957
6. Florencia de Mora	Florencia de Mora	85	5	130101	1.99	21080.4	40014	41950
7. Laredo	Laredo	89	7	130106	335.44	104.9	32825	35200
8. Moche	Moche	4	7	130107	25.25	1349.5	29727	34074
9. Salaverry	Salaverry	3	14	130109	390.55	45.1	13892	17633
10. Poroto	Poroto		40	130108	276.01	11.8	3601	3267
11. Simbal	Simbal		40	130110	390.55	11.0	4082	4315
Province				1301	1768.65	533.0	811979	942729
Sources: Population 2007 : Census 2007 INEI; Estimated Population 2012 : Estimates of INEI

== See also ==
- Trujillo city
- Víctor Larco city
- Virú province
- Ascope province
- Otuzco province
- Trujillo metropolitan area
