= Laredo District =

Laredo
- District
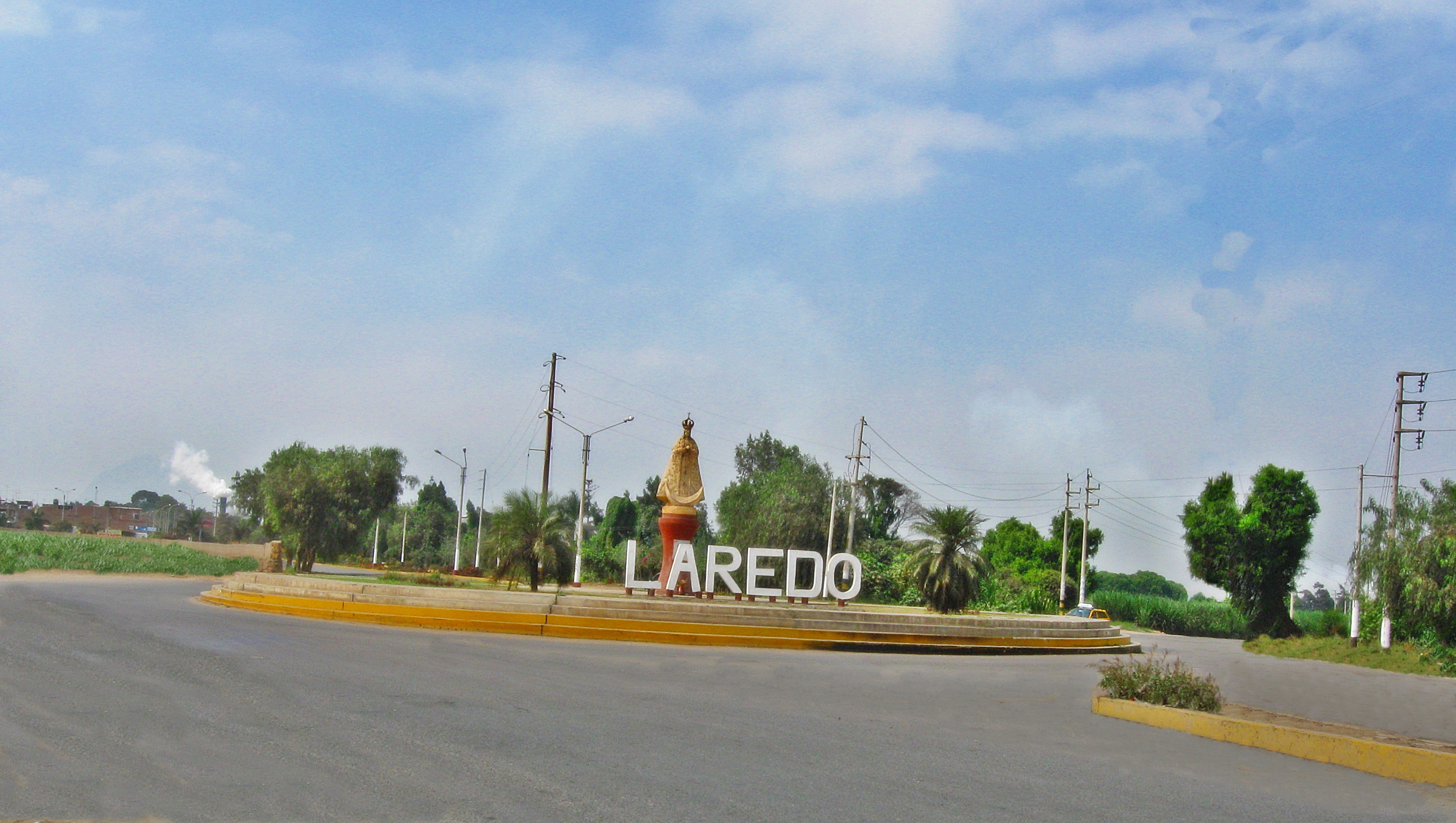

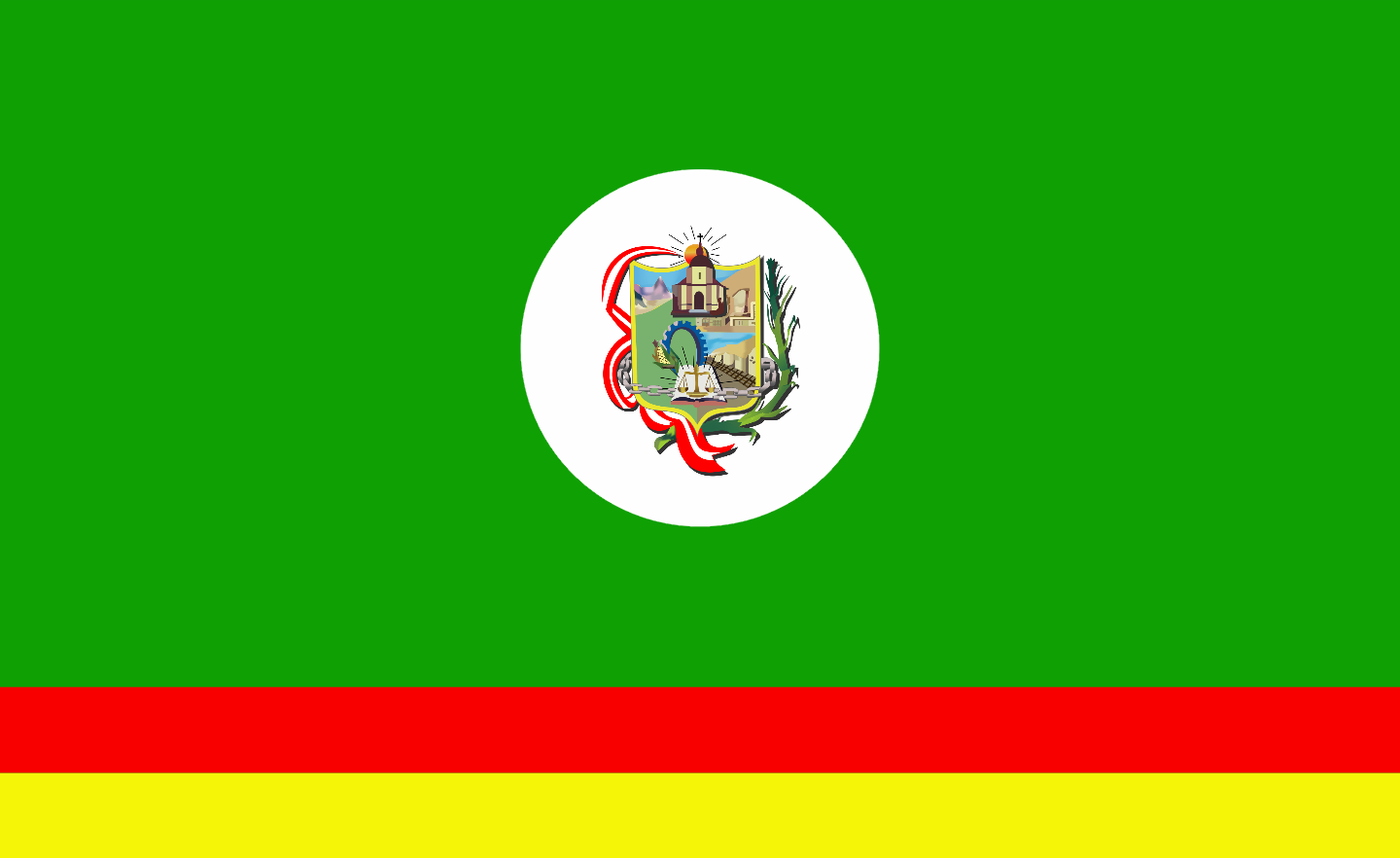
- Flag Coat of arms
- Interactive map of Laredo
- Country: Peru
- Region: La Libertad
- Province: Trujillo
- Founded: December 28, 1961
- Capital: Laredo

Government
  - Mayor: Javier Rodriguez Vasquez (2019-2022)

Area
  - Total: 335.44 km^{2} (129.51 sq mi)
- Elevation: 89 m (292 ft)

Population (2017)
  - Total: 37,206
  - Density: 110.92/km^{2} (287.27/sq mi)
- Time zone: UTC-5 (PET)
- UBIGEO: 130106
- Website: munilaredo.gob.pe

Laredo District is one of eleven districts of the Trujillo Province in the La Libertad region, Peru.

== Populated places ==
Some of the populated places in Laredo districts are the following:

- Conache
- Laredo
- Barraza
- Menocucho
- Quirihuac
- Santo Domingo
- Bello Horizonte
