= Simbal =

- Town
- Location within Peru
- Coordinates: 7°58′34.85″S 78°48′49.08″W
- Country: Peru
- Region: La Libertad
- Province: Trujillo
- District: Simbal
- Time zone: UTC-5 (PET)

Simbal is a town in Northern Peru, capital of the district Simbal in Trujillo Province of the region La Libertad. This town is located some 40 km east of Trujillo city and is primarily an agricultural center in the Valley of Moche.

== Nearby cities ==
- Trujillo, Peru
- Víctor Larco Herrera
- Otuzco

== See also ==
- La Libertad Region
- Poroto
- Moche River
