= Sechin =

Sechin may refer to:

- Sechin (surname)
- Séchin, a commune in France
- Cerro Sechin, an archaeological site in Peru
- Sechin Alto, an archaeological site in Peru
- Sechin Bajo, an archaeological site in Peru
- Sechín River in Peru
