= Andean preceramic =

Early period of human occupation in the Andean area of South America

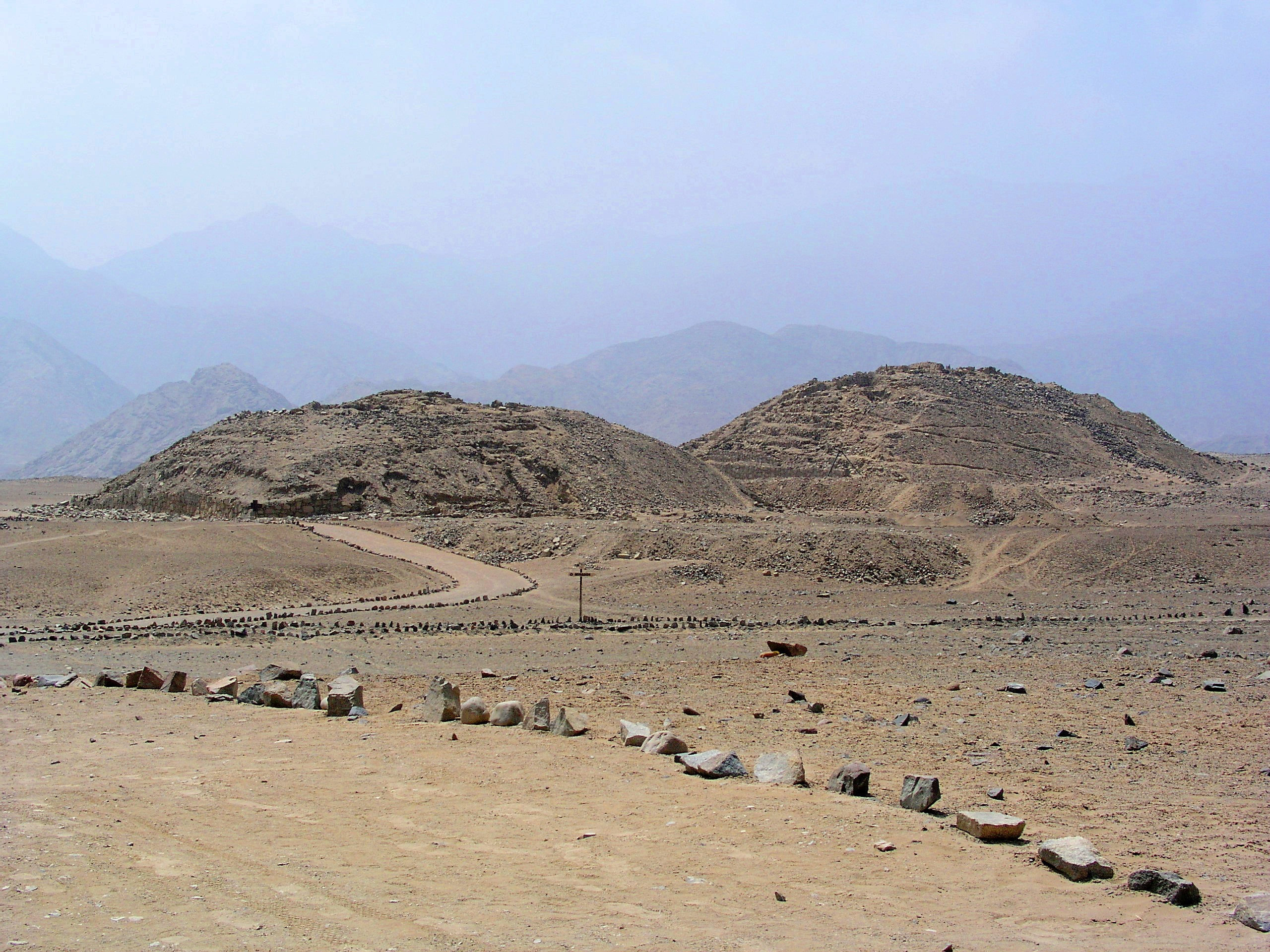
The Pyramids of Caral

The Andean preceramic refers to the early period of human occupation in the Andean area of South America that preceded the introduction of ceramics. This period is also called pre-ceramic or aceramic.

== Earliest human occupations ==
The earliest humans that came to South America are known as Paleo-Indians. This period is generally known as the Lithic stage. After this came the period that is widely known as Archaic, although there are also some different classifications of this period. The precise classification is complicated because somewhat different terminologies tend to be used for North America and Mesoamerica.

The Andean preceramic period would include cultures that belong to Lithic and Archaic stages.

== Preceramic in Peru ==
The Zaña Valley in northern Peru contains the earliest known canals in South America. These were small stone-lined canals which drew water from streams in the Andes Mountains region. These canals may have been built as early as 4700 BC.

A great deal of archaeological work has been done in Peru in relation to the preceramic cultures, and while Caral/Norte Chico civilization has now been studied extensively, there are also many other sites being studied.

=== Caral/Norte Chico civilization ===
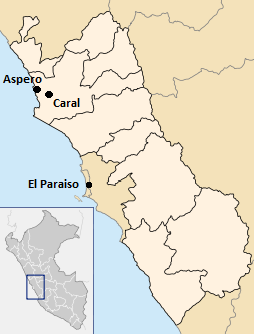
Map of Caral/Norte Chico sites showing their locations in Peru

Caral/Norte Chico is one of the most notable and well-studied cultures in Peruvian archaeology. The most impressive achievement of this civilization was its monumental architecture, including large earthwork platform mounds and sunken circular plazas. Also, these preceramic peoples built massive irrigation and water management projects.

Archaeological evidence suggests a very early use of textiles, and in particular the use of cotton. Also, recent studies (2013) indicate that maize played a significant role in this civilization starting as early as 3000 BC, contrary to previous findings. Beans and sweet potato were grown as well.

Caral/Norte Chico sites are notable for exceptional collective density, as well as individual size. Haas argues that the density of sites in such a small area is globally unique for a nascent civilization. During the third millennium BC, Caral/Norte Chico may have been the most densely populated area of the world (excepting, possibly, northern China). The Supe, Pativilca, Fortaleza, and Huaura River valleys each have several related sites.

==== Caral ====
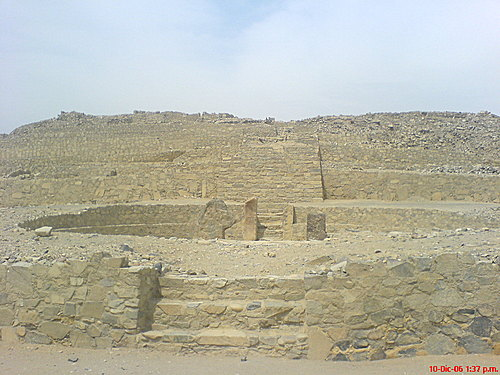
Caral ceremonial plaza

Caral is an important center of this civilization. The city was inhabited between 2600 and 2000 BCE, enclosing an area of more than 60 hectares.

Caral was first fully documented and analyzed by Dr. Ruth Shady Solís and other Peruvian archaeologists in the late 1990s. A 2001 paper in Science, providing a survey of the Caral research, and a 2004 article in Nature, describing fieldwork and radiocarbon dating across a wider area, revealed Norte Chico's full significance and led to widespread interest.

As a result, Caral/Norte Chico has pushed back the horizon for complex societies in the Peruvian region by more than one thousand years.

==== Huaricanga ====
Huaricanga, also in the Norte Chico region, is believed to be the earliest city of this civilization, and thus it would have been the oldest city in the Americas. It existed around 3500 BCE."

Besides the lack of pottery, a remarkable feature of this civilization is the apparent absence of any artistic or religious symbolism. Or at least they have not been identified so far.

Nevertheless, there is evidence for the worship of certain deities, such as the Staff God, a leering figure with a hood and fangs. The Staff God is a major deity of later Andean cultures, and it has been suggested that its use so early points to the worship of common symbols of gods for a long period of time.

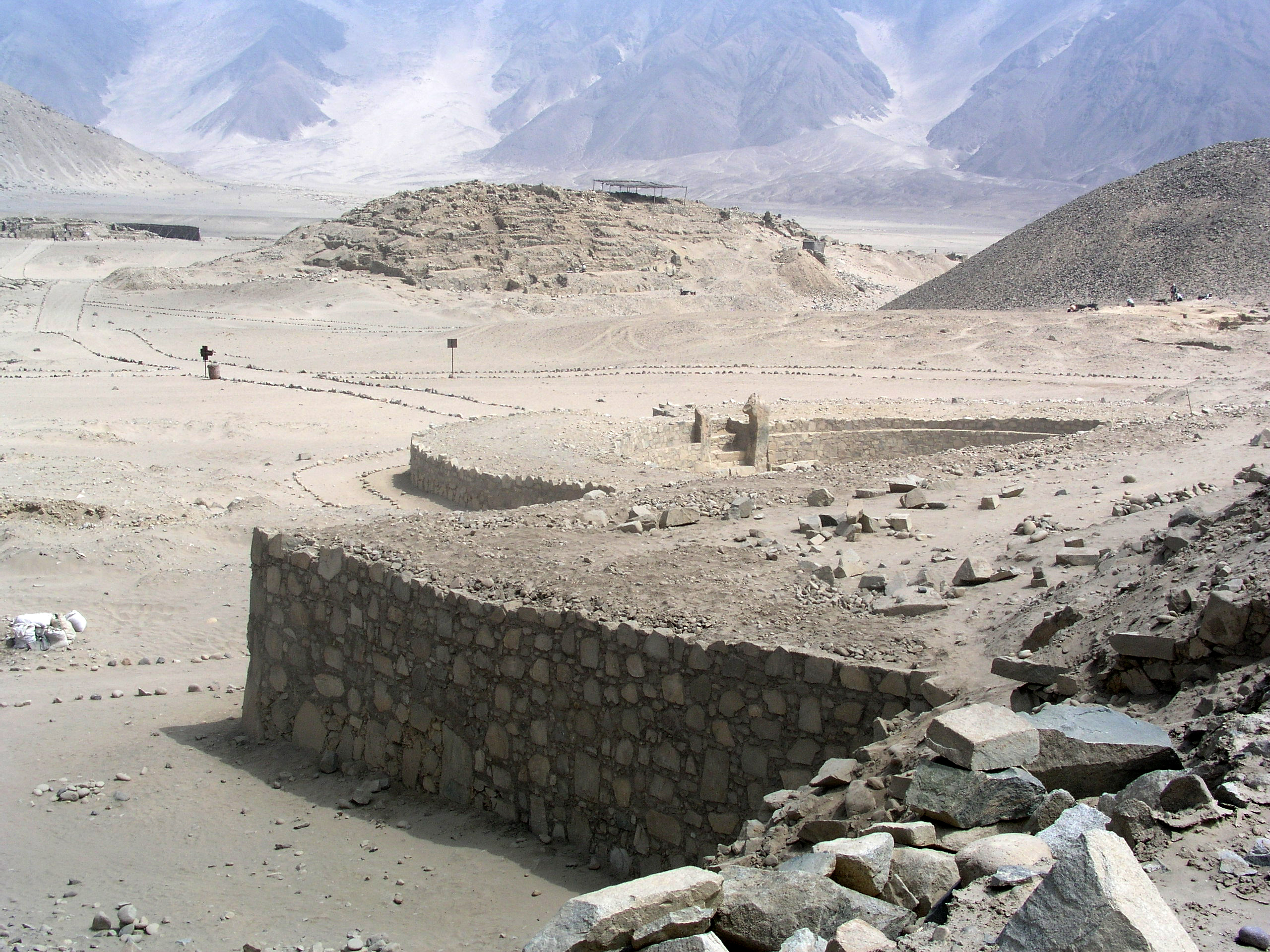
A view of Caral

Sophisticated government is assumed to have been required to manage the ancient Caral/Norte Chico. Questions still remain over its organization, particularly the influence of food resources on politics.

Some scholars suggested that Norte Chico was founded on seafood and maritime resources, rather than on the development of an agricultural cereal and crop surpluses, as has been considered essential to the rise of other ancient civilizations. Yet now these views are being revised because of strong evidence for maize consumption.

=== Casma and Sechin rivers ===
Several major preceramic archaeological sites are located in the valleys of the Casma River and its tributary the Sechin River. The largest among them is Sechin Alto; the other big mounds are Sechin Bajo, Mojeque, Cerro Sechin, Las Haldas and several others. The dates for these sites start at c. 3600 BCE.

=== Kotosh Religious Tradition ===
The Kotosh Religious Tradition is a term used by archaeologists to refer to the ritual buildings that were constructed in the mountain drainages of the Andes between circa 3000 and c.1800 BCE, during the Andean preceramic.^{[1]}

Archaeologists have identified and excavated a number of these ritual centers; the first of these to be discovered was that at Kotosh, although since then further examples have been found at Shillacoto, Wairajirca, Huaricoto, La Galgada and Piruru.^{[2]} These sites are all located in highland zones that are lower than the Puna, and yet there are considerable distances separating them. In spite of this, all these cases of highland preceramic public architecture are remarkably similar.^{[3]}

=== Other cultural traditions ===
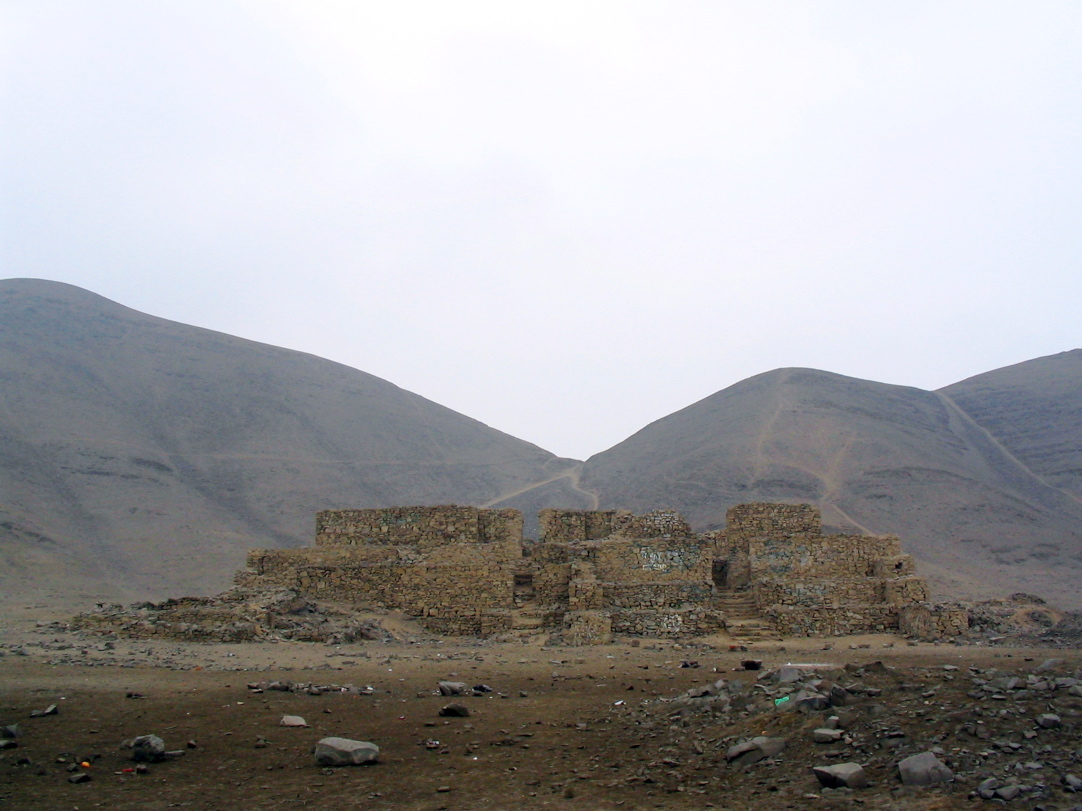
A pyramid at El Paraiso

El Paraiso, Peru is a very large early center in the Ancón-Chillón Valley, that may be somewhat related to the Norte Chico tradition. It is approximately from the same time frame as the above. It is just one of the six major preceramic sites in the Ancón-Chillón Valley, including Ancon (archaeological site).

Another important site is Bandurria, Peru, on the Huaura River, featuring monumental architecture that may go back to mid-fourth millennium BC.

In the northern Peruvian coast stand out sites such as Huaca Prieta, were the earliest recorded use of indigo dye to date was found and Huaca Ventarron, its painted murals are the oldest discovered in the Americas.

== Preceramic in Ecuador ==
In Ecuador, the Preceramic period is believed to have started around 9000 BC, and lasted until around 4200 BC. According to Jeffrey Quilter, Ecuador yielded plentiful evidence of early dense occupations of the highlands that is so far not found either in Peru or in Bolivia.

Along the Pacific Coast, the Las Vegas culture predominated, while up in the mountains, it was the Inga culture.

The Las Vegas culture is the first known culture in Ecuador. They lived on the Santa Elena Peninsula on the coast of Ecuador between 9000 and 6000 BC. The skeletal remains and other finds preserve much evidence of this culture.

Scientists have classified three phases of cultural development. The earliest people were hunter-gathers and fisherman. Approximately 6000 BC, these peoples were among the first to begin farming; among their early crops were bottle gourd, Lagenaria siceraria, and an early type of maize, Zea mays L.

El Inga peoples lived high in the mountains near present-day Quito, the capital of Ecuador. Evidence from the archeological site El Inca date the culture to 9000–8000 BC. Excavations were undertaken around 1961. It is believed that, from the archaeological perspective, this area is one of the most important in South America, and it may have existed along an ancient trade route.

Some of the tools used by these early nomadic hunters have provided relationships to the Clovis culture "Level I" at Fell's Cave in southern Chile, and technological relationships to the late Pleistocene "fluted point" complexes of North America.

== Preceramic in Colombia ==
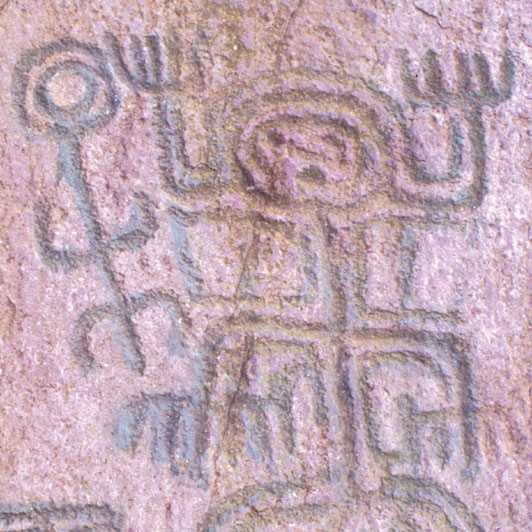
El Abra is the earliest evidence of inhabitation in central Colombia

El Abra is an important early human settlement site in Colombia with a large cave system. Its investigation started in 1967, and the stratigraphy of lithic instruments, bones and vegetal charcoal with radiocarbon dating established the date of the settlement in 12,400 BP ± 160 years. Other preceramic archaeological sites are Tibitó (11,850 BP), Tequendama, dated to 11,000 years BP, Checua (dated to 8500 BP), Aguazuque (5000 BP) and El Infiernito, dated to 4900 years BP.

== Preceramic in Bolivia ==
The earliest cultures of Bolivia are the Wankarani culture, and the Chiripa. The earliest Wankarani sites are dated from 1800 BC onwards. Wankarani culture arose in the area of the current Oruro Department in Bolivia near Lake Poopo. The Wankarani had developed a copper metallurgy by 1200 B.C.

The area of the Altiplano close to Bolivia yielded the earliest evidence of metalworking in South America. This is the site of Jisk'a Iru Muqu, also spelled Jiskairumoko, in the Lake Titikaka basin, which was first investigated in 1994. A necklace consisting of nine gold beads was found in an excavated grave located next to a Terminal Archaic pit-house. Charcoal recovered from the burial dates the gold beads to 2155-1936 cal BC

== Preceramic in Chile ==
Some of the early preceramic cultures flourished both in what is now Peru and Chile. This applies to the Chinchorro culture that was active in what is now northern Chile and southern Peru. This culture left us the Chinchorro mummies; these are the oldest examples of artificially mummified human remains in the world. The oldest mummy recovered from the Atacama Desert is dated around 7020 BC. This tradition is believed to have reached a peak around 3000 BC.

== See also ==
- Ceramics of Indigenous peoples of the Americas
- History of Andean South America
- Cultural periods of Peru
- Inhabitation of the Altiplano Cundiboyacense

== Bibliography ==
- Correal Urrego, Gonzalo (1990), "Evidencias culturales durante el Pleistocene y Holoceno de Colombia - Cultural evidences during the Pleistocene and Holocene of Colombia" (PDF), Revista de Arqueología Americana (in Spanish), 1: 69–89
- Dillehay, Tom (2000), The Settlement of the Americas: a new prehistory, New York: Basic Books
- Dillehay, Tom; Bonavia, Duccio; Kaulicke, Peter (2004), "The first settlers", Helaine Silverman Andean archaeology, Malden, MA: Blackwell, pp. 16–34
- Groot de Mahecha, Ana María (1992), Checua: Una secuencia cultural entre 8500 y 3000 años antes del presente - Checua: a cultural sequence between 8500 and 3000 years before present, Banco de la República, pp. 1–95
- Gómez Mejía, Juliana (2012), "Análisis de marcadores óseos de estrés en poblaciones del Holoceno Medio y Tardío incial de la sabana de Bogotá, Colombia - Analysis of bone stress markers in populations of the Middle and Late Holocene of the Bogotá savanna, Colombia", Revista Colombiana de Antropología (in Spanish), 48: 143–168, doi:10.22380/2539472X.1019
- Lanning, Edward P. (1967), Peru Before the Incas, Prentice Hall, Englewood Cliffs, N.J., ISBN 0-13-661595-3
- Lavallée, Danièle (2000), The first South Americans: the peopling of a continent from the earliest evidence to high culture, Salt Lake City: University of Utah
- Moseley, Michael (2004), The Incas and their ancestors: the archaeology of Peru, London: Thames and Hudson
- Quilter, Jeffrey (2013), The Ancient Central Andes, Routledge World Archaeology, ISBN 978-1317935247
