= List of archaeological sites in Peru =

Archaeological sites in Peru are numerous and diverse, representing different aspects including temples and fortresses of the various cultures of ancient Peru, such as the Moche and Nazca. The sites vary in importance from small local sites to UNESCO World Heritage sites of global importance. Their nature and complexity of the sites vary from small single-featured sites such as pyramids to entire cities, such as Chan Chan and Machu Picchu. Preservation and investigation of these sites are controlled mainly by the Culture Ministry (MINCUL) (Spanish: Ministerio de Cultura (Perú)). The lack of funding to protect sites and enforce existing laws, results in large scale looting and illegal trading of artifacts.

In the Archeology Geographic Information System prepared by the Ministry of Culture, you can see the location of all pre-Hispanic monuments of Perú.

== Sites ==
The following is an alphabetical list of archaeological sites in Peru, it lists the main archaeological sites of touristic importance as published by the Ministry of Foreign Commerce and Tourism.

Site	Image	Region	Culture	Period
Acaray		Lima		900–200 BC, 1000–1470 AD
Anku		Tantamayo, Huanuco	Chavin	3000-2500 BC
Aspero		Lima	Norte Chico	3000–1800 BC
Bandurria		Lima	Norte Chico	3000–1800 BC
El Brujo		La Libertad	Moche	100–750 AD
Buena Vista		Lima		8000–1000 BC
Cahuachi		Ica	Nazca	1–500 AD
Cantamarca		Lima	Canta	1100–1450 AD
La Centinela		Ica	Chincha	0900–1450 AD
Carajía	`	Amazonas	Chachapoya	1400–1500 AD
Caral		Lima	Norte Chico	3000–1800 BC
Chan Chan		La Libertad	Chimú	850–1470 AD
Chanquillo		Ancash	Casma/Sechin culture	300 BC
Chavin de Huantar		Ancash	Chavín	1200–400 BC
Chinchero		Cusco		
Choquequirao		Cusco	Inca	1536–1572 AD
Cumbemayo		Cajamarca	Cajamarca	1500 BC
El Paraíso		Chillon River Valley		3790–3065 cal BP
Garagay		Lima		1200 BC
Gran Pajatén		La Libertad	Chachapoyas	200 BC
Gran Saposoa		Amazonas	Chachapoyas	
Gran Vilaya		Amazonas	Chachapoyas	
Guitarrero Cave		Ancash		8000–7000 BC
Huaca de la Luna		La Libertad	Moche	450 AD
Huaca del Sol		La Libertad	Moche	450 AD
Huaca Huallamarca		Lima	Hualla	500–1450 AD
Huaca Pucllana		Lima; Miraflores	Lima	200–700 AD
Huaricanga		Lima Region	Norte Chico	3500-1800 BC
Huaycán de Pariachi		Lima	Ychma and Inca	1000-1500 AD
Huchuy Qosqo		Cuzco	Inca	1420-1530 AD
Inka Uyu		Puno		
Inka Wasi, Ayacucho		Ayacucho	Inca	
Inka Wasi, Huancavelica		Huancavelica	Inca	
Inti Punku		Cusco	Inca	
Inti Watana		Ayacucho	Inca	
Jisk'a Iru Muqu		Puno	South-Central Highland	3000–1400 BC
Kanamarka		Cusco		
Kuelap		Amazonas	Chachapoyas	1000–1400 AD
Kuntur Wasi		Cajamarca	Chavín	1000–700 BC
La Galgada		La Libertad	Kotosh Religious Tradition	2900–1800 BC
Las Haldas or Aldas		Ancash	Casma/Sechin culture	2200-300 BC
Llaqtapata		Cusco	Inca	
Machu Colca		Cusco	Inca	
Machu Picchu		Cusco	Inca	1450–1572 AD
Marayniyuq		Ayacucho	Wari	
Marcahuamachuco		La Libertad	Wari	
Moray		Cusco	Inca	
Nazca Lines		Nazca	Nazca	
Ñusta Hispana		Cusco	Inca	
Pachakamaq		Lima	Huari; Ichma; Lima; Inca	200–1450 AD
Paloma		Lima		c.5700-2800 BCE
Pañamarca		Ancash	Moche	100–900 AD
Paramonga		Lima	Chimú	1200–1450 AD
Patallaqta		Cusco	Inca	
Pernil Alto		Ica Region	Pre-ceramic archaic	
Phuyupatamarka		Cusco	Inca	
Pikillaqta		Cusco	Huari	500–1200 AD
Pikimach'ay		Ayacucho		12000 BC
Pinkuylluna		Cusco	Inca	
Pisac		Cusco	Inca	1440–1530 AD
Puka Pukara		Cusco	Inca	
Puruchuco		Lima	Ichma; Inca	1470–1532 AD
Qollmay		Cuzco	Inca	
Quispiguanca		Cuzco	Inca	1460-1530s AD
Qulu Qulu		Puno		
Qunchamarka		Cusco	Inca	
Qurikancha		Cusco	Inca	
Quriwayrachina		Cusco	Inca	
Q'inqu		Cusco	Inca	
Raqch'i		Cusco	Inca	1450–1532 AD
Rumiqullqa		Cusco	Wari, Inca	
Runkuraqay		Cusco	Inca	
Sacred Valley		Cusco	Inca	1000–1537 AD
Saksaywaman		Cusco	Killke and Inca	900–1532 AD
Sayhuite		Apurímac	Inca	
Sechin Alto		Ancash	Casma/Sechin culture	2000–1500 BCE
Sillustani		Puno	Colla	1200–1450 AD
Sipán		Lambayeque	Moche	50–700 AD
Suntur		Apurímac	Chanka	
Tambo Colorado		Ica	Inca	1470–1532 AD
Tampu Mach'ay		Cusco	Inca	1470–1532 AD
Tarawasi		Cusco	Inca	
Tarmatampu		Junín	Inca	1470–1532 AD
Tipón		Cusco	Inca	
Toquepala Caves		Tacna		7650 BC
Toro Muerto		Arequipa	Huari	900–1200 AD
Túcume		Lambayeque	Lambayeque, Chimú and Inca	800–1532 AD
Tunanmarka		Junín	Huanca	
Uchkus Inkañan		Huancavelica	Inca	
Ullantaytampu		Cusco	Inca	1450–1532 AD
Usnu		Ayacucho		
Vilcabamba (Espiritu Pampa)		Cusco	Inca	1539–1572 AD
Vilcashuamán		Ayacucho	Inca	1470–1532 AD
Viracochapampa		La Libertad	Wari	600–800 AD
Vitcos		Cusco	Inca	
Wamanmarka		Cusco	Inca	
Wanuku Pampa		Huánuco	Inca	1470–1532 AD
Waqramarka		Ancash		
Wari ruins		Ayacucho	Huari	500–900 AD
Wari Willka		Junín	Huanca	
Willkaraqay		Cusco	Inca	
Willkawayin		Ancash	Wari	400–1000 AD
Wiñay Wayna		Cusco	Inca	

== See also ==
- Cultural periods of Peru
- List of pre-Columbian cultures
