= Rosa Fung Pineda =

Peruvian archaeologist (1932/1935–2026)

- Fung in 1968
- Born: Rosa Eloida Fung Pineda; 1932 or 1935; Casma, Ancash, Peru
- Died: c. 6 September 2026; Lima, Peru
- Occupations: Archaeologist; professor
- Spouse: Edward P. Lanning
- Children: 2

Rosa Eloida Fung Pineda (1932 or 1935 – c. 6 September 2026) was a Peruvian archaeologist. One of the first professional female archaeologists in her country, she taught at the National University of San Marcos (UNMSM). She specialized in pre-Hispanic Andean history, especially Preceramic, Initial Period, and Early Horizon eras, and the role of maritime resources on Andean society.

Fung was named a professor emeritus at UNMSM in 1999, after her retirement.

== Education and career ==
Fung attended the National University of San Marcos (UNMSM), studying ethnology and archaeology; she graduated from UNMSM with a bachelor's degree in 1963 and a doctoral degree in 1967, with a dissertation on the Las Haldas archaeological site. She subsequently worked at the university for much of her career, teaching in their archaeology department; she also taught briefly at Arizona State University in the United States during the 1960s. She was the first tenured female archaeologist at the UNMSM Division of Social Sciences. From 1973 to 1978 she worked as the director of their Museum of Archaeology. She served as the Archaeology Program coordinator from 1981 to 1984. From 1985 to 1986, she directed the social studies graduate program.

When Fung began her career, she was one of the first professional female archaeologists in Peru. She participated in excavations led by Seiichi Izumi at Chancay in 1957 and Tumbes in 1958. She directed excavations at Las Haldas in 1963 and 1964 and Chankillo excavations in the 1960s. In th 1970s, she continued the pre-1970 Ancash earthquake work of Luis Lumbreras and Hernan Amat at Chavín de Huántar. Fung also participated in studies at Chivateros, Bermejo, Bandurria, Curayacu, and Pacopampa.

She specialized in pre-Hispanic Andean history, specifically the Preceramic, Initial Period, and Early Horizon eras. She studied the north-central coast of Peru and the role of its maritime resources on Andean society. Fung was an early advocate of the idea that Andean civilization had heavily drawn upon maritime resources, later proposed by archaeologist Michael E. Moseley as the Maritime Foundations of Andean Civilization hypothesis. She also studied textiles, believing that understanding them was important to the understanding of history. She was critical of the Peruvian government's decision to lend out their artefacts to foreign countries.

After her retirement from UNMSM, she was made a professor emeritus in 1999. The second issue of the journal Arqueología y Vida, published in 2008, was dedicated to Fung's life and career.

== Personal life and death ==
Rosa Eloida Fung Pineda was born and raised in Casma, Peru. She was born in 1932 or 1935 to parents Santiago Fung and Victoria Pineda, part of a Chinese immigrant family. In her youth, Fung moved from her hometown of Casma, in the Ancash department, to Lima to attend a secondary school there.

She was married to fellow archaeologist Edward P. Lanning; the couple had two children.

Fung's death was reported on 6 September 2026 by the Peruvian Ministry of Culture.

== Publications ==
Fung wrote many articles on archaeology as well as books, including:

- Informe de hallazgos arqueológicos en la parte baja del Valle de Lurín (1970) OCLC 2703880
- Quehaceres de la Arqueología Peruana (2004) ISBN 9972997707

She also wrote a chapter in the 1999 book Historia de América Andina, volume I, edited by Luis Guillermo Lumbreras.
