= Las Haldas =

Archaeological site in Peru

- Las Aldas
- Location within Peru
- 9°42′09″S 78°17′50″W
- Type: Settlement
- Cultures: Casma–Sechin culture
- Location: Ancash, Peru

History
- Built: c. 2200 BCE
- Abandoned: c. 300 BCE

Site notes
- Condition: In ruins

Las Haldas or Las Aldas is a large archaeological complex from before and during the initial ceramic period (1800–1000 BCE) of Peru. Las Haldas is located on the Pacific coast approximately 300 kilometres (190 miles) north of Lima and about 20 kilometres (12 mi) south of the Casma river valley, noted for the extensive ruins of the Casma–Sechin culture. For most of its history Las Haldas, a coastal community, coexisted with the inland agricultural communities in the Casma River Valley.

Distinguishing characteristics of Las Haldas are both its size and age as one of the earliest ruins of the ceramic period, its dependence upon maritime resources for subsistence, the lack of agriculture, and its distance from any source of fresh water.

Las Haldas is in a coastal area in which are found the oldest known civilizations of the Americas. The Casma valley archaeological sites are a few miles north and the Caral-Supe civilization is about 60 miles (97 km) to the south.

== Discovery and description ==
Las Haldas was discovered in 1956 and has since been studied by many archaeologists. It was not discovered earlier because of its unlikely location, far from sources of fresh water and land which could be irrigated for agriculture. Las Haldas is located on a terrace near but above the rocky coastline of the ocean at an elevation of about 120 feet (37 m). The area around Las Haldas is devoid of vegetation. This coastal area near receives less than 1 inch (25 mm) of precipitation annually.

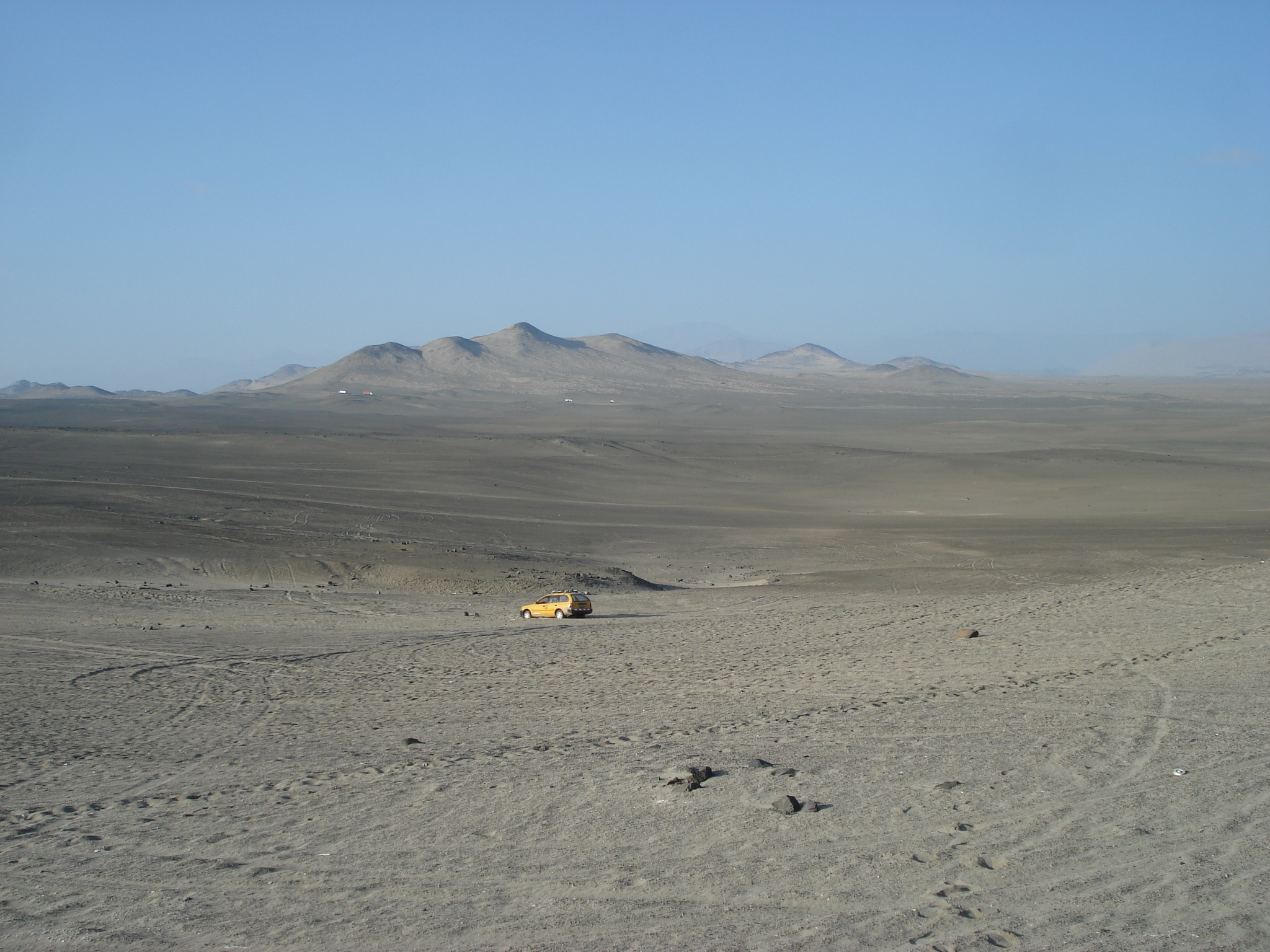
Las Haldas.

The ruins cover about 40 hectares (99 acres), consisting of a 370-meter (400 yards) long, U-shaped central area with a large mound at one end and four slightly elevated plazas. The largest of the plazas has a circular court. Around the central area are 18 additional smaller mounds, each with its plaza and one with another circular court. Residential areas are found to either side of the monumental ruins.

Las Haldas is isolated from other contemporary archaeological sites, the nearest being the inland agricultural sites in the Casma River valley 12 miles (19 km) to the north which are also the nearest source of fresh water. Throughout its history, Las Haldas probably traded maritime products to the Casma River settlements for agricultural products. Agricultural products collected at Las Haldas include cotton, beans, including lima beans, potatoes, chile peppers, and lúcuma (a tropical fruit still popular in Peru). All of these products were probably imported from the Casma River valley. Maize has not been found at Las Haldas although it was being grown at this time in Peru.

== Dating and influence ==
The ruins at Las Haldas primarily date from the Initial Ceramic Period of 1800 BCE to 1000 BCE. However, the site was occupied in the Late Pre-Ceramic Period from 3000 BCE to 1800 BCE and continued to be occupied in the Early Horizon Period of 1000 BCE to 200 BCE. Most of the monumental construction occurred during two phases, the first beginning about 2000 BCE and lasting 300 to 400 years and the second phase, relatively brief, beginning about 1400 BCE, during which time Las Haldas reached its apex as a community. Phase 2 construction appears to have been modeled on the Sechin Alto complex in the Casma River valley. In the Phase 2 period, architectural (and possibly political influence) of Las Haldas extended north to a weakening Sechin Alto and nearby coastal communities.

After 1000 BCE, Las Haldas was gradually abandoned as the importance of irrigation agriculture grew and coastal settlements became smaller and subsidiary to inland agricultural communities in river valleys.

== The maritime theory ==
It has long been an article of faith by scholars that the rise of civilization was based on intensive agriculture, particularly of at least one cereal. The production of agricultural surpluses is seen as essential in promoting population density and the emergence of complex society. Anthropologist Michael E. Moseley challenged this view in the 1970s, asserting that the earliest civilizations in Peru were based not on agriculture, but on exploitation of the rich maritime resources of the Peruvian coastline at sites such as Las Haldas which practiced little or no agriculture. Reinforcing Moseley's theory, Los Haldas, according to radiocarbon dating, appears to be older than many nearby inland agricultural sites in the Casma and Sechin Valleys.

Investigations and earlier dating of other sites, notably nearby Sechin Bajo, have called Moseley's hypothesis into question, but in 2004 he still maintained that perhaps "Peruvian fisherman can be credited for creating the earliest civilizations in the Americas."

== Water ==
Given the distance to the nearest source of drinking water, Las Haldas seems undesirable as a location for a settlement. Some anthropologists have argued that water wells must have existed near Las Haldas. The Pozorski's, a husband and wife team, argued to the contrary. Many early fishing settlements, they said, were located distant from sources of water because fish and shellfish resources are more abundant away from the fresh water near the mouths of coastal rivers. They also argued that the requirements for drinking water would be small given the mild temperatures and the water content of seafood and that much cooking could have been done with sea water. It was feasible, they claimed, for the inhabitants of Las Haldas to have hauled drinking water from the Casma Valley.

== See also ==
- Casma–Sechin culture
- Cerro Sechin
- Chankillo
- Mojeque
- Sechin Alto
- Sechin Bajo

== Bibliography ==
- SHELIA POZORSKI AND THOMAS POZORSKI (2002), The Sechin Alto Complex and Its Place Within Casma Valley Initial Period Development. in Andean Archaeology I, William H. Isbell, Helaine Silverman, eds, Springer Science & Business Media, 2002 ISBN 0306467720 doi:10.1007/978-1-4615-0639-3_2
