= Acaray =

Archaeological site in Peru

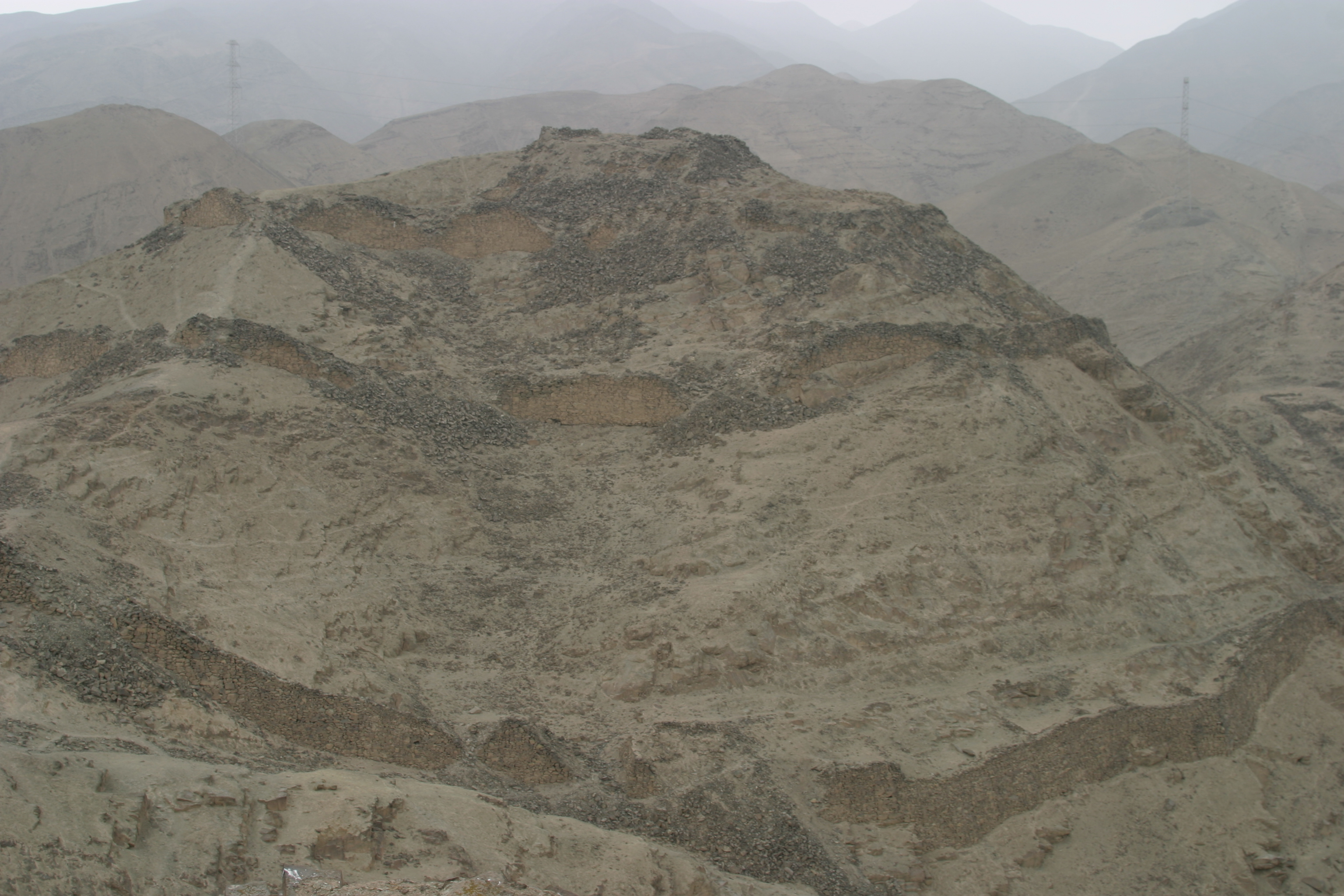
- Fortified hilltop at Acaray

- Location within Peru
- 11°03′31″S 77°31′59″W
- Type: Fortification
- Periods: Early Horizon to Late Intermediate Period
- Location: Lima Region, Peru
- Region: Norte Chico

History
- Built: 900–200 BC
- Abandoned: 1000–1470 AD

Site notes
- Area: 23 ha (57 acres)

Acaray, also known as the Fortress of Acaray, is an archaeological site located in the Huaura River Valley on the near north coast of Peru (or the Norte Chico region). The impressive fortress is located on a series of three hilltops, each ringed with a number of perimeter defensive walls that have parapets and bastions, which stand as testaments to the military nature of the site. Radio carbon dating has established it was built about 900–200 BC and abandoned 1000–1470AD. Surrounding the hilltop fortress are lower-lying areas of occupation and extensive cemeteries, which have been heavily looted.

== History of research ==
Attention was called to the site early on by the German archaeologist Hans Horkheimer, who wrote about Acaray in 1962 in the Peruvian magazine, Caretas, published in Lima. Calling it the Fortaleza de Huaura (the Fortress of Huaura), he deemed Acaray to be a true fortress, unlike the more well-known neighboring site of Paramonga in the Pativilca River Valley, whose defensive nature has been questioned. Horkheimer noted the abundance of rolled river cobbles on the surface of the site, which were likely used as projectiles or slingstones.

During the 1970s interest in Acaray increased, and the first work by archaeologists was initiated at the fortress. Peruvian archaeologist Mercédes Cárdenas, of the Riva-Agüero Institute, excavated at Acaray, among other coastal sites, as part of a larger project to understand the use of marine resources in the past on the Peruvian coast and to obtain radiocarbon dates. She led a team that surveyed the Huaura Valley and excavated at several sites, including the hilltop fort at Acaray. She estimated that it was built about 900–200 BC and abandoned 1000–1470 AD.

Around the same time, Peruvian archaeologist Arturo Ruiz Estrada, of the National University José Faustino Sánchez Carrión, and Peruvian engineer Domingo Torero visited the fortress; they wrote a detailed account describing the architectural features of the site.

In 2004, North American archaeologist Margaret Brown Vega, of the University of Illinois at Urbana-Champaign, began research at Acaray, carrying out intensive mapping, surface analysis, and excavations, which lasted for two years.

According to Brown Vega, Acaray early megalithic wall constructions may be similar to those of Chankillo from the same period.

== See also ==
- List of archaeological sites in Peru
