= Mercedes Cárdenas Martin =

Peruvian teacher, archaeologist and researcher

- Born: Mercedes Ofelia Cárdenas Martin; 24 September 1932; Trujillo, Peru
- Died: 8 October 2008 (aged 76); Lima, Peru
- Education: Pontifical Catholic University of Peru; Ricardo Palma University
- Occupation: Archaeologist

Mercedes Ofelia Cárdenas Martin (1932–2008) was a Peruvian teacher, archaeologist, researcher, and museologist who participated in the creation of the archaeology program at the Pontifical Catholic University of Peru (PUCP). Her academic career consisted of the study of archaeological excavations carried out on the Peruvian coast.

== Biography ==
Mercedes Cárdenas Martin was born in Trujillo. She completed her higher education in Lima, where she obtained a bachelor's degree in humanities from the PUCP in 1965, and a doctorate in letters in 1968. She continued her postgraduate studies at Ricardo Palma University, obtaining a master's degree in museology and cultural management in 2002.

She was a disciple of Josefina Ramos de Cox in the defense of cultural heritage, as well as a mentor and director of students and thesis writers. She is remembered as a person fully dedicated to archaeological work, and a scrupulous teacher with high standards. Her nephew José Carlos Espinoza recalled, "She was an orderly and dramatic person, but just as she was demanding, she demanded of herself."

She died in Lima on 9 October 2008, and was buried two days later at La Planicie Cemetery. Several students and colleagues attended her funeral.

== Scientific career ==
Cárdenas is recognized for her pioneering work in Peruvian archaeology. She carried this out under the direction of Josefina Ramos de Cox at the Riva-Agüero Institute Archaeology Seminar (SAIRA), which took place in the huacas of Tres Palos, Pando, Palomino, at La Tablada de Lurín, in Santa Eulalia, and in Ica. She directed this seminar during the 1960s and 1980s. From 1975 to 1978 she directed the project "Obtaining a Chronology of the Use of Marine Resources in Antiquity" with the sponsorship of the West German Volkswagen Foundation, implementing a laboratory for carbon-14 dating at the PUCP campus. She also carried out excavations and studies in the Norte Chico region. According to archaeologist Rafael Vega Centeno,

Mercedes Cárdenas dedicated a large part of her life to the study of the cultures of Norte Chico, in particular the Huaura area, where in 1977 she made a valuable inventory of archaeological sites. Her pioneering work in difficult-to-explore areas, such as the Illescas Massif and the Chao Valley, also carried out during that time, should also be mentioned. Mercedes Cárdenas never balked at the need to travel through desert territories to record archaeological sites located where other colleagues had not yet arrived.

From 1980 to 1985, she was in charge of scientific and administrative coordination of the Cerro Sechín Archaeological Project, which she co-directed with Lorenzo Samaniego, based on an agreement between the PUCP and the National Institute of Culture (INC), with the sponsorship of the Volkswagen Foundation. This project has been recognized as a milestone toward the founding of the archaeology degree program at PUCP, as it was the prelude to the training of a generation of archaeologists from that university and the School of Archaeology at the National University of Trujillo.

In 1982, she co-founded the archaeology specialty at the PUCP's Faculty of Letters and Human Sciences.

Cárdenas was also active in museum management. The Sechín project that she co-directed gave rise to the creation of the Max Uhle Museum in Casma Province, Ancash. For her, it was important that archaeology be involved with the communities in which the research was carried out in order to show the local population that this contributed to the understanding of their past, present, and future.

In 1992, she participated in the symposium "The City in America", organized by the University of Piura, in which she presented her work "Notes on the Pre-Hispanic Settlement Pattern in the Chao Valley". During Cultural Identity Week, organized by the INC, with the presentation "The Illescas Massif in the Cultural Tradition of the Northern Coast of Peru". She also carried out important archaeological research in the Rímac Valley, as a result of which she presented a paper at the 1st Colloquium of the Rímac Valley (Late Intermediate) in 1998.

== Teaching ==
Cárdenas began teaching archaeology at the PUCP, where she served as a senior lecturer in the courses of Peruvian Archaeology I, II, III and IV. She taught at this university for 25 years, thus training several generations of archaeologists, including Walter Alva.

...her teaching work was not restricted to the classroom. Mercedes Cárdenas expressed a constant concern for the growth of her students and, in times of few bibliographic resources, she generously offered access to her library (the best in archaeology in Lima, at the time) and, in certain cases, supported obtaining research authorizations, and even the management of logistical resources for them...

== Awards and recognition ==
In April 2009, the Riva-Agüero Institute held the posthumous tribute "Colloquium on Peruvian Archaeology: Tribute to Mercedes Cárdenas".

In 2011, the discussions at the colloquium were compiled into the book Peruvian Archaeology: Tribute to Mercedes Cárdenas, in which José De La Puente Brunke, director of the Riva-Agüero Institute, highlights the best of her work:

Mercedes Cárdenas is a notable figure in the history of our Riva-Agüero Institute. A dedicated and hard-working woman, she put all her enthusiasm into the creation of our Archaeology Museum and into the dissemination of the teaching of Peruvian history through the Institute's various publications. The challenge we have today is to maintain and increase the validity of the Riva-Agüero Institute as a research center in Humanities, with the seriousness and commitment that Mercedes Cárdenas always demonstrated.

She was named a "Meritorious Personality of Culture" by the Ministry of Culture on 18 May 2018 in recognition of her important archaeological research, her work in museum management, and her work in the conservation of real estate in the Cultural Heritage of the Nation.
