= Sechin Alto =

Archaeological site in Peru

Coordinates: 9.4654°S 78.2426°W

Sechin Alto is a massive architectural complex in Peru belonging to the Early Formative period (2000-1500 BC). It is located in the Casma Province, the Ancash Region, on the left bank of the Sechín River, east of the town of the same name. Other important archaeological sites such as Cerro Sechin and Sechin Bajo are located nearby.

== Studies ==
Archaeologist Julio C. Tello was the first to make a thorough description of this archaeological site during his visit to the valley of Casma in 1937. He determined that this was the largest architectural structure not only in Peru, but in all of the Americas. The site was later studied by archaeologists Rosa Fung Pineda and Carlos Williams (1979), and by Thomas and Shelia Pozorski (1987).

== Description ==
The main structure, called "Templo", has a pyramidal shape. It measures 350m by 300m, and reaches the height of 35m. It consists of raised embankments and walls with large stones alternating with smaller ones; conical adobe bricks are seen in the interior. In front of the "Templo" extend five courts or plazas, some with sunken circular courts; this indicates the ceremonial character of the whole complex. The complex is oriented to the northwest, and its length is about 2 km.

Around this complex, numerous smaller structures – all oriented along the main axes – are distributed. Currently, these areas are used for agriculture, so they have not yet been studied. The whole of Sechin Alto complex covers the area of 300-400 hectares, or five times the size of Caral, one of the largest Archaic sites in Peru.

Because of its size, this may have been the administrative center of the whole Sechin cultural area.

== Related sites ==
This area represents the confluence of Sechin and Casma rivers, and there are several other important sites here. In front of Sechin Alto, on the other side of Sechin River, is the complex of Sechin Bajo with its ancient occupation going back to 3,500 BC.

The more famous nearby site is called Cerro Sechin, located southwest along the same bank of Sechin River. It is known for its high stone walls with reliefs depicting "warrior-priests" with their mutilated enemies; this architectural complex dates back to 1,500-2,000 BC. The stone reliefs belong to the latest construction phase.

Sechin Alto is the largest of the four main sites in this area. According to S. Pozorski, the other three big sites, Taukachi-Konkan, Sechin Bajo, and Cerro Sechin, feature numerous similarities, and may have been constructed at the same time,

"Critical to the definition of the Sechin Alto Complex were the consistent orientation and similarity in mound form and site layout of Sechin Alto site, Taukachi-Konkan, and Sechin Bajo. Cerro Sechin was included based on its physical proximity to the other sites and its conical adobe constructions which suggested contemporaneity with the other sites. The component sites of Sechin Alto, Taukachi Konkan, Sechin Bajo, and Cerro Sechin were assumed to be coexistent and in continuous interaction, forming an immense settlement that occupied much of the floodplain in the northern Sechin Branch of the Casma River during the Initial Period (2150—1000 BC)."

=== Political organization ===
According to the Pozorskis, the earliest cultural phase in this area may be described as the Moxeke (Mojeque) Phase. This was during the early Initial Period. After this, there was the Sechin Phase.

"Preliminary data suggesting connections among Sechin Alto Complex sites, Pampa de las Llamas-Moxeke in the south branch, and certain coastal sites north of the Casma River mouth indicate that the greater Casma Valley area was unified during the early Initial Period by the Moxeke polity which existed during a time span defined here as the Moxeke Phase. Near the end of the Initial Period, during the time span labeled here as the Sechin Phase, political power became centralized by the Sechin polity within the Sechin branch as Pampa de las Llamas Moxeke ceased to be occupied; and the coastal site of Las Haldas, which had long existed in isolation, was incorporated as a major satellite of Sechin Alto Complex sites."

== See also ==
- Casma/Sechin culture
- Cultural periods of Peru
- Ancient Peru
- Andean preceramic
