= Mojeque =

Archaeological site in Peru

Coordinates: 9.507°S 78.226°W

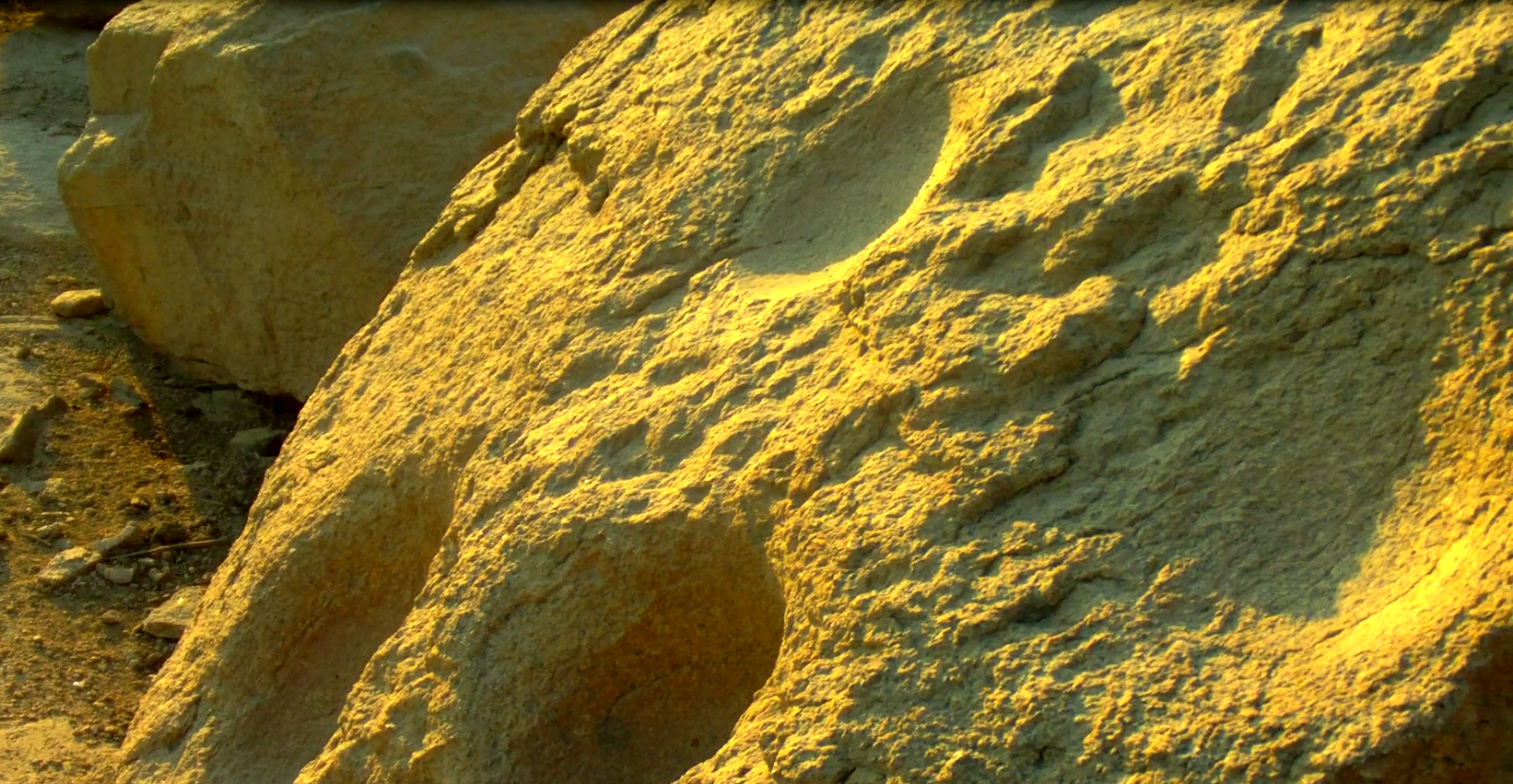
Mojeque site in the Casma Valley

Mojeque, or Pampa de las Llamas-Moxeke, is a large archaeological site located in the Casma Province of Ancash Region in northern Peru. Archaeologists believe it functioned as a temple or religious structure. It contains two large mounds, many smaller mounds, and multiple human figures and heads believed to depict deities or divine rulers. Large crowds would gather at this site to observe and participate in rituals or ceremonies associated with the mounds. It is only one of the large sites of the Casma/Sechin culture in the Casma and Sechin River valleys. The others are Cerro Sechin, Sechin Alto, and Sechin Bajo. The Sechin River is a tributary of the Casma River.

== History of research ==
The site was first investigated by Peruvian archaeologist Julio C. Tello. His student Toribio Mejia Xesspe discovered large polychrome figures at Mojeque which are a striking feature of the complex. The images include the picture of the "Weeping God", found also at other Andean sites.

The complex was thought originally to belong to the Chavin culture.

American archaeologists Thomas and Sheila Pozorski studied the site in the 1980s. They placed its construction in the "Initial period", 1800 BC to 900 BC (i.e. before Chavin). The Pozorskis also saw that the site links with the neighboring Pampa de las Llamas complex.

== Mounds ==
There are two very large pyramid-shaped mounds: "Moxeke" and "Huaca A", 1.3 km apart. They are aligned precisely to N 41° E. In the vicinity, there are also scattered more than 100 small mound structures aligned with the main mounds. The whole site covers about 2 km^{2}.

The site also contains the remains of many other buildings, including the administrative buildings, and groups of residences of different sizes.

Moxeke, the main mound, is a stepped pyramid containing at least six platforms. It was about 30 m in height, and almost quadrangular: about 160 by 170 m. It was built from megalithic stones, also using conical adobe bricks.

The Pozorskis also found some evidence that there was still earlier construction on the site.

== Bibliography ==
- Sheila Pozorski, Thomas Pozorski, Recent Excavation at Pampa de las Llamas-Moxeke, a Complex Initial Period Site in Peru, Journal of Field Archaeology, 13, n.4, 1986
- Richard Burger, Chavin and the Origins of Andean Civilization, Thames and Hudson, 1992
