= Arturo Jiménez Borja =

Peruvian physician and historian

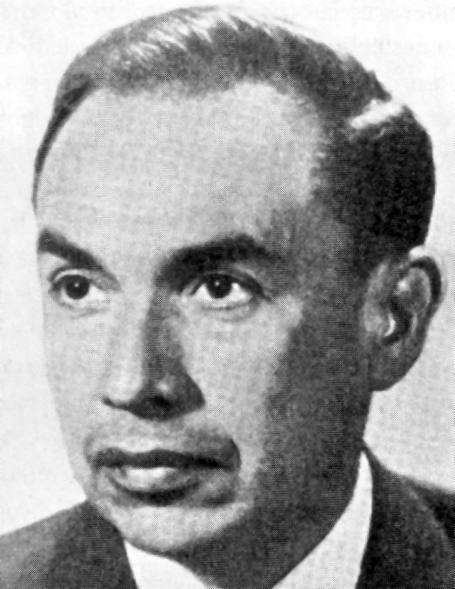
Arturo Jiménez Borja (1908–2000)

Arturo Jiménez Borja (1908–2000) was a Peruvian physician, ethnologist, painter and writer. He was born in Tacna on July 21, 1908, and died in Lima on January 13, 2000. He was a first order descendant of the last indigenous curaca in Tacna, Toribio Ara.

== Biography ==
Jiménez attained the title of doctor-surgeon in 1943 at the Universidad Nacional Mayor de San Marcos, heading the departments of Therapeutics and Endocrinology at the Faculty of Medicine, San Fernando.

He devoted his studies to indigenous clothing, masks and musical instruments. He achieved the restoration of ancient monuments in areas such as Puruchuco, Pachacamac and Paramonga, building a museum in each of them. He was director of the museum site of Pachacamac (1956) and Director of the National Museum.

Jiménez Borja worked alongside Lorenzo Samaniego at the Cerro Sechín site between 1969-1974.

He donated his collection of musical instruments from Peru to the Universidad Nacional Mayor de San Marcos. His collection of masks from all over Peru, the most comprehensive and most valuable, admired by friends and strangers, can now be seen very well maintained, in the Museum of Arts and Traditions of the Riva Aguero Institute at the Catholic Pontifical University in Peru.

He was murdered on January 13, 2000, in Lima.

== Works ==
Jiménez published many works on ethnology, plus his work recounting Peruvian stories and legends.

- Cuentos peruanos (1937) - Peruvian Tales
- Leyendas del Perú (1941) - Legends of Peru
- La creación del mundo (1962) - The creation of the world
- Los toquis según Guamán Poma de Ayala (1941) - The toquis according to Guamán Poma de Ayala
- Moche (1938)
- Mate peruano (1948) - Peruvian Mate
- Instrumentos musicales del Perú (1951) - Musical Instruments of Peru
- La comida en el antiguo Perú y Puruchuco (1977) - Food in ancient Peru and Puruchuco
- Máscaras Peruanas, Banco Continental, Lima, 1996. - Peruvian masks
- Vestidos Populares Peruanos, Banco Continental, Lima, 1998. - Popular Peruvian dresses

== Awards and recognition ==
- Rousell Prize for Medicine (1992).
