= Casma =

- Town
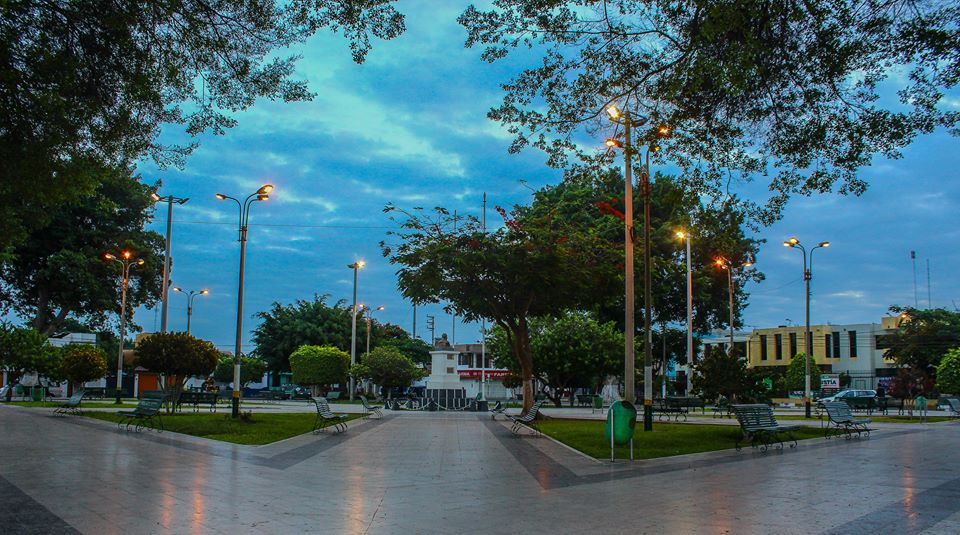
- Nickname: Tierra del Eterno Sol (Land of the Eternal Sun)
- Location within Peru
- Coordinates: 9°28′27″S 78°18′38″W
- Country: Peru
- Region: Ancash
- Province: Casma
- Elevation: 210 m (680 ft)

Population
  - Estimate (2015): 29,343
- Time zone: PET

Casma is a city in the coastal desert of Peru, located 330 kilometers (205 mi) northwest of Lima. It is the capital of the province of Casma and the third most populous city in the Ancash Region with an estimated population of 29,343 (2015). It is located in the lower Casma Valley, covering an area of 1,205 km^{2}.

The name of the city may derive from the extinct Quingman language.

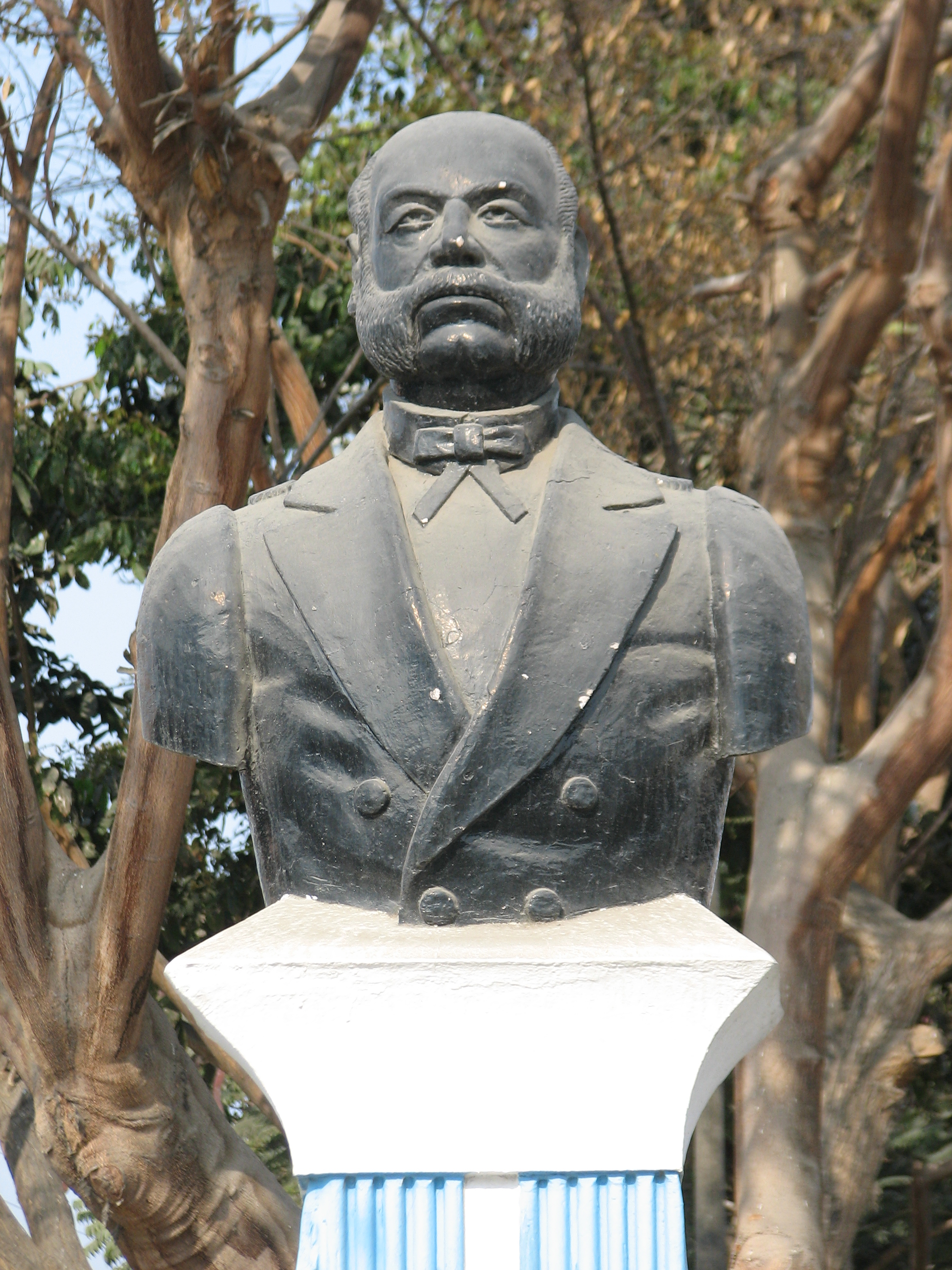
Miguel Grau statue in the main square in Casma

Santa Maria Magdalena is the city's patron saint, whose day is celebrated on 22 July.

Some of the largest prehistoric monuments around the world are situated around the city, in the Casma and Sechin valleys. These include Sechin, Chanquillo, Mojeque and Las Aldas.

The nearby Pacific coastline boasts beaches such as La Gramita, El Litro, Punta el Huaro and Tortugas.

== Archaeology ==
=== Sechin Bajo Archaeological Site ===
In February 2008, German and Peruvian archeologists working at Sechin Bajo uncovered a stone and adobe ceremonial plaza which they dated to 5,500 years ago. This makes it the oldest known monument in Peru and one of the oldest structures ever found in the Americas.

The pyramid, main square, and circular sunken courtyard complexes extend over 1 kilometer (0.62 mi) in length.

=== Chankillo Archaeological Site ===
The Thirteen Towers of Chankillo (Chanquillo) run north to south along a low ridge within a fourth-century BCE architectural complex in the Casma Valley, in northern coastal Peru.

From hypothesized observing positions within nearby buildings to the west and east, the towers form an artificial, toothed horizon that roughly spans the annual rising and setting arcs of the Sun. The Chankillo towers are interpreted as marking positions of the apparent annual solar movement along the horizon, and as evidencing Sun cults, preceding the Sun pillars of Cusco by almost two millennia.

=== Las Aldas Archaeological Site ===
Las Aldas (or Las Haldas) is located on the Pacific coast, about 20 kilometers (12 mi) south of the Casma River and dates from 1800 to 1000 BC.

The lack of fresh water source nearby has led archaeologists to surmise that the people of Las Aldas traded seafood and other maritime resources for agricultural produce with the urban centers located inland, such as those of the Casma Valley and the Norte Chico civilization to the south.

== Notes ==
1.The Thirteen Towers of Chankillo and their connection to the rising and the setting arcs of the Sun has not been proven.
