= Bandurria, Peru =

Archaeological site in Peru

Coordinates: 11.187138°S 77.588433°W

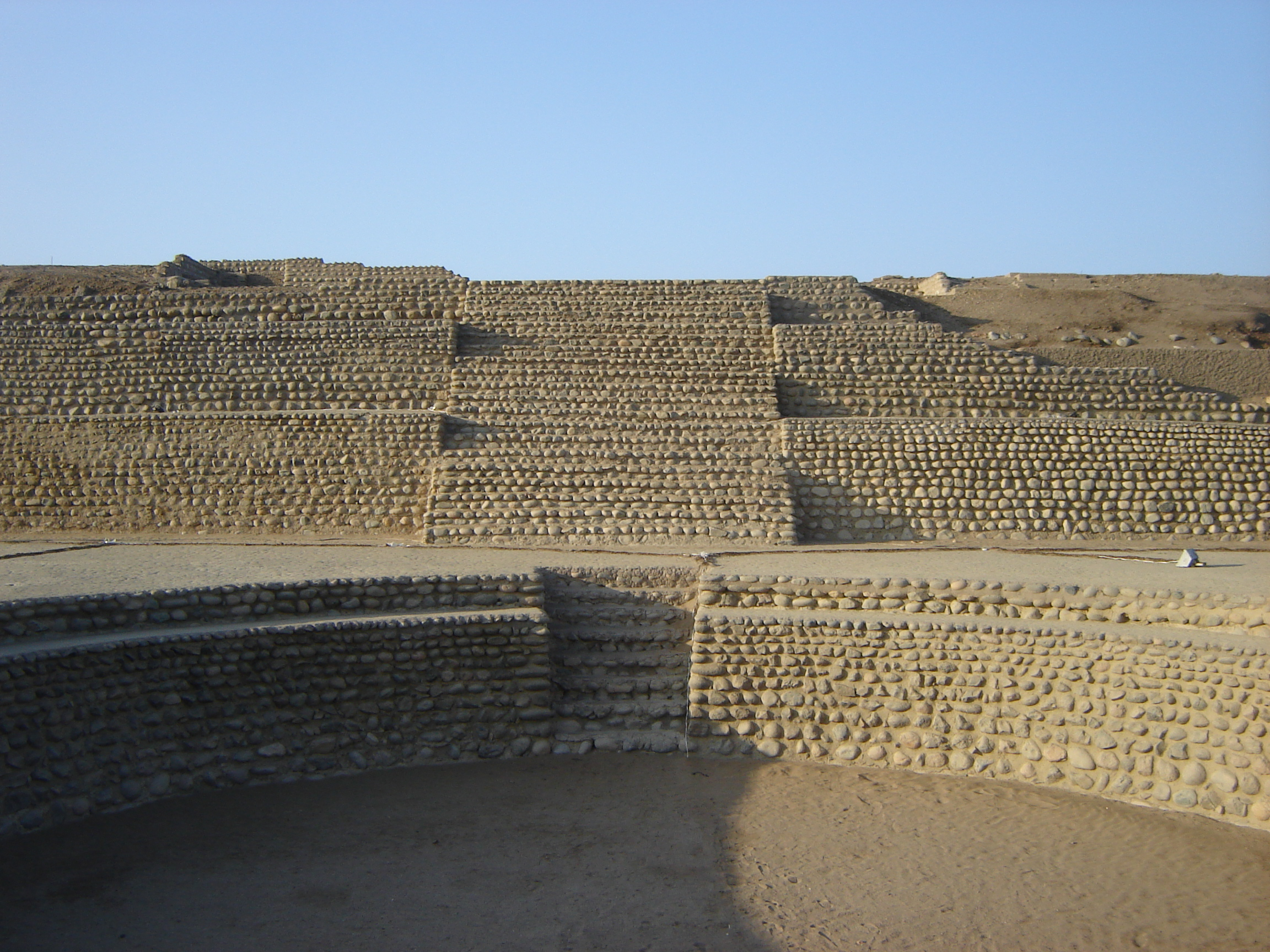
Monumental architecture at Bandurria

Bandurria is a large archaeological site on the Huaura River in Peru that has been dated to 4,000 BC. It is located about 3 km south of the city of Huacho, in Huacho District, Huaura Province, Lima Region. It corresponds chronologically to the period known as the 'Late Archaic' or 'Late preceramic' covering the years from about 4000 to 2000 BC.

== Description ==
The site is located near the Pacific coast, in the area called Playa Chica at kilometer 141 of the Panamericana Norte highway. It was discovered in 1973 by Domingo Torero Fernandez de Cordova. It occupies an area of 54 hectares and has been studied by a team led by archaeologist Alejandro Chu.

== Environment ==
Bandurria is located near the Santa Rosa irrigation project, and the nearby wetland area. Part of the archaeological site has been destroyed as a result of water infiltration when the irrigation project started in 1973. This was when the site was discovered by archeologists.

The area got its name from a species of birds present in this area, known also as buff-necked ibis.

== Research history ==
The site was investigated by Rosa Fung in 1973 and 1977. These investigations concluded that the site belongs to the Late Archaic period, from the 4th to the 3rd millennium BCE. Some of the radiocarbon dates obtained were between 2,500 and 2,300 BCE.

Bandurria represents an early coastal fishing settlement featuring the first evidence of a ceremonial stone architecture. Archaeological sites belonging to the Late Archaic period had been identified previously to the north, but Bandurria was prior to them chronologically.

In August 2005, the research work restarted on the site, more than 30 years after its discovery. The Bandurria Archaeological Project, led by Alejandro Chu, uncovered a section of a monument built with boulders and mortar. These recent excavations have uncovered the evidence of monumental architecture. They have also established that this was an urban center distinct from the monumental sites of the Norte Chico civilization, on the north central coast of Peru. This may represent the earliest evidence of urbanism in this larger coastal area.

The site is divided into two distinct sectors. The area featuring domestic occupation is the largest. Most of this area was destroyed by an irrigation project that began in 1973.

The sector featuring monumental architecture was first thought to be a natural formation made up of low rocky hills. However, a thorough review of the surface and surroundings of these hills revealed at least 4 major mounds, to which other smaller mounds were associated.

== Recent developments ==
In 2007, additional radio-carbon dates were obtained. According to Alejandro Chu Barrera, the director of the Archaeological Project of Bandurria, the site is now dated to 3200 BCE. This is older than Caral, the more famous site of the Norte Chico civilization in the River Supe Valley to the north. Caral has previously been described as 'the oldest city in the New World'. Caral is located 33 km northeast of Bandurria.

Bandurria has architecture similar to that of Caral and several other sites in the Supe Valley, featuring a sunken circular plaza and stairways. There are also other related structures constructed in a symmetrical pattern.

There are also other coastal sites in Peru that have been dated very early as the result of recent excavations. They include Sechin Bajo, with the oldest radiocarbon dates of 3600 BCE, and Huaricanga, dated to about 3500 BCE.

== Current conditions ==
Bandurria has been subject to systematic destruction, which began when the nearby irrigation project started in 1973. Since it was visited in 2002 for the first time, the archaeological site has been invaded by squatters, who built shacks on the mound.

Subsequently, the Directorate General of Archaeological Heritage of the Peruvian National Institute of Culture has tried to protect the archaeological site. The regional government has also been supportive. Students from the Faculty of Management and Tourism of the Jose Faustino Sanchez Carrion National University of Huacho have also contributed to the preservation efforts.

== See also ==
- Caral
- Caral civilization
- Andean preceramic

== Bibliography ==
- Cárdenas, Mercedes (1977). Informe Preliminar del Trabajo de Campo en el valle de Huaura, Departamento de Lima. Instituto Riva-Agüero (Report). Seminario de Arqueología. Pontificia Universidad Católica del Perú.
- Cárdenas, Mercedes (1977–1978). "Sitios arqueológicos en la Playa Chica – Huacho (valle de Huaura)". Boletín del Seminario de Arqueología (19–20): 111–126.
- Chu, Alejandro (2006). "La Aldea Precolombina de Bandurria, Huacho, Perú". Escuela de Antropología. Boletín del Área de Arqueología. Apachita. 5. Quito, Ecuador: Pontificia Universidad Católica del Ecuador: 7–8.
- Chu, Alejandro (2008). La Arquitectura monumental de Bandurria (Report). Boletín de Arqueología. Vol. 10. Pontificia Universidad Católica del Perú.
- Chu, Alejandro (2008). Bandurria: Arena, Mar y Humedal en el Surgimiento de la Civilización Andina (Report). Ediciones del Proyecto Arqueológico Bandurria, Huacho. Huacho, Peru.
- Fung, Rosa (1988). "Late Preceramic and Initial Period". In Keatinge, R.W. (ed.). Peruvian Prehistory. Cambridge, UK: Cambridge University Press. pp. 67–96.
