= Sechin Bajo =

Archaeological site in Peru

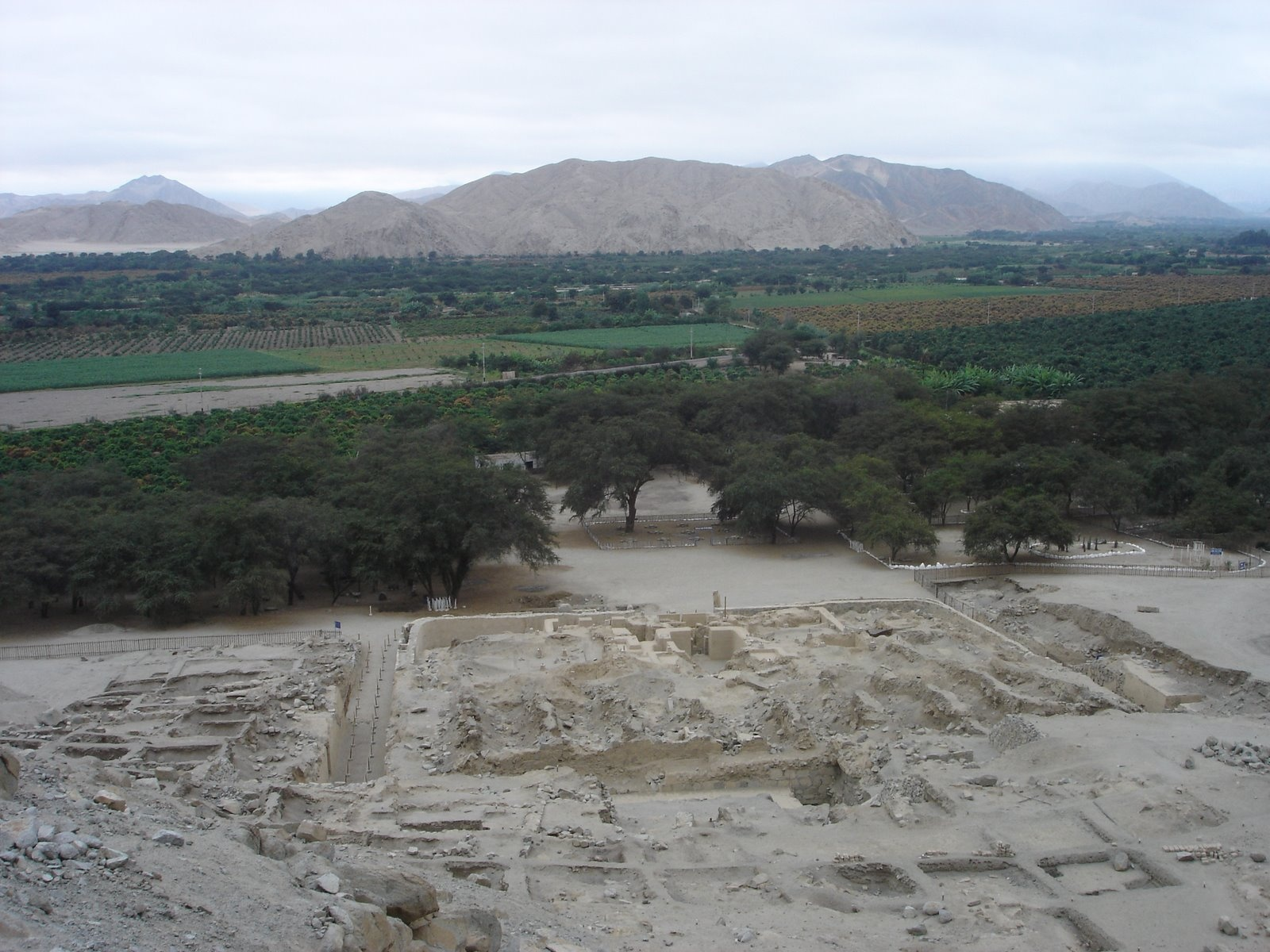
- Archaeological site of Sechin Bajo overlooking the Sechin River Valley.

- Location within Peru
- 9°27′53″S 78°15′54″W
- Type: Settlement
- Cultures: Casma/Sechin culture
- Location: Ancash, Peru

History
- Built: c. 3500 BCE; 5526 years years ago
- Abandoned: c. 1000 BCE

Site notes
- Condition: In ruins

Sechin Bajo plaza is a large archaeological site with ruins dating from 3500 BCE to 1300 BCE, making it not only one of the oldest centers of civilization in the Western Hemisphere, but also one of the oldest civilization centers on earth. Sechin Bajo is located in the valley of the Sechin River, about 12 kilometres (7.5 mi) from the Pacific Ocean and about 330 kilometres (210 mi) northwest of Lima, Peru. Sechin Bajo is one ruin among many located in close proximity to each other in the valleys of the Casma and Sechin Rivers.

In 2008, a German and Peruvian archaeological team, headed by Peter Fuchs, announced that a circular plaza, 10–12 meters (11–13 yd) in diameter and constructed of rocks and rectangular adobe bricks had been found at Sechin Bajo. Radiocarbon dating indicated that plaza was constructed in 3500 BCE. A nearby 2-meter-tall (6.6 ft) frieze was dated at 3600 BCE. The plaza and the frieze are the two oldest examples of monumental architecture discovered thus far in the Americas. Sechin Bajo may contend with sites of the Norte Chico/Caral–Supe civilization, most notably the Sacred City of Caral-Supe as the oldest urban settlement of the Americas.

== Environment ==
The Peruvian Pacific coast is one of the driest deserts in the world with average annual precipitation of less than 10 millimetres (0.39 in). Along the 1,300 kilometres (810 mi) of Peruvian coast, 57 small rivers flow into the sea, watered by the higher precipitation received in the Andes Mountains inland at elevations higher than 2,500 metres (8,200 ft). Each river valley forms a linear oasis in which irrigated agriculture is possible. The valley of the Casma River and its tributary, the Sechin River, are one of the linear oases. The ancient area of the Casma/Sechin culture extends about 40 kilometres (25 mi) inland from the sea. The width of the irrigable valleys range from one to seven kilometres (0.6 to 4.3 mi).

Located along about 4 kilometres (2.5 mi) in the Sechin River valley, just upstream from its junction with the Casma, is a complex of archaeological ruins that includes sites such as Sechin Bajo, Sechin Alto, Cerro Sechin, and Taukachi-Konkan, all of them except Sechin Alto in the desert just beyond the edge of the irrigated river valley. The Casma valley was populated long before the monumental construction began. The oldest radio carbon date found at Sechin Bajo is 4500 BCE although other signs of human occupation of the Casma valley date back to before 6,000 BCE.

Sechin Bajo is located about 130 kilometres (81 mi) north of the Norte Chico civilization, believed to be the oldest in the Americas. Given the short distances contact and transmission of cultural traits between the two areas was likely.

== Description ==
The ruins of Sechin Bajo cover an area of about 37 hectares (91 acres). The ceremonial center of the ruin consists of three monumental constructions dating from different times. The "First Edifice" or "First Building" is the oldest, initially consisting of a platform 16 metres (52 ft) square built of rocks and adobe brick and raised 2 meters over sunken circular plazas. The sunken circular plaza feature was maintained throughout. In one iteration, calibrated radiocarbon dating of the First Building ranges from as early as 3700 BCE and as late as 2900 BCE during the pre-ceramic (prior to the use of pottery) period of Peruvian archaeology. The First Building was reconstructed on five occasions during that time period with plazas and staircases being constructed, filled in, and reconstructed on multiple occasions.

The oldest of the sunken plazas was radio carbon dated at 3500 BCE in 2008. An adobe frieze was dated at 3600 BCE. The frieze, 2 metres (6.6 ft) tall, is of a man holding something in one hand and something else in the other. What he is holding has been interpreted as a ritual knife or a ceremonial cane in one hand and a human head or a shield in the other hand.

The "Second Building" and the "Third Building" were constructed much later, on top of the First Building and to cover a much larger area. They date from approximately 1600 BCE to 1200 BCE. The Third Building is the most monumental with both public squares and private areas and with many walls decorated with relief carvings. After the three buildings on the site were abandoned, they were used as a graveyard up until the fifteenth century CE. The construction of the Second and Third Buildings was oriented toward Cerro Sechin, 2 kilometres (1.2 mi) distant on the other side of the Sechin Valley. That indicates cooperation (or subordination) among the builders of the two sites.

The husband-and-wife archaeological team of the Pozorskis have speculated that Sechin Bajo and other Casma/Sechin cities and ceremonial centers were conquered about 1000 BCE by invaders from the highlands. The purported invaders introduced maize, domesticated animals, warlike carvings, and different styles of ceramics and architecture.

== Importance ==
The oldest radiocarbon dates (3600 BCE) of Sechin Bajo, if confirmed by additional investigations, may establish it as oldest site of monumental construction yet found in the Americas. This may mean that Sechin Bajo in the Casma and Sechin valleys may claim to be the oldest urban site in the Americas. That distinction in the early 21st century is held by the Norte Chico civilization of which the oldest ruins are dated at about 3500 BCE at Huaricanga, 130 kilometres (81 mi) south of Sechin Bajo. Another relevant ancient site is Bandurria, Peru in the River Huaura valley, with radio-carbon dates of 3200 BC.

Other important findings include confirmation that the Casma and Sechin valleys were probably occupied c.4500 BCE by a stable and sedentary or semi-sedentary population which eventually produced the monumental architecture found at Sechin Bajo. The date at which agriculture became the most important source of subsistence of the people of the valleys is uncertain.

The findings at Sechin Bajo appear to contradict the theory of anthropologist Michael E. Moseley and others that the earliest civilizations in Peru were based not on agriculture, but on exploitation of the rich maritime resources of the Peruvian coastline at sites such as Las Haldas which practiced little or no agriculture. The oldest radiocarbon dates for Las Haldas, about 20 kilometres (12 mi) from Sechin Bajo, are about 2400 BCE.

== See also ==
- List of the oldest buildings in the world
- List of oldest buildings in the Americas
- Cerro Sechín
