= Casma–Sechin culture =

Archaeological sites in Ancash, Peru

- Location within Peru
- 9°27′53″S 78°15′54″W
- Type: Multiple ruins in the valleys of the Casma and Sechin Rivers and on the nearby coast.
- Cultures: Casma/Sechin culture
- Location: Ancash, Peru

History
- Built: c. 3500 BCE
- Abandoned: c. 200

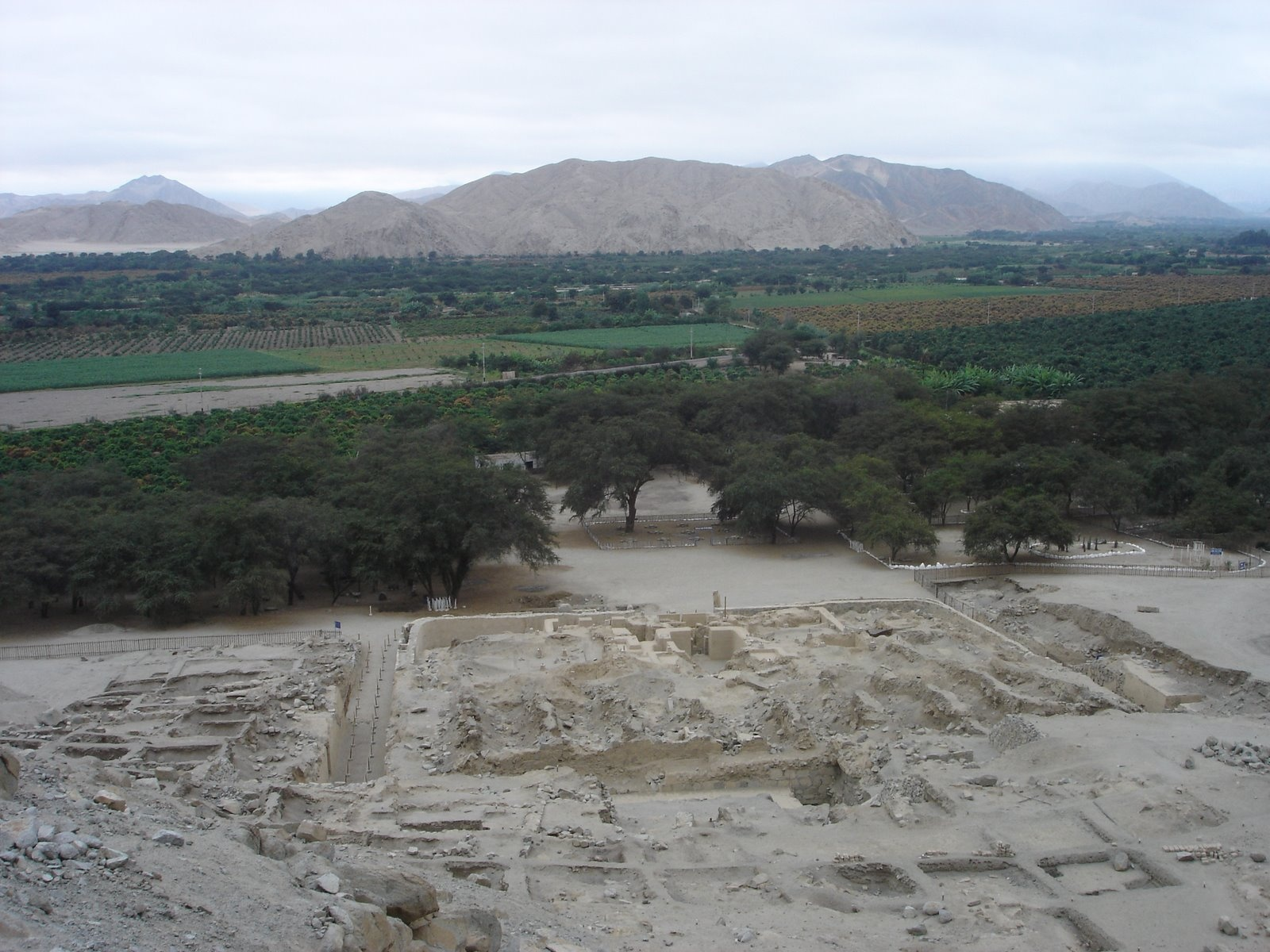
Archaeological site of Sechin Bajo overlooking the Sechin River Valley. The oldest part of the ruin, dating to 3500 BC, is on the left of the photo.

The Casma–Sechin culture (alternatively Sechin Complex) (c. 3600 BCE–200 BCE) of Peru refers to the large concentration of pre-historic ruins in the valleys of the Casma River and its tributary the Sechin River and along the nearby coast of the Pacific Ocean. The ruins include major archaeological sites such as Sechin Bajo, Sechin Alto, Cerro Sechin, Mojeque (Pampa de las Llamas-Moxeke), Chankillo, and Taukachi-Konkan, as well as other smaller sites. Most of these inland sites are found in the river valleys about 20 kilometres (12 miles) distant from the ocean. The seaside sites of Huaynuná and Las Haldas are found about 20 kilometres (12 miles) north and south of the mouth of the Casma River on the coast.

A frieze located at Sechin Bajo dated at 3600 BCE is the oldest example of monumental architecture discovered thus far in the Americas. This date, if confirmed by additional discoveries, means that the Casma/Sechin culture may have originated as early or earlier than the Caral–Supe civilization, currently considered the oldest civilization of the Americas.

== Environment ==
The Peruvian Pacific coast is one of the driest deserts in the world with average annual precipitation of less than 10 millimetres (0.39 in). Except in the river valleys the desert is nearly devoid of vegetation. Along the 2,400 kilometres (1,500 mi) of Peruvian coast, 57 small rivers flow into the sea, watered by the higher precipitation received in the Andes Mountains inland at elevations higher than 2,500 metres (8,200 ft). Each river valley forms a linear oasis in which irrigated agriculture is possible. The valleys of the Casma River and its tributary, the Sechin River, are one of the linear oases. The area of the Casma/Sechin culture extended about 40 kilometres (25 mi) inland from the sea. The width of the irrigable valleys range from one to seven kilometers (0.62 to 4.35 miles).

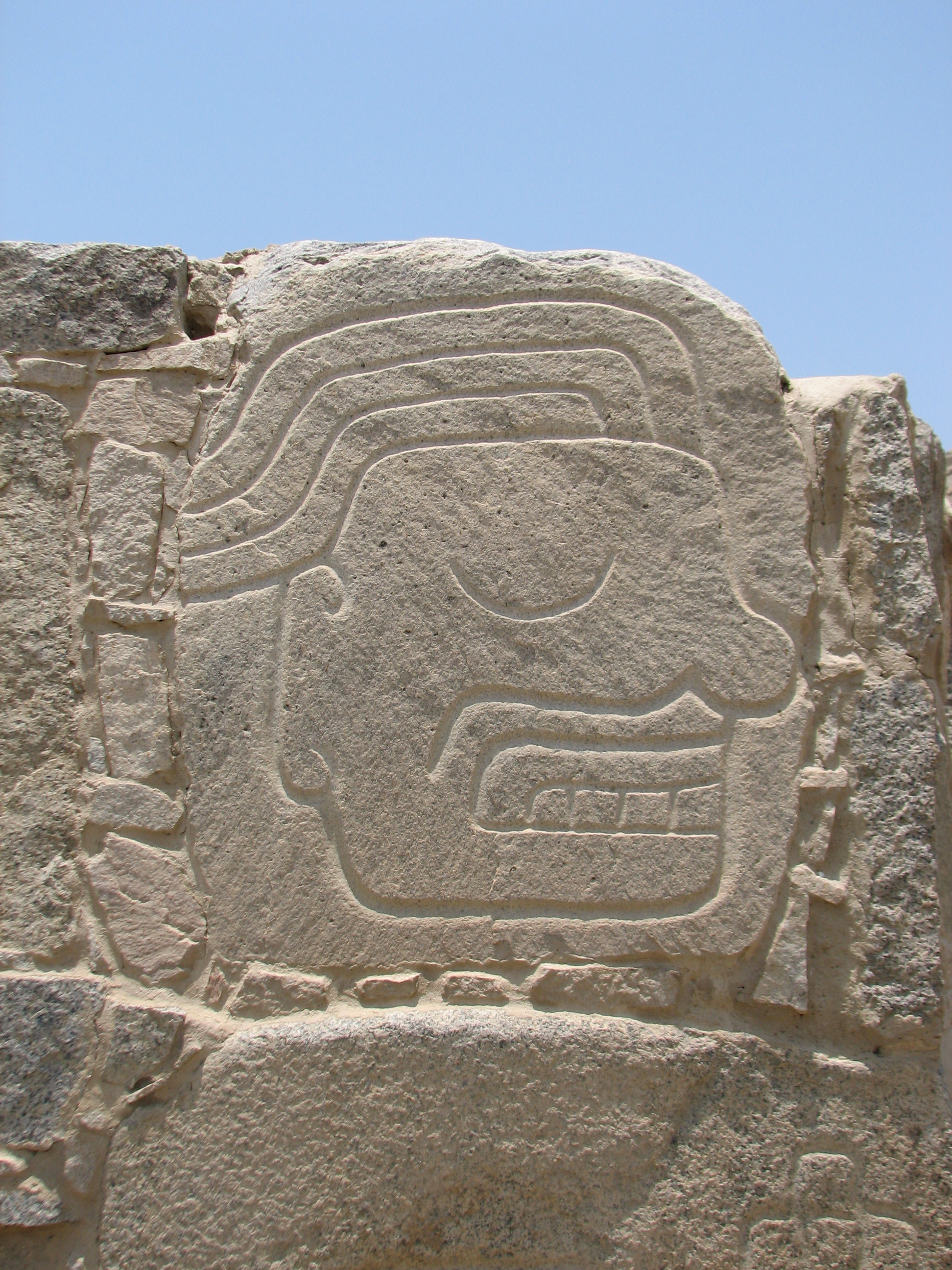
A relief carving from the Casma/Sechin culture, c. 1500 BCE.

Located along about 4 kilometres (2.5 mi) in the Sechin River valley, just upstream from its junction with the Casma, is a complex of archaeological ruins that comprises sites such as Sechin Bajo, Sechin Alto, Cerro Sechin, and Taukachi-Konkan, all of them except Sechin Alto in the desert at the edge of the irrigated river valley. Chankillo and Mojeque are located in the Casma River valley. Other smaller sites are scattered up and down the two river valleys. The Casma valley was populated long before the monumental construction at those sites began. The earliest radio carbon date indicating human habitation is 7600 BCE found at Cerro Sechin.

The Casma and Sechin river valleys have, in more recent times, supported a population of 14,000 people and perhaps the population during the height of the Casma/Sechin culture was similar. However, another estimate is that the number of people associated with the culture was 23,000. The amount of irrigable land is the narrow valleys is not large, although some population lived outside the agricultural area in the coastal sites.

The waters of the Pacific Ocean off Peru are extremely rich and some of the earliest settlements were on the desert coast and depended upon fishing rather than agriculture or hunting and gathering for subsistence. The earliest settlements also developed in the pre-ceramic era and did not use pottery.

The Casma/Sechin culture was located about 130 kilometres (81 mi) north of the northern outposts of the Norte Chico civilization, believed by archaeologists to be the oldest in the Americas. Given the short distances contact and transmission of cultural traits between the two areas was likely.

== Description ==
Coastal Peru is one of six areas of the world in which civilization developed independently without outside influences. By 3000 BC, at a few locations in coastal Peru, including the Casma/Sechin valleys, a sizable population was present and undertaking large projects such as building pyramids and other ceremonial and monumental structures. The earliest Peruvian civilization differed from the other five pristine civilizations in the world in that it lacked ceramics (pottery) in its initial stages. The importance of agriculture to early Peruvian civilization is debated with some archaeologists proposing a "maritime hypothesis" in which the rich maritime resources of the nearby Pacific Ocean enabled sedentary coastal societies to flourish before irrigated agriculture was initiated.

Some artifacts of the Casma/Sechin culture may predate the Norte Chico civilization. Radiocarbon dating indicates a plaza at Sechin Bajo was constructed in 3500 BCE. A nearby 2-meter-tall (6.6 ft) frieze was dated at 3600 BCE. The plaza and the frieze are the two oldest examples of monumental architecture discovered thus far in the Americas.

Lithic Period (12,000–3000 BCE). The earliest radio carbon dating of human occupation in the Casma/Sechin valley is near the ruin of Cerro Sechin and dates to 7600 BC. Sechin Bajo has the earliest remains discovered of monumental architecture with ruins of the "First Building" dated from 3700 BC to 2900 BC during which time multiple reconstructions of the building were undertaken. The location of Sechin Bajo inland from the sea and from marine resources suggests that agriculture had become a significant contributor to the livelihood of the builders and nearby occupants. The labor requirement for construction also implies a numerous sedentary or semi-sedentary population nearby with a mechanism of control to gather and supervise workers. Pottery was not in use during this period.

Preceramic Period (3000–1800 BCE) (2500–1800 BCE is called the Cotton Preceramic Period or Preceramic Period VI). The Preceramic Period is characterized by the growth of the coastal settlements of Huaynuná, with a settlement dated as old as 2900 BCE, and Las Haldas where a settlement is dated back to 2200 BCE. Both Huaynuná and Las Haldas are located more than 12 kilometres (7.5 mi) distant from the irrigable lands of the Casma River Valley and thus fishing was their principal means of subsistence.

Inland sites also grew during this period with the coastal settlements providing fish and other marine resources to interior settlements and the interior settlements providing agricultural products to the coastal settlements. Particularly important in this trade was cotton which was used by the coastal settlements for fishing nets and lines and gourds used for floats and containers. Floodplain agriculture seems to have been the most common means of raising crops although small-scale canal irrigation was probably also used in the Casma and Sechin valleys during this time.

Initial Period (1800–900 BCE) (Also called Formative Period). During the Initial Period, the Casma/Sechin culture achieved its most prominence. Technological developments included woven textiles and pottery, the adoption or expansion of canal irrigation for agriculture in the river valleys, and the construction of many large monumental pyramids and plazas. Many of the prominent sites of the Initial Period, such as Sechin Bajo and Cerro Sechin, date back to the Preceramic Period, but they were reconstructed and expanded during this time span.

The concentration of monumental constructions in the Sechin Valley during this period is remarkable. Within a distance of about 5 kilometres (3.1 miles) in the Sechin valley are four large ruins: Sechin Bajo, Taukachi-Konkan, Cerro Sechin, and Sechin Alto. Sechin Alto was dominant, the largest of the flat-topped pyramids characteristic of the Peruvian coast, a mound 300 by 250 metres (980 by 820 ft) in length and width and 35 metres (115 ft) in height. This was the largest construction in the Americas when it was built from about 1600 to 1400 BCE. The size, concentration, and uniformity of monuments in the Sechin valley has led archaeologists to suggest that Sechin Alto was the administrative center of a polity which united the valleys and possibly coastal sites under one government. The dominance of Sechin Alto is also suggested because of its location. All the other major sites are located in the desert at the edge of the irrigable area; Sechin Alto, in a display of conspicuous consumption, occupies scarce irrigable land.

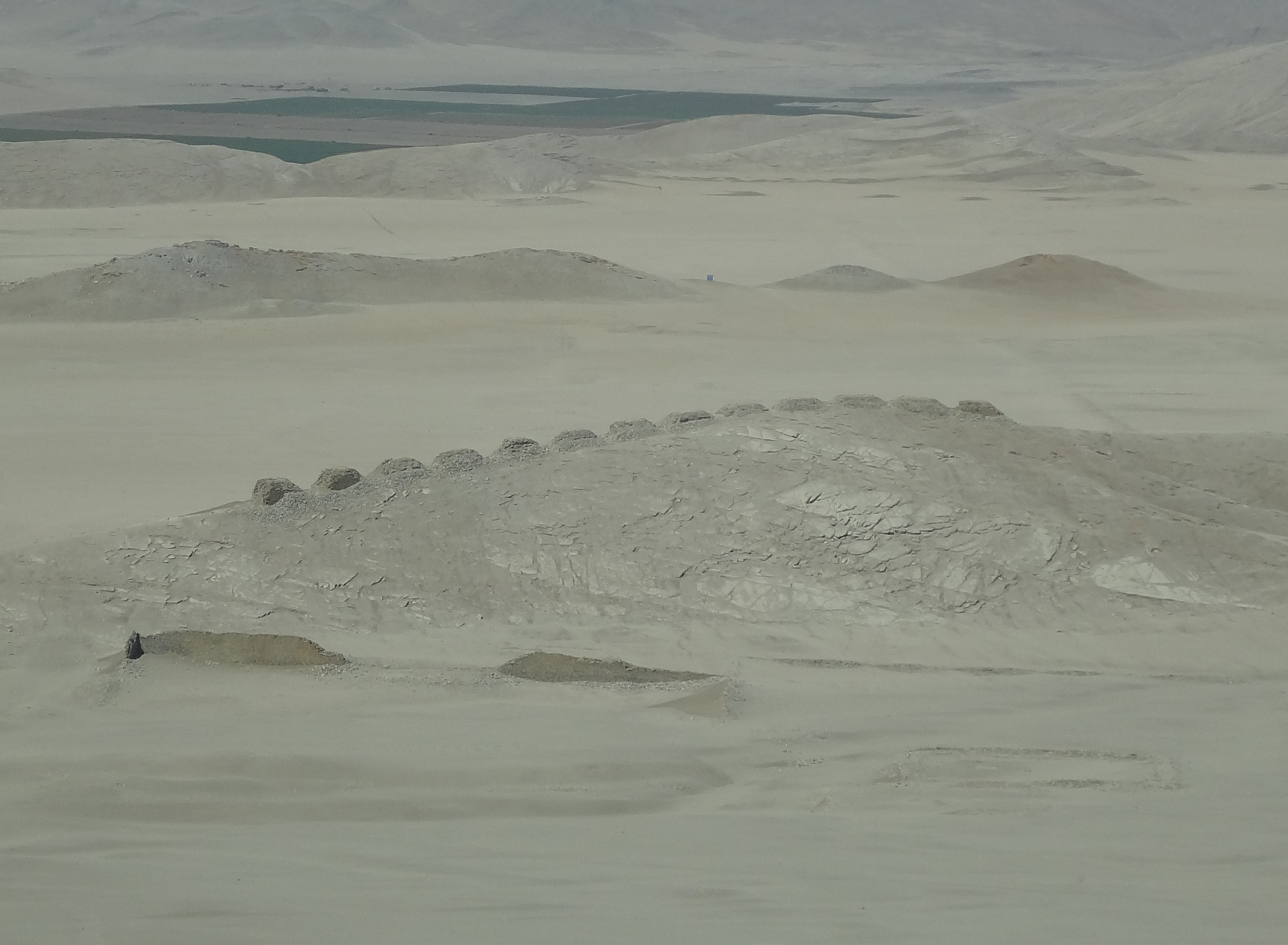
The Thirteen Towers of Chankillo, located in the desert with a modern irrigated area in the distance.

Many industrial and food plants were cultivated by the inhabitants of the Casma and Sechin Valleys, but evidence of maize, the most important crop of the Americas, is absent during the Initial Period and earlier.

Early Horizon (900–200 BCE) (Also called Formative Period). The culture of the Casma and Sechin river valleys came under the influence, and possibly the political control, of the highland Chavin culture during the Early Horizon. Near the end of the Initial Period, the character of the architecture, artifacts, and food changed in the Casma/Sechin area which implies a "hostile invasion." Maize and domestic animals, llamas, alpacas, and guinea pigs, were introduced during the Early Horizon period and the dependence upon marine resources for protein declined, suggesting that the invaders (if such there were) came from the highlands of Peru rather than other coastal cultures. Military themes were much more prominent in the new style of architecture. The large mounds characterizing Initial Period culture were no longer built.

Chankillo is one of the Early Horizon ruins of most interest. Dating from as early as 350 BCE, Chankillo incorporated a fortress, a solar observatory, and ceremonial areas. The observatory, called the Thirteen Towers of Chankillo, permitted an observer to determine a precise date of the year by observing the position of the sun at sunrise and sunset on the towers. Chankillo and other structures of the Casma/Sechin culture were partially destroyed and their use abandoned in an apparent conflict about 100 BCE.

== See also ==
- Cerro Sechin
- Chankillo
- Las Haldas
- Mojeque (Pampa de las Llamas-Moxeke)
- Sechin Alto
- Sechin Bajo
