= Sechin (surname) =

Sechin (Russian: Сечин) is a Russian masculine surname, its feminine counterpart is Sechina. Notable people with the surname include:

- Igor Sechin (born 1960), Russian politician and the CEO of Rosneft
