= Casma River =

River in Ancash region, Peru

Rio Casma
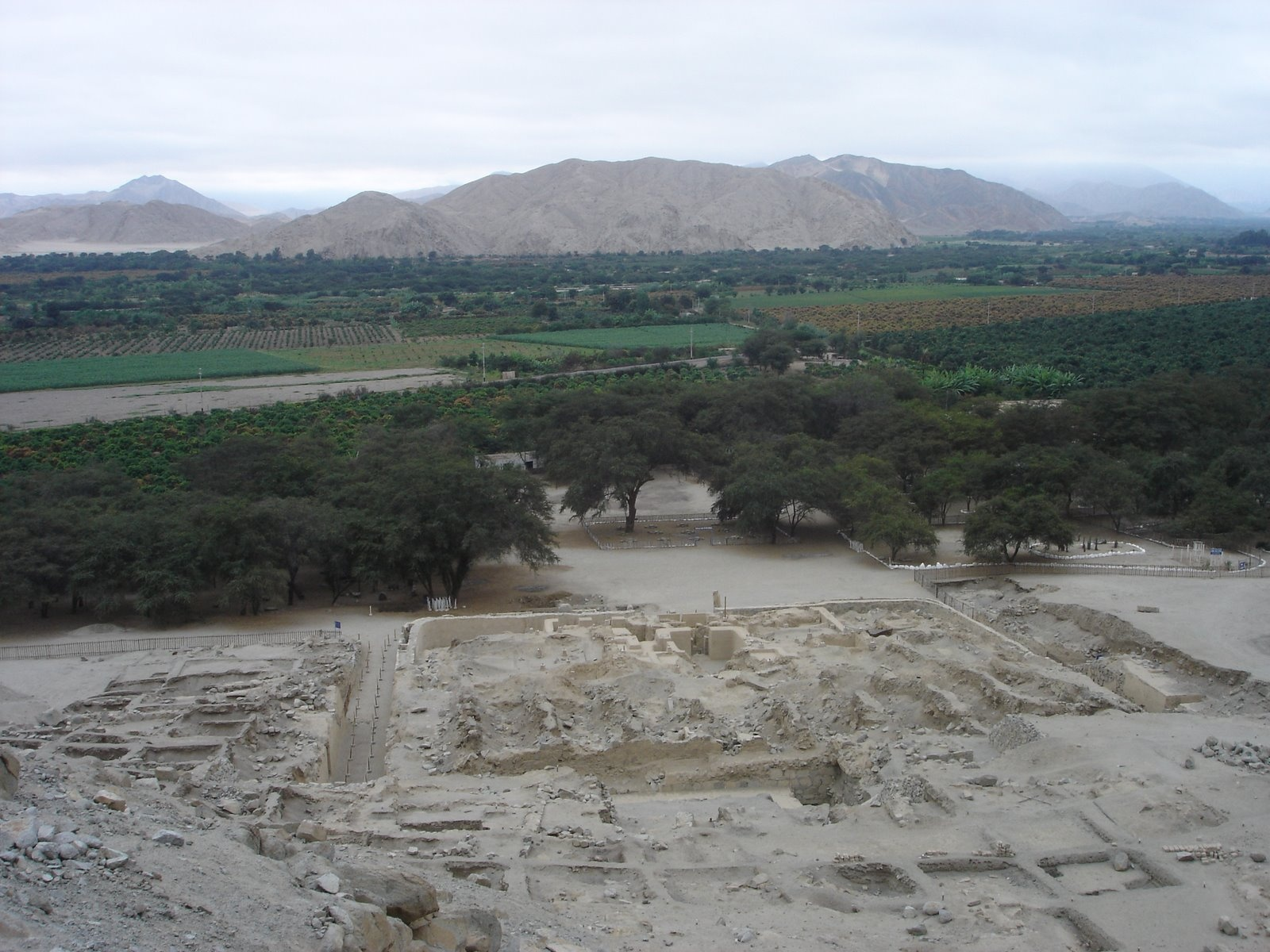
- Sechin Complex in the Casma Valley

- Location of mouth

Location
- Country: Peru
- Region: Ancash Region

Physical characteristics
- Mouth: Pacific Ocean
  - coordinates: 9°26′58″S 78°22′57″W

The Casma River, which upstream is called Río Grande, is a river that crosses northern Casma province in the Ancash Region of Peru. It originates in the Black Mountain Range and drains into the Pacific Ocean. Major tributaries include the Sechín River (right).

The valley contains the small, once important town of Casma, which had to be rebuilt after being destroyed by the 1970 Ancash earthquake. The new town has been completed.

== Economy ==
The main economic activity is agriculture. The valley produces fruits: including avocados, passionfruit, apples, mangoes, pacay, bananas, guayaba, pepino, and grapes; and other crops, including corn, cotton, asparagus, chilies, and several kinds of beans.

== Archaeology ==
The Casma Valley, a coastal valley situated about 320 kilometres (200 mi) north of Lima, Peru, lies along the Casma River, between the towns Chimbote and Huarmey. It is notable for the grand scale of numerous archaeological sites of the Casma/Sechin culture, including stone-faced pyramids and the Thirteen Towers of Chankillo. Sechín Alto is the largest American construction of the second millennium BCE. Cerro Sechin is also from the Sechin culture.

=== Huaynuná ===
(Coordinates 9.35°S 78.422°W)

The coastal pre-ceramic site of Huaynuná (Huaynuma), 13 km north of the Casma Valley, has also been investigated by archaeologists. An early, public religious tradition of architecture is represented there by a large elevated structure built on a hillside. This is a precursor to the much larger Initial Period religious mounds on the coast of Peru.

Evidence from Huaynuná, as well as the dates from other Casma Valley sites, indicate that larger-scale irrigation agriculture, use of pottery, and weaving did not appear in the Casma Valley area until about 1600 BC, some 200 years later than similar developments on the central coast of Peru.

The Casma River in Nivín, Ancash

Also, at Huaynuma, potatoes dating to about 2000 BC have been found. This is one of the earliest such discoveries in South America.

== See also ==
- Mojeque
- Sechin Bajo
