= Chanquillo =

Archaeological site in Peru

Chankillo
- Chankillo
- Chankillo
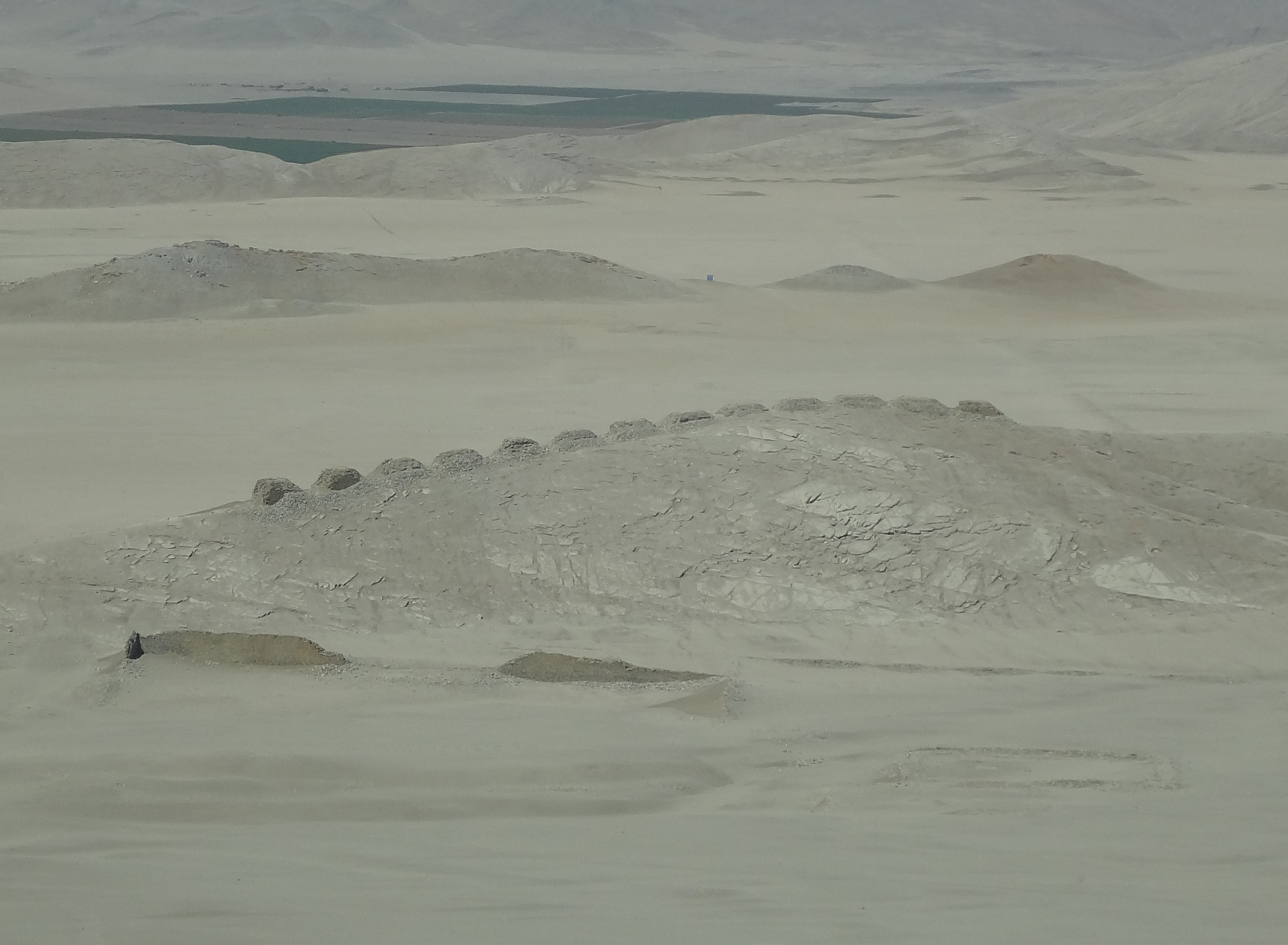
- Thirteen Towers of Chankillo, viewed from the fortress

- Location within Peru
- 09°33′24″S 78°14′09″W
- Type: Fortified sanctuary
- Location: Ancash Region, Peru
- Part of: Casma/Sechin culture

History
- Built: 250 BC

Site notes
- Area: 4 km^{2} (1.5 sq mi)
- Archaeologists: Ivan Ghezzi
- Owner: Ministry of Culture of Peru
- Management: Unidad Ejecutora Chankillo

UNESCO World Heritage Site
- Official name: Chankillo Archaeoastronomical Complex
- Criteria: Cultural: (i), (iv)
- Reference: 1624
- Inscription: 2021 (44th Session)
- Area: 4,480 ha (11,100 acres)
- Buffer zone: 43,990 ha (108,700 acres)

Chankillo is an ancient monumental complex in the Peruvian coastal desert, found in the Casma-Sechin basin in the Áncash Department of Peru. The ruins include the hilltop Chankillo fort, the nearby Thirteen Towers solar observatory, and residential and gathering areas. The Thirteen Towers have been interpreted as an astronomical observatory built in the third century BC. The culture that produced Chankillo is called the Casma/Sechin culture or the Sechin Complex. The site was awarded UNESCO World Heritage status in July 2021.

The site covers about four square kilometres (1.5 square miles) and has been interpreted as a fortified temple.

== The Thirteen Towers solar observatory ==
The regularly-spaced thirteen towers of Chankillo were constructed atop the ridge of a low hill running near north to south, forming a "toothed" horizon with narrow gaps at regular intervals. To the east and west investigators designated two possible observation points. From these vantages, the 300m long spread of the towers along the horizon corresponds very closely to the rising and setting positions of the sun over the year, albeit they are not all visible. On the winter solstice, the sun would rise behind the leftmost tower of Chankillo and rise behind each of the towers until it reached the rightmost tower six months later on the summer solstice, marking the passage of time. The Thirteen Towers of Chankillo could be the earliest known observatory in the Americas. Inhabitants of Chankillo would have been able to determine an accurate date, with an error of a day or two, by observing the sunrise or sunset from the correct tower. A contemporary site in Chincha Valley, Peru, of the late Paracas culture, which also marked the solstice, has recently been examined.

The towers had been known to travellers for 200 years but were not determined to be an astronomical site until 2007 by Iván Ghezzi and Clive Ruggles.

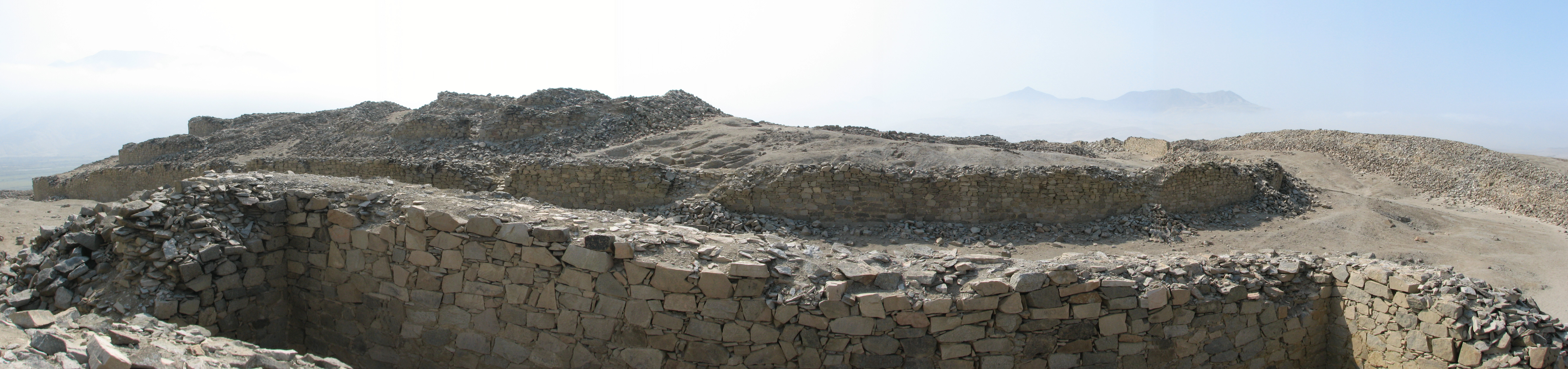
Panorama of Chankillo

== See also ==
- Acaray
- List of archaeoastronomical sites by country
