= Cerro Sechín =

Archaeological site in Peru

Coordinates: 9°28.58′S 78°15.40′W

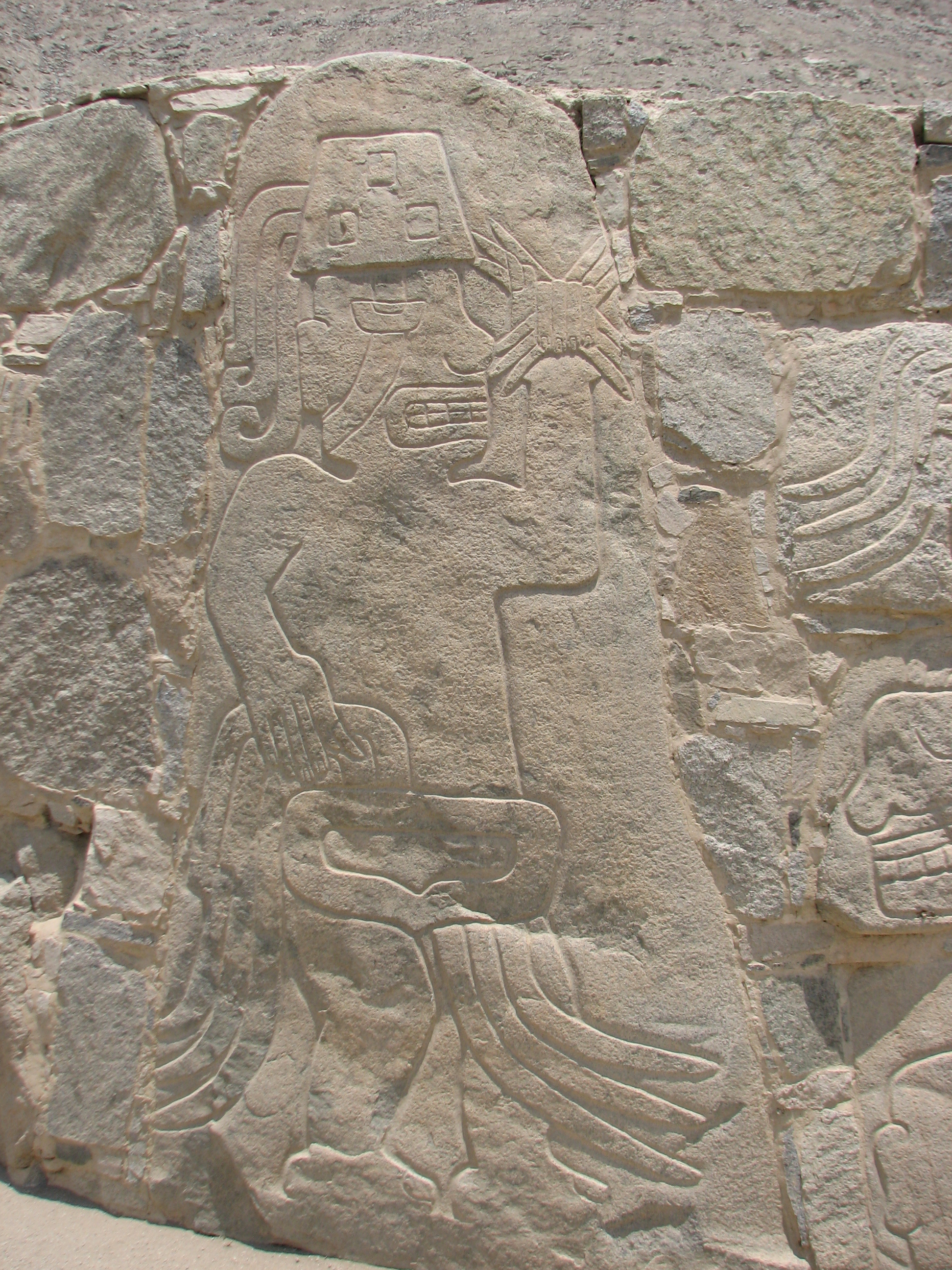
Relief of a warrior at Cerro Sechin.

Cerro Sechín (also Sechín de las Estelas) is an archaeological site in the Casma Province of the Ancash Region in northern Peru. Dating to 1600 BC, the site was discovered by Peruvian archaeologists Julio C. Tello and Toribio Mejía Xesspe on July 1, 1937. Tello believed it was the capital of an entire culture, now known as the Casma/Sechin culture or Sechin complex. Notable features include megalithic architecture with carved figures in bas-relief, which graphically dramatize human sacrifices. Cerro Sechín is situated within the Sechin Alto Complex, as are Sechin Bajo, and Taukachi-Konkan. There is a small on-site museum. The slabs at Cerro Sechin may represent the central Andes' oldest known monumental sculpture.

== Geography ==
Cerro Sechín sits on a granitic hill, in the Casma Valley. It is located 1 kilometre (0.62 mi) east of the Pan-American Highway, 5 kilometres (3.1 mi) from the provincial capital of Casma and 168 miles (270 km) north of Lima. It is situated 13 kilometres (8.1 mi) from the Pacific Ocean, near the confluence of the Sechin and Moxeke Rivers at an altitude of 90 metres (300 ft) above sea level. The site contains walled enclosures around dwellings as well as temple platforms. Although the archaeological site occupies approximately 5 acres (2.0 ha), the monuments are grouped in a single hectare.

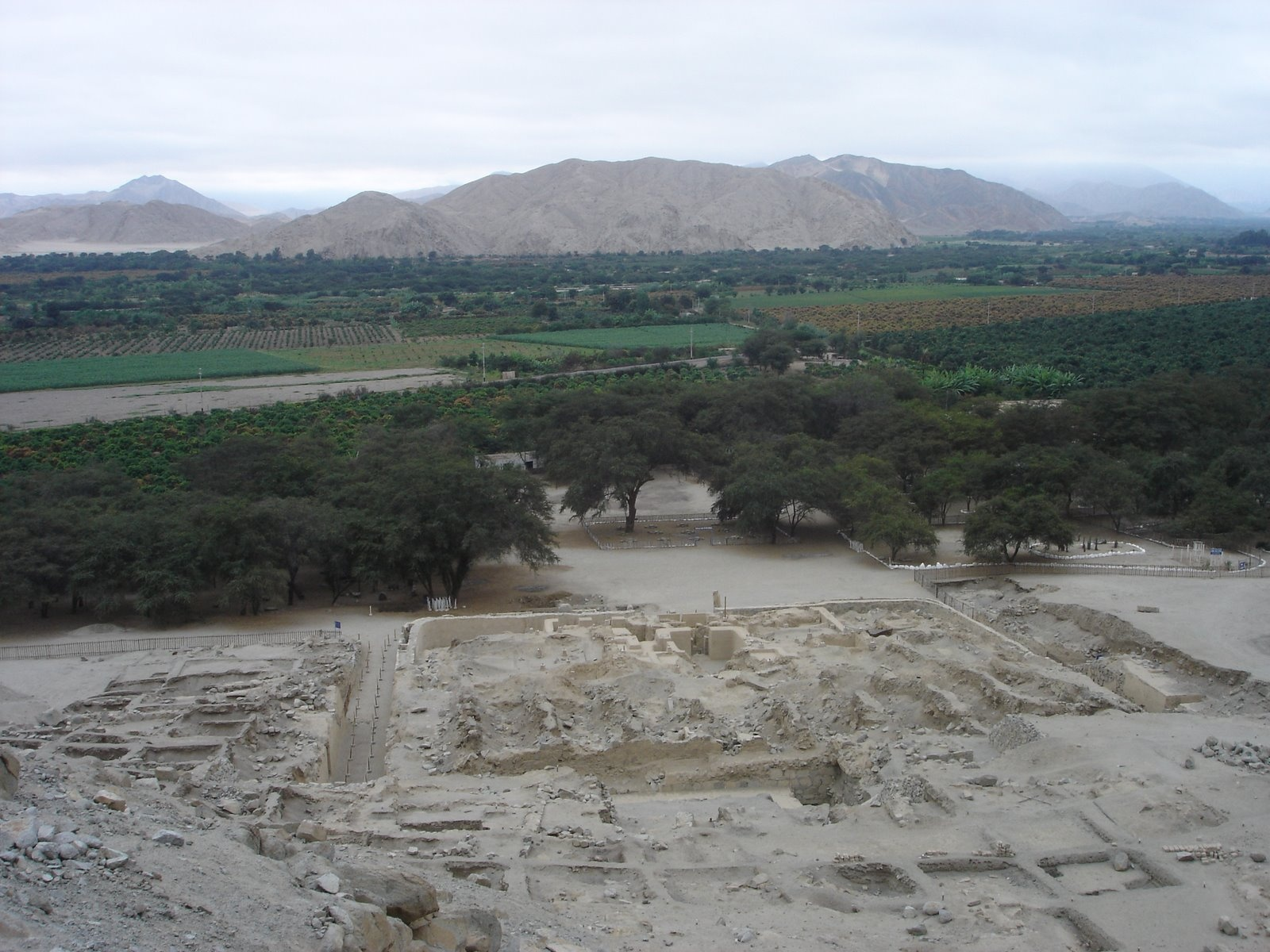
Sechin Complex in the Casma Valley.

The Sechin Complex is made up of several sites, including Cerro Sechin. In the Sechin riverbank, to the northeast, is the complex of Sechin Alto. Considered the greatest architectural complex in Peru, it covers 300–400 acres (120–160 ha). Sechin Bajo, nearest to Cerro Sechin, is on the other side of the river. Sechin Bajo was excavated in 1990 and its deeper layer was found in the year 2008; finds include the remains of a circular plaza of stone and mud dating to the Late Archaic period from 3,500 BC. Taukachi-Konkan is the northernmost of the sites within the complex.

== History ==
Who developed Cerro Sechin, how it was constructed, and the nature of the site's ceremonies are unknown; little is known about the community associated with the site. The site dates to 1600 BC, approximately the end of the Periodo Arcaico Andino period and early Formativo Inferior period. It was completed before 2000 BC but remained in use until about 1500 BC, before the start of the Chavín culture.

Rigorous excavation and research occurred at Cerro Sechin after its 1937 discovery by Tello and Xesspe. He felt that this monument was proof of the influence of the Chavin culture in the Casma Valley. Later research determined that Cerro Sechin predates the shrine of Chavin, making Cerro Sechin the forerunner of the architecture and iconography of Chavin. In terms of function, Cerro Sechin served as a central administration place for production, distribution and food stocks, and also of worship as a ceremonial center. Arturo Jiménez Borja and Lorenzo Samaniego worked together to further excavate the site between 1967-1974.

== Architecture ==
There are several buildings, made from clay and stone. One of the clay buildings, remodeled in three phases, dates between 2400 and 2300 BC. Flanking the main buildings are two other buildings (Building A and Building C) and two platforms (platform Julio Cesar Tello and platform Rafael Larco).

The main temple is 51 square metres (550 sq ft) and 4 metres (13 ft) in height.. It is one of the earliest Andean sites to feature large stone blocks as its primary building material, marking an important step in the region’s use of megalithic masonry. Much of the enclosure has been reconstructed, since many stones were discovered scattered across the site. About 200 of the 300 carved monoliths remained in their original positions (Salt, 2017). The walls consist of rough-fitted stones on both faces, joined with clay mortar, filled internally with loose rubble, and slightly inclined inward to enhance stability. The largest stones measure up to roughly nine feet in height.

The temple, rectangular in design with rounded corners, was constructed of conical adobes; its entrance is on the north side. Its perimeter wall of monoliths or stelae is of earlier construction. A double staircase, about 4 feet (1.2 m) high, leads to the top. On either side of this central stairway were two large murals depicting felines. Though the upper sections of these paintings have eroded, the clawed feet are still preserved. Their style closely matches a feline relief from nearby Mesapatac, dating to a similar period. This imagery may signal an early manifestation of the “Cult of the Feline,” later seen more prominently at Chavín de Huántar. Though roofs no longer survive, their design is evidenced on pottery vessels.

== Carvings ==
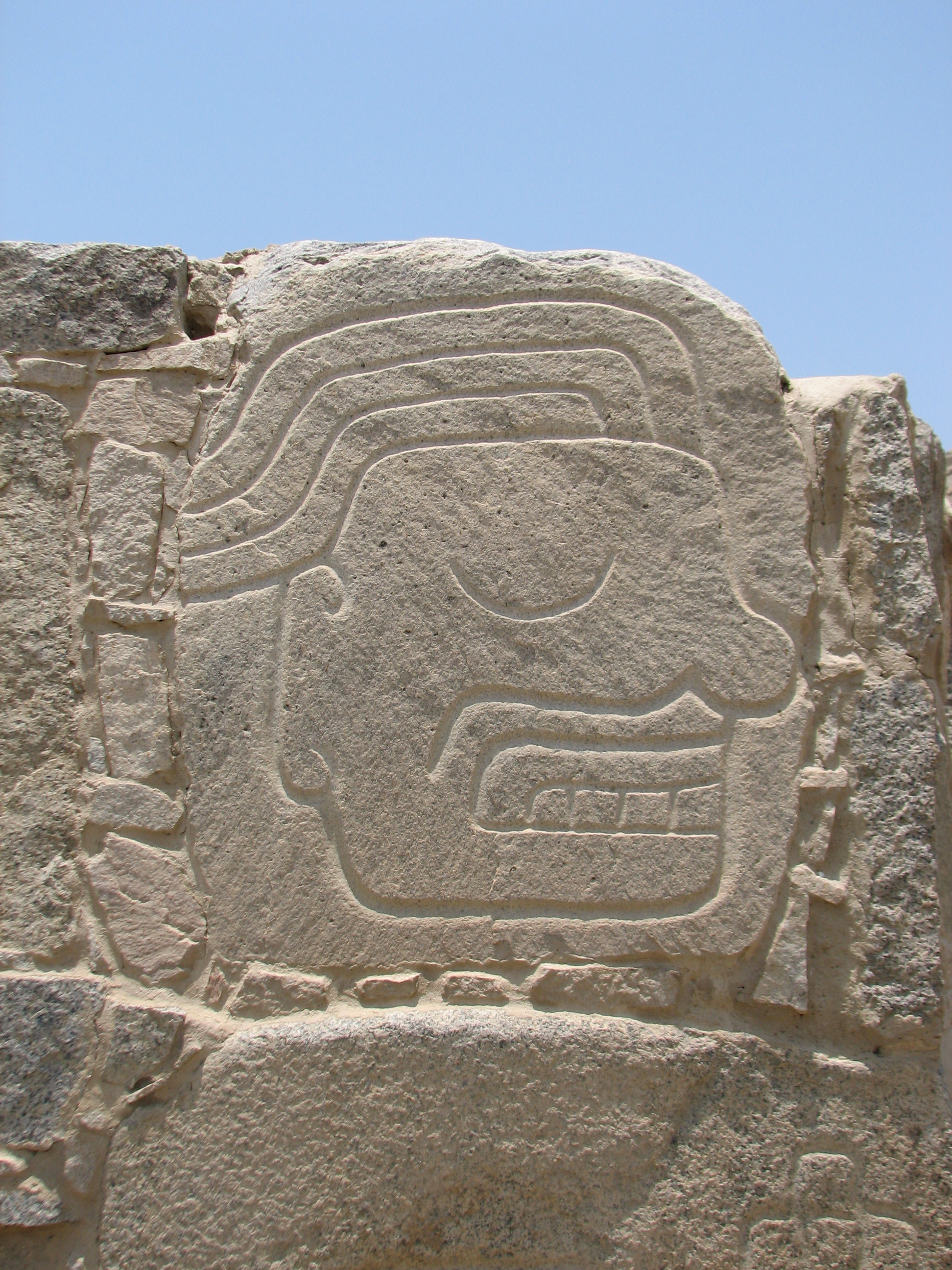
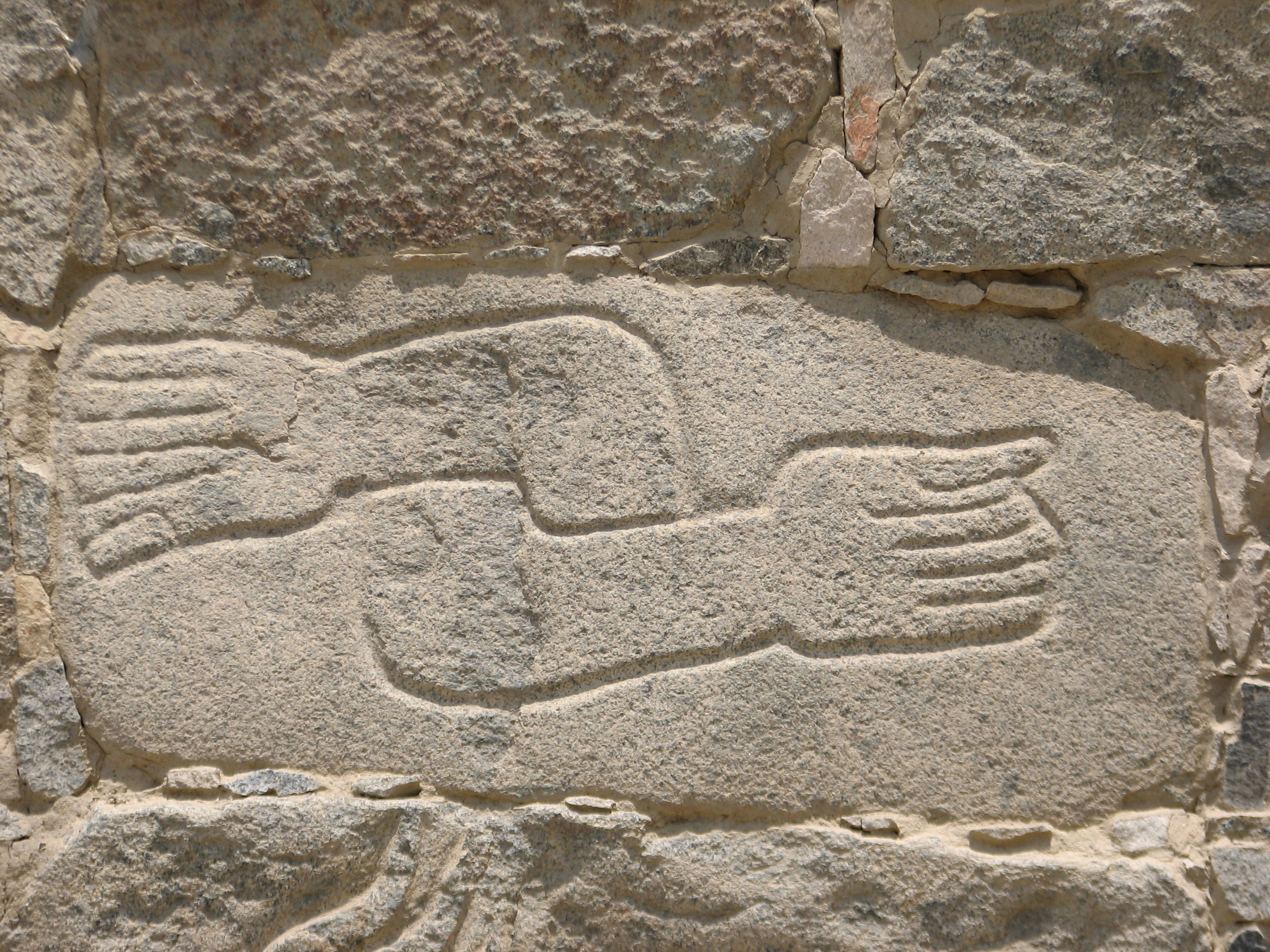
Left: Relief, head profile. Right: Relief, hands.

The most striking feature of the stone building is its lithic block facade decorated with reliefs representing "warrior priests" and mutilated bodies. The etched bas-reliefs number approximately 300, from axe-wielding warriors, to body parts, and victims, who are decapitated and mutilated. The characters are of two types: the warrior-priests (wearing a weapon or scepter) and dismembered victims or their offal (mainly heads, limbs, eyes skewered, intestines, vertebrae and viscera). These figures represent humans and demigods, without the presence of animals. In the interior of the adobe building, the main decoration is the best preserved. It depicts two mythological fish. Another figure depicts a man bleeding. These depictions closely relate to the sea, rain and human sacrifices. Carving methods include bevelled cuts, such as those found on body contours, and shallow incisions, such as those noted in eyelids and lips.

There have been various interpretations of the stone carvings. The site is often interpreted as depicting human sacrifices, made as offerings to their deities, which is a common and well documented practice across many early Andean cultures. Another interpretation is that of battle scenes, carved to commemorate a great battle, with foreign victorious warriors and defeated Casma people. An alternate theory is that the site was a laboratory for anatomical studies, which explains the explicit exposure of different parts of the human body, such as organs and bones. Yet another theory is that it represents a popular bloody rebellion, crushed by the ruling elite.

== See also ==
- Andean preceramic
