= Sechín River =

Seasonal river in Ancash, Peru

Coordinates: 9.4850°S 78.3003°W

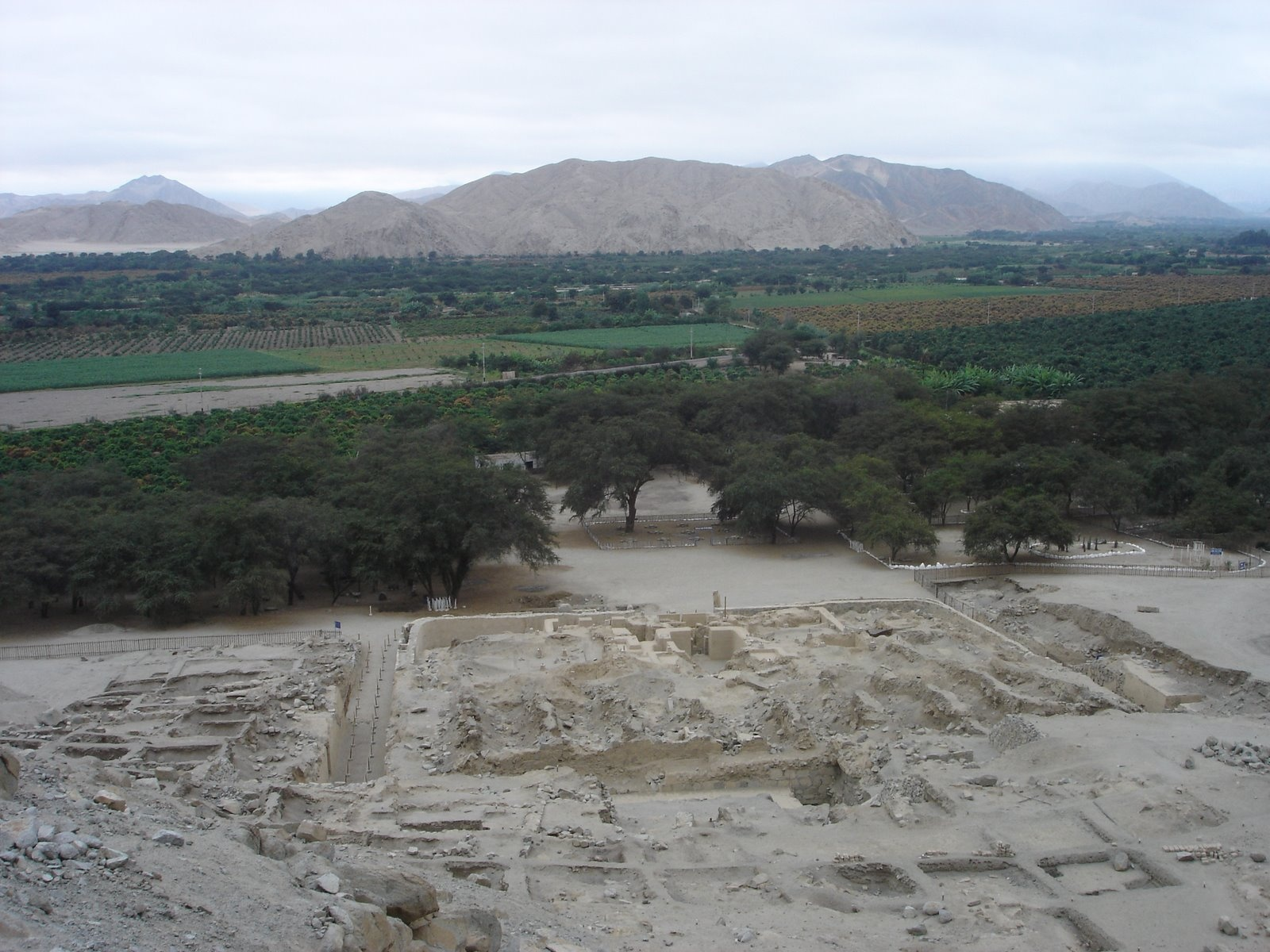
The Sechín valley and the ruins of the archaeological site of Cerro Sechín

The Sechín River is a seasonal river about 55 km (34 miles) long in the Ancash department of Peru that remains dry for long seasons, increasing its volume at times of rain in the mountains at its source. It is of irregular regime, due to this is known as Loco River. It rises at an altitude of 4,385 m (14,386 ft) in the Cordillera Negra and it ends by flowing into the Casma River about 10 km (6.2 miles) inland from the Pacific Ocean. The Casma-Sechin basin runs down the western slopes of the Andes mountain range - one of the world’s driest deserts. The city of Casma, population 30,000, is located near the junction of the two rivers. The Pan-American Highway crosses the Sechin River at Casma.

Historical records showed that the Sechín was severely affected by flooding in 1925 from an extremely strong El Niño cycle. Elders alive at the time recounted that the rains of 1925 were significantly stronger than those in 1871 and 1891, although the rains from 1891 were considered "calamatious."

The archeological site of Cerro Sechín was discovered near the Sechín River by Peruvian archeologist Julio C. Tello in 1937. Cerro Sechin is one of the archaeological sites of the Casma–Sechin culture along the two rivers. The Casma-Sechin culture is one of the oldest civilizations in the Americas with monumental architecture dating back to 3600 BCE.

== See also ==
- Cerro Sechín
- Mojeque
