= Michael E. Moseley =

American anthropologist

- Occupation: anthropologist

Michael Edward Moseley (March 28, 1941 - July 8, 2024) was an American archaeologist and anthropologist at the University of Florida.

== Early life ==
Moseley was born March 28, 1941, in Dayton, Ohio and died July 8, 2024, in Moquegua, Peru. Moseley received his Bachelor of Arts in anthropology from the University of California, Berkeley in 1963, and his Master of Arts and Ph.D. in anthropology from Harvard University in 1965 and 1968, respectively.

Moseley took part in excavation of a Lower Paleolithic (Acheulean) site in Ambrona, Spain, under F. Clark Howell in 1963, a survey and excavation of Cauca Valley sites in Colombia as assistant director of the Cambridge University Second Colombian Expedition in 1964, and an excavation of preceramic and early agricultural sites in central Peru from 1966 to 1967.

== Career ==
Moseley served at Harvard as instructor and lecturer from 1968 to 1970 and as assistant and associate professor from 1970 to 1976. He served at the Peabody Museum of Archaeology and Ethnology at Harvard as assistant curator from 1969 to 1973 and as associate curator from 1973 and 1975. He was co-director with Carol J. Mackey of the Chan Chan-Moche Valley Project in Peru, a survey and excavation of urban and pre-urban sites in the Moche Valley, from 1969 to 1975, and was advisor to the Instituto Nacional de Arqueologia in reconnaissance of Tiwanaku and related sites in the north highlands of Bolivia in 1976 and 1978–1979. He was project director of survey, mapping, and excavation of pre-Hispanic irrigation systems in northern Peru from 1976 to 1980.

Moseley was a research associate at the University of Chicago from 1980 to 1984 and was curator at the Field Museum of Natural History from 1976 to 1984.

Moseley became a professor at the University of Florida in Gainesville in 1984. He was project director of survey and excavations of historic sites in Tobago from 1989 to 1992 and senior scientist for Programa Contisuyo, exploration of archaeological sites in the Department of Moquegua in southern Peru, from 1980 to 2024.

Moseley served on the editorial boards of the journals Geoarchaeology (1986–1993), Latin American Archaeology (1991–1995) and Review of Archaeology (1987–2024).

He was a member of the National Academy of Sciences from 2000 and was a fellow of the American Association for the Advancement of Science and the American Academy of Arts and Sciences. He was Dumbarton Oaks Senior Fellow in Pre-Columbian Studies from 1983 to 1985 and was a Guggenheim Fellow during 1988–1989. Moseley was also a research associate of the Carnegie Museum.
