= Pallasca District =

Coordinates: 8°15′00″S 78°01′01″W

Pallasca
- District
- Interactive map of Pallasca
- Country: Peru
- Region: Ancash
- Province: Pallasca
- Capital: Pallasca

Government
  - Mayor: Manuel Aparicio Rafaile Huamayalli (2007)

Area
  - Total: 59.77 km^{2} (23.08 sq mi)
- Elevation: 3,131 m (10,272 ft)

Population (2005 census)
  - Total: 2,750
  - Density: 46.0/km^{2} (119/sq mi)
- Time zone: UTC-5 (PET)
- UBIGEO: 021508

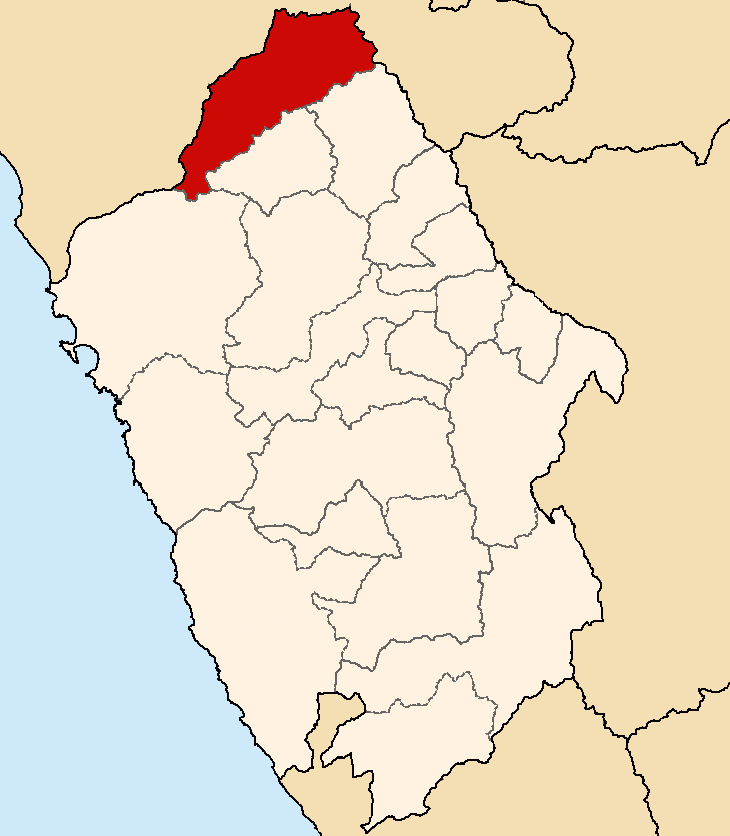
The Pallasca Province in Peru

Pallasca District is one of 11 districts of the Pallasca Province in the Ancash region in Peru.

== Location ==
Located in the North end of the Ancash Mountain range, Pallasca is one of eleven districts of the province of the same name and is bordered, in the south, by the districts of Huacaschuqué and Huandoval; in the east, by Lacabambá and Pampas; in the west, by Bolognesí, and in the north by Santiago de Chuco Province in La Libertad. It is situated approximately 3150 metres above sea level.

The population of the District of Pallasca is 5000 inhabitants.

== Geography climate, economy, flora and fauna ==
According to the geographic classification made by Dr. Javier Pulgar Vidal, Pallasca lies within the denominated Quechua Region. For that reason, its climate is relatively tempered, which does not prevent torrential rains between the months of November and March which feed the territory's crops which are the basic sustenance of the town.

The fact that it belongs to the Quechua Region does not, however, mean that the ancestral Language of the Incas is spoken there.

Pallasca is basically an agrarian district, dedicated mainly to the culture of la papa, maize and wheat; being, in addition, significant the gained raising of ganado vacunoand lanar; another occupation, in smaller scale, is artisanal crafts, mainly in the weave of "bayetas" (floorcloths), ponchos, etc.

Among the typical vegetation of the zone, it is possible to cultivate two aromatic plants, úñicá and panizará, used locally as infusions; these plants which could be commercialized on a great scale, would generate significant economic income for the population and, would also be an alternative (and perhaps more pleasant) beverage to the tea and other products.

The pallasquina flora is rich and varied. Some of the known plants or typical vegetation are as follows: yerba santa, Shiraque, tarsana, penca (maguey), molle, willows, carhuacasha; mora (blackberry), payaya, shugurom, purpuro (tumbo); Panizo, úñica; chulco, Achupallas; Aliza, eucalyptus. In addition, there are: wheat, potatoes, maize, quinoa, Coy (quiwicha), oca, etc.

== Access ==
The District of Pallasca can be accessed from Chimbote on the Coast, by a hard road whose construction in the final section, from Sacaycacha, was obtained thanks to the collective efforts of inhabitants in 1973, led by Orlando Alvarez Castro, a Captain of the Peruvian Army. Pallasca is practically interconnected with all the towns of the Province by means of hard roads that they had, because is enough, to be paved to obtain a faster, comfortable and advisable access.

== Folklore ==
In June each year, Pallasca celebrates the Feast in the honor of the region's patron saint, San Juan Baustista. In such occasion some beautiful folkloric patterns/tapestries (known as "festejos" in Pallasca), among which are the Suplicio and death of the Atahualpá Inca, the one of whose typical characters is "Quishpe"; the Osos, Quiyayas, Blanquillos, Indian Culculbambá, etc. also appear.

Other pleasing elements of the festival are the races of cintas and pedradas. Its centrepiece is the massive and fervent processions in tribute to the patron saint.

== History ==
Pallasca has history that goes back to the earliest times of la Spanish Conquest. Serious studies indicate that its name would come from Apollacsa Vilca Yupanqui Tuquiguarac, important noble Peruvian native who served during the passage of the first conquistadores, thus would have received coat of arms, according to the historian Felix Álvarez Brun in his book Ancash, a regional Peruvian history.

A fact which is apparently not so well known is that the corpse of Huáscar, the last legitimate heir of the Incan Empire, was thrown in waters of the River Tablachacá (formerly, Andamarca) by the Spanish conquistadores.

In the independence war, the district shared in the goals of the Peruvian people and the region contributed to its quota of men and equipment for the formation of the Army of liberation.

When the Chilean invasion took place, patriotic Peruvians refused to follow the abusive orders of the military leaders of the enemy force and preferred to face the enemy in unequal battle, with sticks, stones and hand-thrown weapons, resulting in thousands of dead and injured.
