= Bolognesi District =

Coordinates: 8°21′00″S 78°04′01″W

Bolognesi
- District
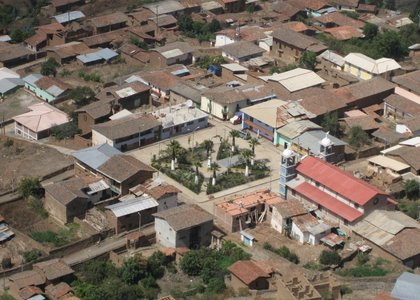
- Interactive map of Bolognesi
- Country: Peru
- Region: Ancash
- Province: Pallasca
- Founded: July 15, 1936
- Capital: Bolognesi

Government
  - Mayor: Andrés Germán Aparicio Reyes

Area
  - Total: 86.88 km^{2} (33.54 sq mi)
- Elevation: 2,800 m (9,200 ft)

Population (2005 census)
  - Total: 1,575
  - Density: 18.13/km^{2} (46.95/sq mi)
- Time zone: UTC-5 (PET)
- Website: bolognesiperu.com

The District of Bolognesi (Spanish: Distrito de Bolognesi) is one of 11 districts which are part of the Pallasca Province in Ancash, Peru.

To the north, it borders with the Pallasca District, to the east with the Huandoval District, to the south with the Cabana District and the Tauca District, and to the west with the La Libertad Region.

Bolognesi was known as Mormorullo and was part of the Cabana District until it was declared a district on its own on July 15, 1936.

== Population ==
According to the national statistics bureau of Peru, INEI, Bolognesi has a population above 1.500 inhabitants. The primary occupations are livestock and agriculture.

== Festivities ==
The town of Bolognesi celebrates the Festival in Honor of the Patron Saint Anthony of Padua each June 13. This is the main festival every year, which brings together people from all over the Pallasca Province as well as Bolognesi people from Chimbote, Lima, the United States and other places.

Another important festival is the Festival in Honor of the Pilgrim Virgin celebrated every November 21.

== See also ==
- Ancash Region
- Francisco Bolognesi
