= Caballo Muerto =

Archaeological site in Peru

Coordinates: 8.0712°S 78.9104°W

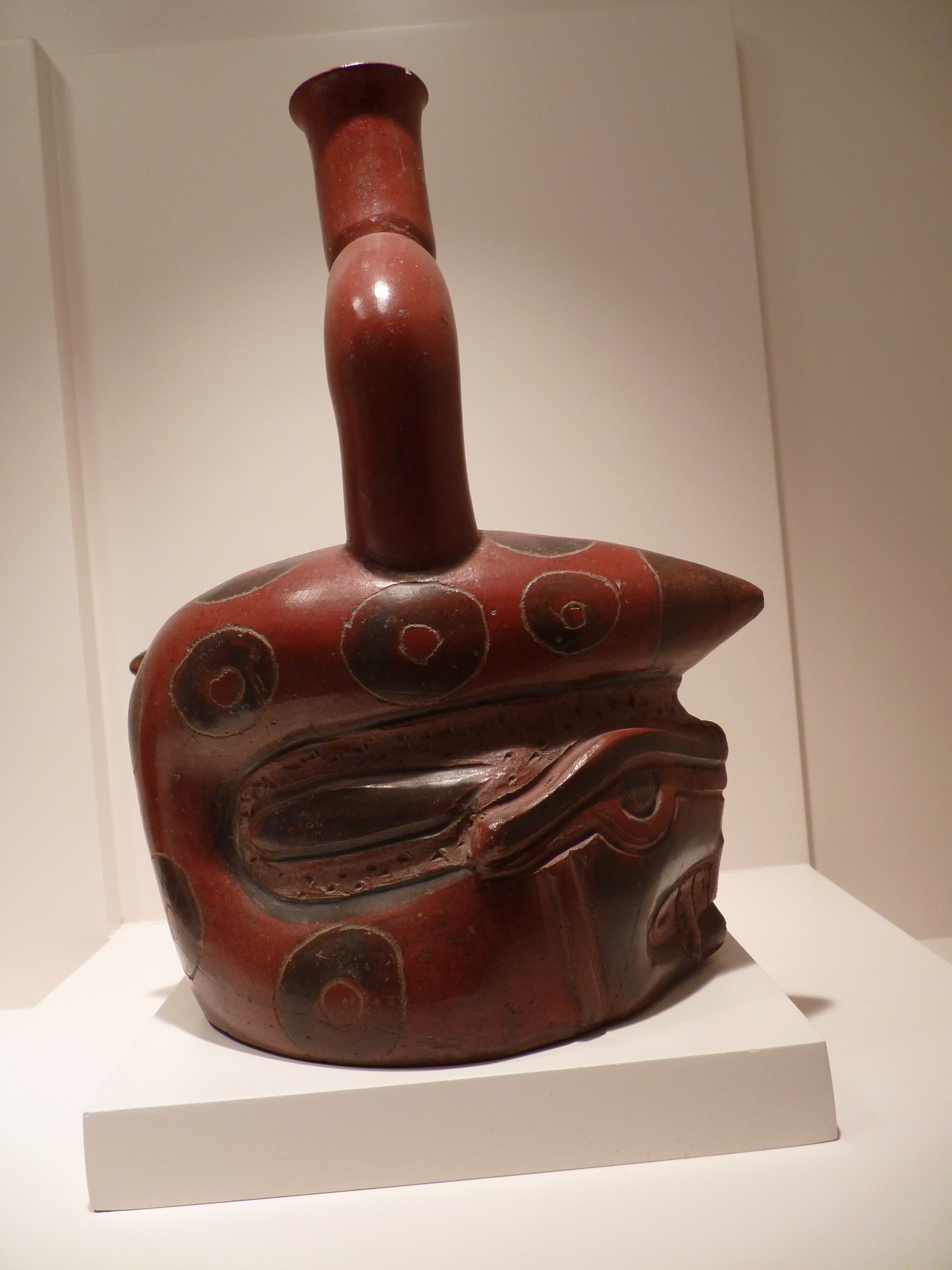
Example of Cupisnique pottery. Sculptured bottle, serpents with feline attributes. Museo de Arte Precolombino (Peru), Cusco

Caballo Muerto is an archaeological complex located on the northern coast of Peru, in the Moche Valley, in the Laredo District of La Libertad Region. It represents a series of mound sites that span both the Initial Period (2100–1200 CAL B.C.) and the Early Horizon (1200–200 CAL B.C.).

This site became prominent during the period of the Cupisnique culture. It includes about a dozen architectural sites built upon interlocking platforms. One of them is the important site of the Huaca de los Reyes. It has been declared as belonging to the Cultural Heritage of Peru by the Decree No. 999 of 4 October 2001.

== Location ==
The site is located in the middle sector of the Moche valley on the north shore of the river Moche, about 3 km NE of Laredo, Trujillo and about 20 km from the city of Trujillo, Peru. It covers 600 hectares where an estimated two thousand people lived.

== Discovery and studies ==
Caballo Muerto was discovered in 1972 by archeologist Michael E. Moseley of Harvard University, then director of the Chan Chan-Moche Valley Project. Other archaeologists working on the project include Luis Watanabe (1972), Thomas G. Pozorski (1973–1974), and Jorge Ruiz Barcellos.

== Timeline ==
It is believed that the site was occupied from 1500 to 400 BC and belongs to the Middle Formative period. Among the contemporary sites in the other valleys of the northern coast of Peru are Limoncarro in Jequetepeque, Cerro Blanco in Nepeña District of Ancash Region, Pallka in Casma Valley, Santa Lucia in Lambayeque Region, and Ñañañique in Piura Region. In the northern highlands, the related sites are Huacaloma, Kuntur Wasi (both near Cajamarca), and Pacopampa.

== Description ==
The archaeological complex of Caballo Muerto features stone and adobe constructions, with mud used as mortar. It consists of a dozen ceremonial buildings on constructed platforms, among them the Huaca de los Reyes. Several of these buildings exhibit a "U-shaped" layout that is common for Cupisnique sites. The walls are decorated with reliefs depicting snakes, cats and other images. Apart from the Huaca de los Reyes, there are the following constructions:

- Huaca Herederos
- Huaca Partida
- Huaca La Virgen
- Huaca La Cruz
- Huaca San Carlos
- Huaca Guabalito
- Huaca Curaca, etc.

The estimated volume of material (stone and silty clay) used for the six Early Formative Caballo Muerto Complex mounds is about 510,000 cubic meters; construction took place over a period of about 500 years.

=== Huaca Herederos ===
Huaca Herederos Chica is a monumental site that is part of the Caballo Muerto Complex. This mound was excavated from 1970 to 1973, and is now partially destroyed. It represents a superposition of several phases of occupation and building over some 1000 years period—each phase separated by phases of abandonment.

Some of the architectural elements here are similar to those of the Kotosh Religious Tradition at the highland sites of La Galgada (archaeological site) and Huaricoto as well as in the coastal Casma Valley.

Huaca Herederos Chica was abandoned from 1200 to 400 CAL B.C. only to be reoccupied and rebuilt in the late Early Horizon (400–200 CAL B.C.).

== Huaca de los Reyes ==
The most important and well studied in this area is the site of Huaca de los Reyes, showing a very complex structure with a "U-shaped" layout. It also includes overlapping platforms featuring access stairs, with plazas and hypostyle halls. The site includes friezes, as well as the giant heads constructed of clay representing characters with feline features, similar to Chavin style, yet preceding the Chavin chronologically.

== Economy ==
The economy of the inhabitants of Caballo Muerto was based on the use of irrigated land reclaimed from the desert. Irrigation canals were constructed. The proteins were obtained from land animals like deer; later, llamas were consumed. The people of Caballo Muerto, belonging to the Cupisnique culture, were the direct ancestors of the great Moche civilization.

== See also ==
- Ancient Peru

== Bibliography ==
- Kauffmann Doig, Federico: Historia y arte del Perú antiguo. Tomo 2, p. 210. Lima, Ediciones PEISA, 2002. ISBN 9972-40-214-2
- Kaulicke, Peter: El Perú Antiguo I. Los períodos arcaico y formativo, pp. 60–61. Colección Historia del Perú, editada por la Empresa Editora El Comercio S.A. Lima, 2010. ISBN 978-612-4069-86-4
- Silva Sifuentes, Jorge E. T.: Origen de las civilizaciones andinas, pp. 103–104. Incluida en la Historia del Perú. Lima, Lexus Editores, 2000. ISBN 9972-625-35-4
- Williams, Carlos: Arquitectura y urbanismo en el antiguo Perú Incluida en “Historia del Perú”, Tomo VIII, Perú Republicano y procesos e instituciones, pp. 424–428. Lima, Editorial Mejía Baca, 1980.
