= La Galgada (archaeological site) =

Coordinates: 8.470840°S 78.155291°W

A reconstruction of the site.

The archaeological site of La Galgada in Peru is an example of a ceremonial monument built within the Kotosh Religious Tradition during the preceramic, or Late Archaic period of Andean history. The site itself is located on the eastern bank of the Tablachaca River, the principal tributary of the Santa River. The site is located in the Tauca District of what is now the Pallasca Province of the Republic of Peru.

Situated in the mountainous Andean region, it is at a relatively low altitude of 1,100 metres above sea level. The archaeologists who excavated at the site in the late 1970s and early 1980s decided to call the monument "La Galgada" after the nearest town, a coal-mining settlement about 2 kilometres to the north, although local people instead referred to it as "San Pedro".

The Pre-Ceramic period was a time of change in the Andean region, with communities becoming more sedentary and beginning to construct monumental architecture both in lowland and highland regions.

== Historical background ==
=== The Andean Pre-Ceramic Period ===
The Lithic Period was followed by what archaeologists have called the Pre-Ceramic Period, or alternatively the Late Archaic Period, and is characterised by increasing societal complexity, rising population levels and the construction of monumental ceremonial centres across the Andean region. It is the latter of these features that remains the most visually obvious characteristic of the Pre-Ceramic amongst archaeologists, and indicates that by this time, Andean society was sufficiently developed that it could organise large building projects involving the management of labor. The Pre-Ceramic Period also saw a rise in the population of the Andean region, with the possibility that many people were partially migratory, spending much of their year in rural areas but moving to the monumental ceremonial centers for certain times which were seen as having special significance. The Pre-Ceramic also saw climate change occurring in the Andean region, for the culmination of the Ice Age had led to an end of the glacial meltback which had been occurring throughout the Lithic Period, and as a result the sea levels on the west coast of South America stabilized.

Despite these changes, many elements of Andean society remained the same as it had been in earlier millennia; for instance, as its name suggests, the Pre-Ceramic was also a period when Andean society had yet to develop ceramic technology, and therefore had no pottery to use for cooking or storage. Similarly, Andean communities in the Pre-Ceramic had not developed agriculture or domesticated flora or fauna, instead gaining most of their food from what they could hunt or gather from the wild, just as their Lithic Period predecessors had done, although there is evidence that some wild plants had begun to be intentionally cultivated.

=== Locality ===
The site around La Galgada was first occupied about 3000 BCE by agricultural communities who constructed small chambers that were different from their houses, presumably in which to perform ceremonial activities. It is clear from the archaeological evidence that they spent more effort in constructing the various ceremonial and mortuary monuments than in homes for themselves, an approach common to most pre-modern societies across the world. Archaeological surveys have established that during the Pre-Ceramic Period, at least 11 settlements had grown up throughout the Tablachaca Canyon, being concentrated on both sides of the river for at least 8 km near to the modern village of La Galgada. This led one of the head excavators, Terence Grieder, to comment that the La Galgada site must be seen as "one of the most important ceremonial and burial areas in a larger, well-populated district, which in Pre-ceramic terms must be considered virtually a metropolitan center".

== Architecture ==
At the La Galgada ceremonial site, the most prominent architectural features were the North and South Mounds.

== Burials ==
Another feature of La Galgada was its use as a mortuary site for the burial of the dead. Archaeologists investigating the site noted that there was both continuation and variation in the practice of human burial at the site, with most variation being in the position of the burials and the way that they had been prepared, whilst there was most continuity in the type of textiles and offerings deposited with the bodies.

=== F-12:B-2 burial chamber ===
Burial I, a corpse at the F-12:B-2 tomb in La Galgada. Archaeologists have established the figure to have been a male over the age of fifty, who was flexed on his right side. Surrounding him are cotton bags, baskets and gourd vessels that have been deposited as offerings.

In the burial chamber designated as F-12:B-2 by the archaeological team, a man and two women, all of them over the age of 50, were buried, each in a tightly flexed position with their arms crossed on their chest, and positioned on their left side. Once in this position, their bodies had been bound up with cotton cords; for the male, this had consisted of a dark brown cotton cord 1.3 mm in diameter that had unusually been Z-spun rather than plied, implying some special significance. Alternatively, the cotton used to bind the female corpses had been S-spun, Z-plied and yellow in color, and tied around them 20 to 25 times.

Tufts of human hair had been tucked around the bodies, and particularly around the torso and hips. It is possible that these tufts had belonged to the corpses themselves, who lacked any hair on their heads, instead wearing hats that appeared "makeshift" in design, as if they had originally been bags and a basket. Noting ethnographic evidence that a number of Andean Indigenous peoples believed that the human soul was especially present in the hair, archaeologist Terence Grieder suggested the possibility that the Pre-ceramic practice of stuffing human hair into the clothing of the corpses might represent "a way to keep the spiritually vital hair in contact with the body."

Another item found tucked in with two of the bodies was barkcloth, a versatile material made from the bark of certain trees. The male corpse was widely covered in dark brown strips of barkcloth about 3–4 cm wide, which were inside the strings but outside of the hair tufts, whilst one of the two women also had similar strips, but less than the man. Grieder suspected that the inclusion of this material was because those burying the dead thought that bark cloth had "spiritual power", a widespread belief that was found across the Pre-Columbian Americas.

== Archaeological investigation ==
By the 1960s, La Galgada had become a busy mining town, and the site had come under threat from looters who wanted to dig up the site in search of valuable artefacts. However, the town governor, Teodoro E. López Trelles, recognised the importance of the site for its archaeological value, and instituted measures to protect it from looters. In 1969, he gave a tour of the site to Terence Grieder of the University of Texas, who was then involved in the excavations at Patash, and who was sufficiently interested that he decided to investigate at the site following the culmination of the Patash project. In 1976, Grieder and his fellow archaeologist Alberto Bueno Mendoza returned to the site, and after realizing that the site was Preceramic in date - far older than they had previously suspected - began to raise funds for an excavation. In 1978 this began, with the project continuing on until 1985.
