= Kuntur Wasi =

Archaeological site in Peru

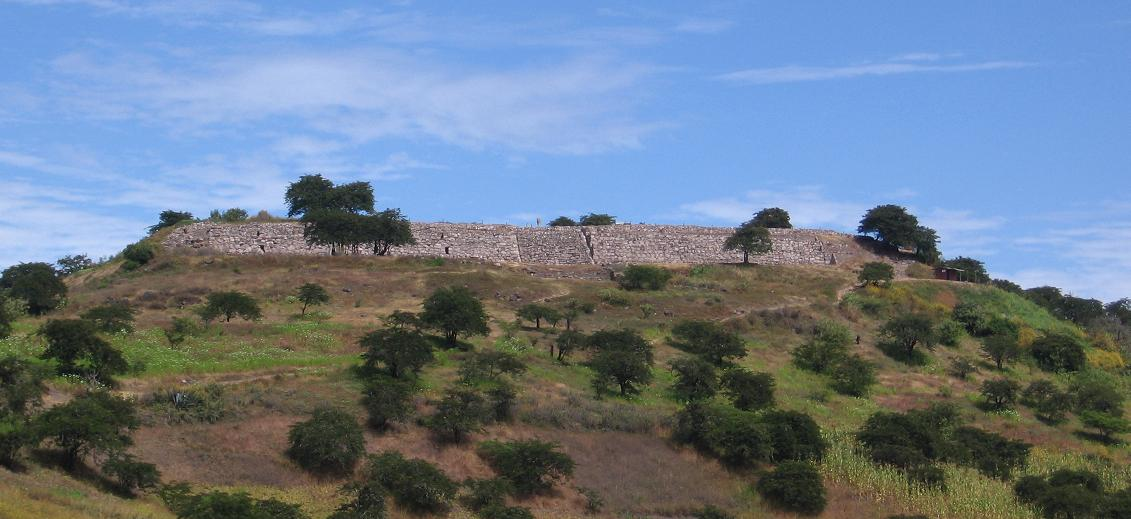
- View of the main platform of the archaeological site of Kuntur Wasi

- Location within Peru
- 07°07′46″S 78°50′43″W
- Type: Temple
- Periods: Initial Period
- Cultures: Chavín
- Location: Kuntur Wasi, San Pablo Province, Cajamarca

Site notes
- Archaeologists: Julio C. Tello, Yoshio Onuki
- Discovered: 1946
- Management: Kuntur Wasi Cultural Association

Kuntur Wasi (Quechua kuntur condor, wasi house, "condor house") is the name given to the ruins of a religious center with complex architecture and stone sculptures, located in the Andean highlands of Peru. It is believed the inhabitants had a link with the Chavín culture.

Kuntur Wasi is located on La Copa hill in the northern Andean highlands of Peru, in the San Pablo Province of the Cajamarca Region, near the village of Kuntur Wasi (formerly known as La Conga). The site is roughly 2,300 meters above sea level. The architecture consists of a hill-top temple, quadrangular platforms, a sunken courtyard, and a series of rooms.

== History ==
Kuntur Wasi is thought to have been occupied between 1100–50 BCE, being initially constructed around 1100-900 BCE, during the Initial Period. The chronology of Kuntur Wasi's occupation consists of four phases, "El Ídolo" phase (1100–900 BCE), the Kuntur Wasi phase (900–550 BCE), "La Copa" phase (550–250 BCE), and the Sotera phase (250–50 BCE).

The site was initially constructed during the Ídolo phase, which involved the flattening of the hill and the construction of platforms and plazas from plaster-covered stones painted white. A clay relief from this phase of a man with a feline face was found in association with a room located on a lower platform. This figure was named "El Ídolo", and gives the phase its name.

During the Kuntur Wasi phase, the hill was modified in order to build a raised rectangular platform with four stone walls. A staircase was built in the center of the main facade, facing northeast towards the summit. The focus of this modification was a U-shaped floor plan surrounding a sunken plaza, with three raised platforms creating the U shape. Also installed was a system of canals beneath the platforms and plazas, and a circular plaza with buildings around it. Tombs were found beneath two of these buildings.

In the Copa phase, the plaza was expanded and monoliths from the Kuntur Wasi phase were moved to different locations. Two more tombs were installed beneath the "arms" of the U-shaped plaza. The circular plaza was filled in with items from the Kuntur Wasi phase, including fragments of murals and pottery, and was converted into a rectangular plaza with a new canal beneath it. The Copa phase seems to have ended abruptly with the destruction of the U-shaped plaza. It was followed by the Sotera phase, in which much of the site was demolished before occupation ceased.

== Excavations ==
Terraces and a monolith at the site were first reported in 1946, after which Julio C. Tello sent an expedition to investigate. The initial excavation uncovered four more monoliths. Two by the stairs of the central plaza, one depicting a jaguar-man, and another that was broken in half. In 1948, Rebeca Carion Cachot published a summary of the study.

The National Cultural Institute of Lima tasked Dr. Yoshio Onuki of the University of Tokyo to define the site, and he arrived with his team in 1988. Locals from the village of La Conga aided in the excavation. In 1989, three tombs were discovered, followed by two more in 1990. The excavations led by Onuki's team uncovered seven more monoliths, including the two monoliths corresponding to the other two staircases of the central plaza, which had been moved during the Copa phase, and multiple depicting humans with feline features or jaguars. While all of the monoliths were found in context of the Copa phase, their designs better reflect the Kuntur Wasi phase, leading to the conclusion that they were simply moved around during the Copa phase.

Four more tombs were discovered in 1996 and 1997. These were "shaft tombs" that each contained one body alongside rich offerings. Valuable items, such as pectoral necklaces (decorative breastplates), gold crowns, ornamental stone beads, earrings, sets of dishes and iconographies of people were discovered in the burial area.

== Preservation ==
In 1972, the National Cultural Institute of Lima supported an initiative created by the Committee of Farmers for the Defense of the Kuntur Wasi Heritage in order to protect the site from robbery. In June of 1977, the committee was authorized to formally become part of the Institute. During excavations, the people of La Conga were hesitant to send artifacts away to the National Cultural Institute, so the Institute agreed to allow the Committee to retain custody of the artifacts. In 1991, the Committee sent artifacts from Kuntur Wasi to Japan for an exhibition in order to raise money to build a museum. The Kuntur Wasi Museum opened in 1994, and is managed by the Kuntur Wasi Cultural Association (which succeeded the Committee) and a Women's Committee.

== Gallery ==
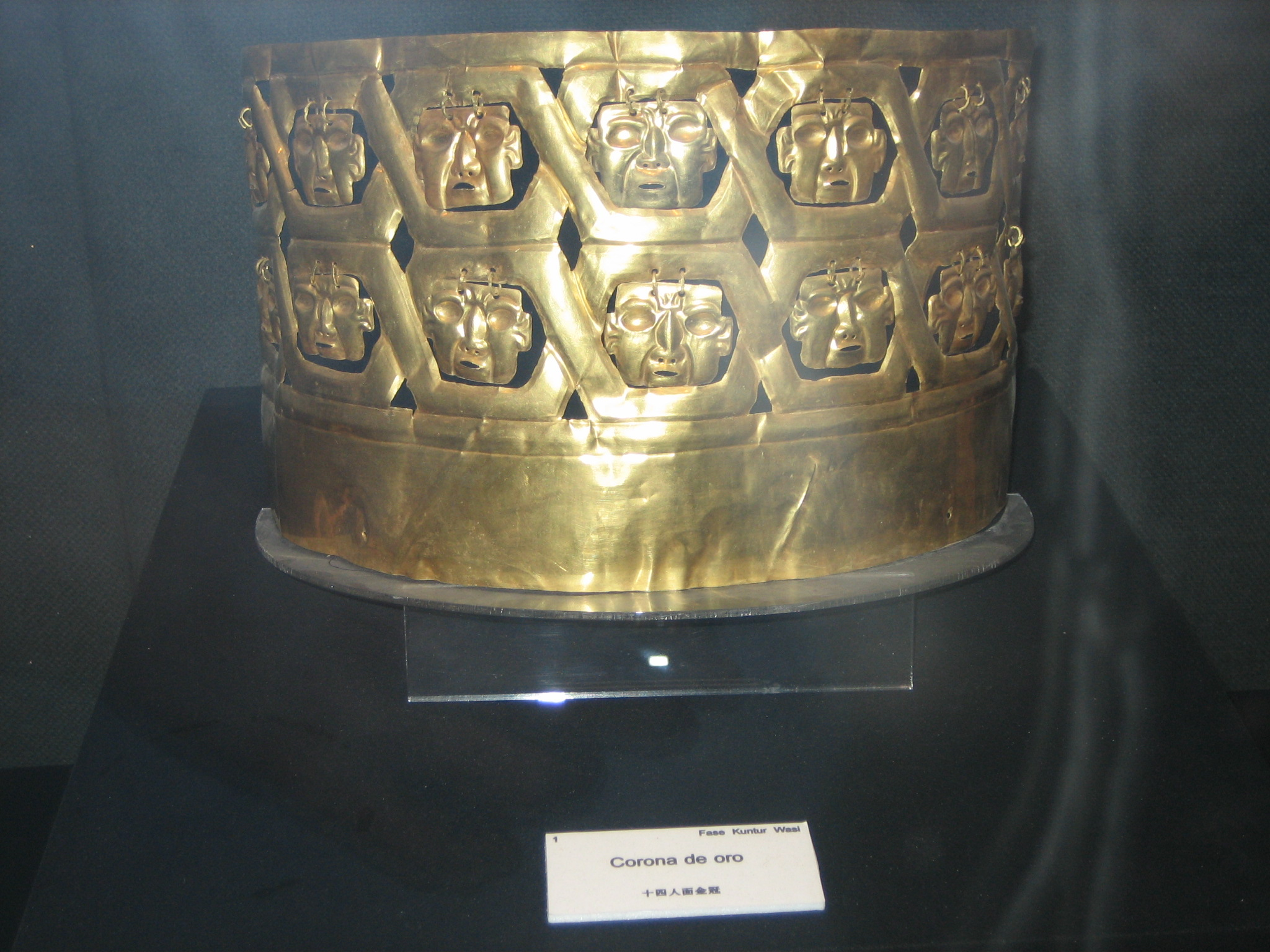
'The crown of the fourteen faces' of one of the excavated tombs of Kuntur Wasi. It was part of the funerary equipment of the ruling elite

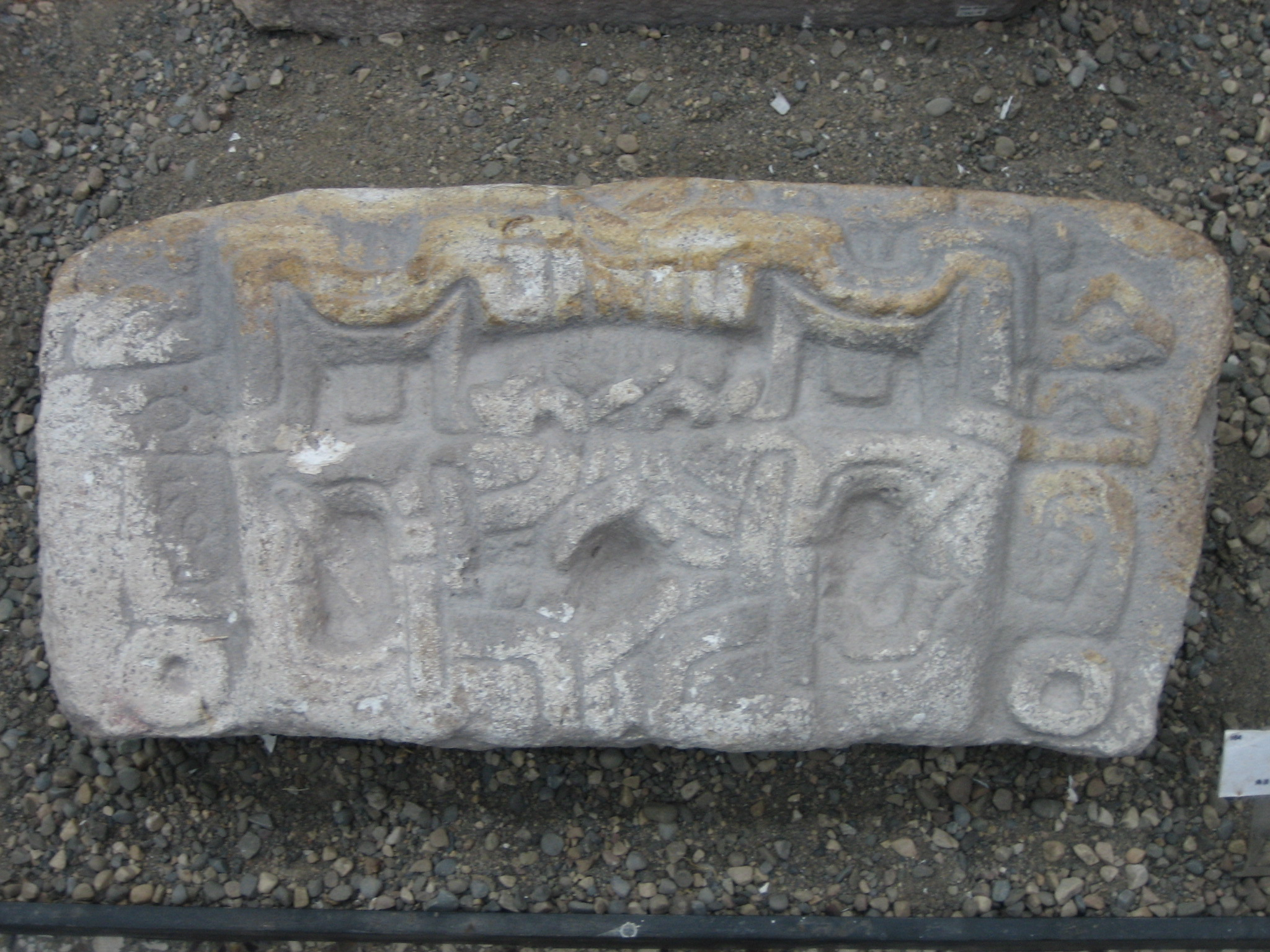
Chavinoid relief of Kuntur Wasi, note the tusks and face tabby typical of Chavín art

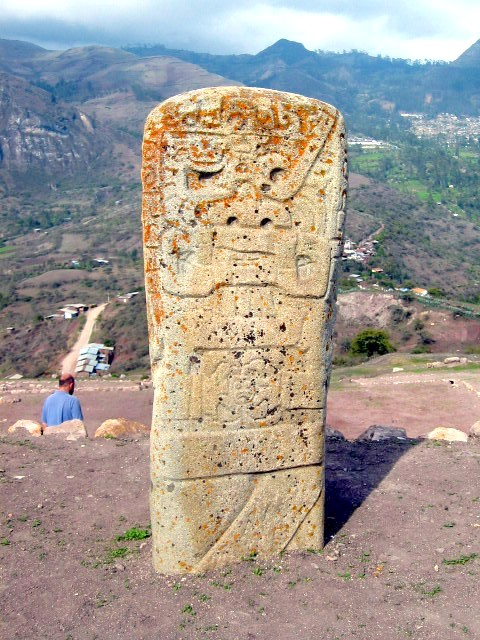
Monolith Chavín on a platform of Kuntur Wasi

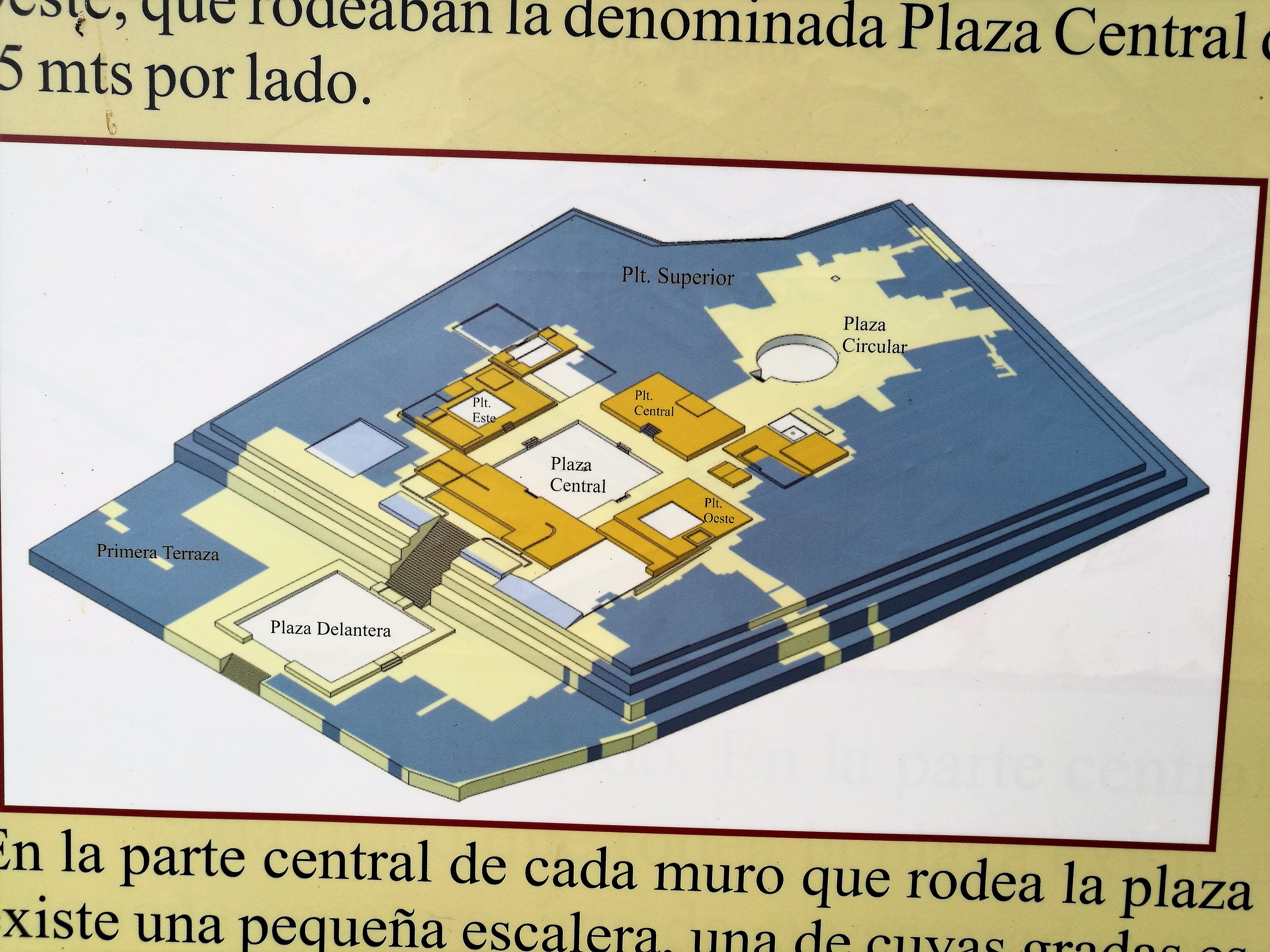
Diagram of Kuntur Wasi

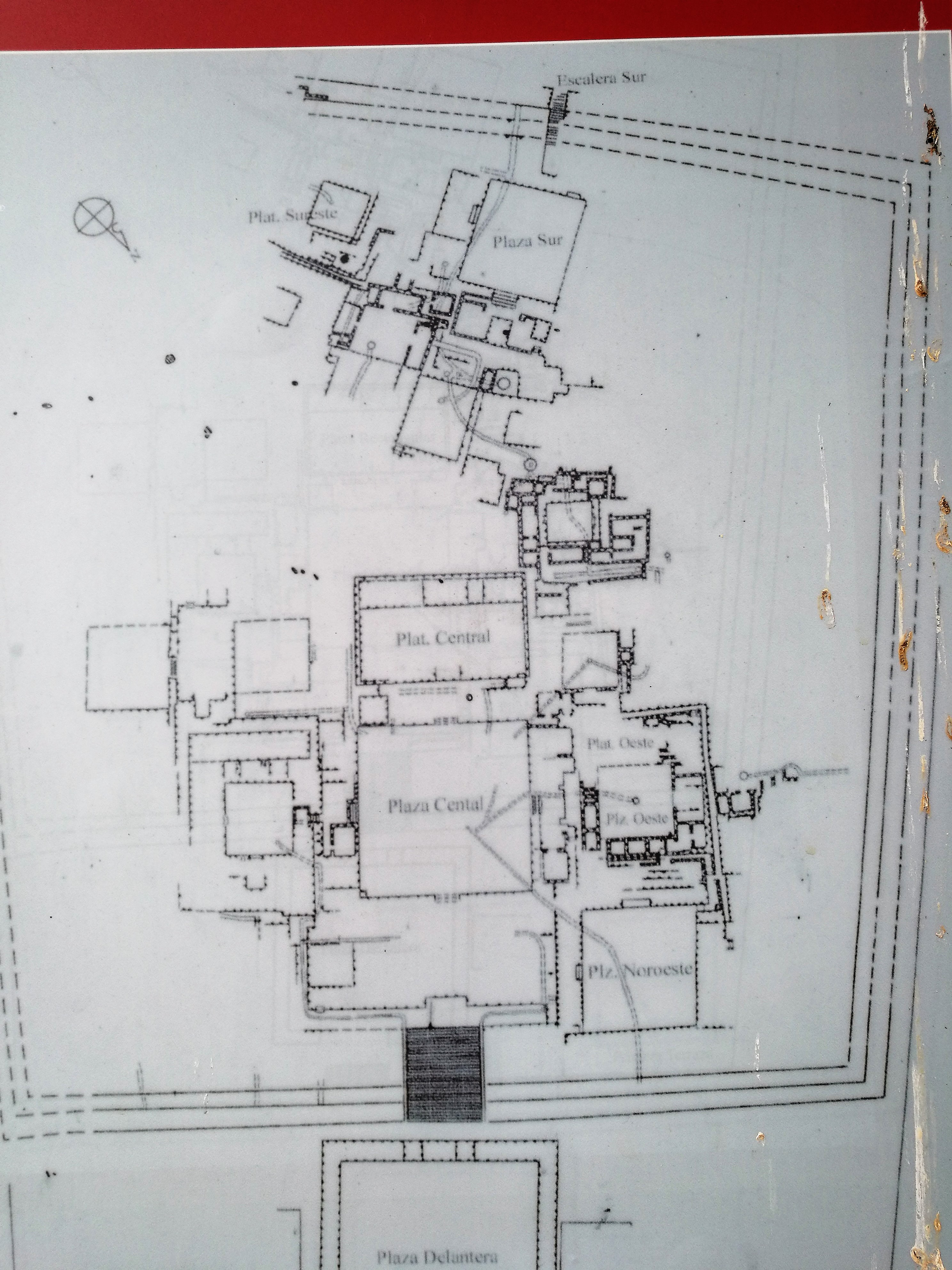
Floor plan of the Copa phase

== See also ==
- Cultural periods of Peru
- Cupisnique
- Kotosh
- Corantijn Basin, Suriname
- Archaeological sites in Peru
