= Wayq'uqucha =

Lake in Peru

- Location within Peru
- Location: Peru; Ancash Region
- Coordinates: 8°17′35.4″S 77°41′44.4″W
- Surface area: 0.11571540 km^{2} (115,715.40 m^{2})
- Surface elevation: 3,997 m (13,114 ft)

Wayq'uqucha (Quechua wayq'u brook; valley, qucha lake, "brook (or valley) lake", also spelled Huaycococha) is a lake in the Andes of Peru. It is situated at a height of 3,997 m (13,114 ft) comprising an area of 0.11571540 km^{2} (115,715.40 m^{2}). Wayq'uqucha is located in the Ancash Region, Pallasca Province, Conchucos District.
