= Pariacocha (Pallasca) =

Lake in Peru

- Location within Peru
- Location: Peru; Ancash Region
- Coordinates: 8°19′16.5″S 77°53′1.8″W
- Surface area: 0.025258 km^{2} (25,258 m^{2})
- Surface elevation: 4,250 m (13,940 ft)

Pariacocha (possibly from Quechua parya reddish, copper or sparrow, qucha lake, "reddish (copper or sparrow) lake") is a lake in the Andes of Peru. It is situated at a height of 4,250 m (13,940 ft) comprising an area of 0.025258 km^{2} (25,258 m^{2}). Paryaqucha is located in the Ancash Region, Pallasca Province, Conchucos District, northwest of Quinuacocha (Quechua for "quinoa lake").
