= Cabana, Peru =

Cabana Qawana
- City
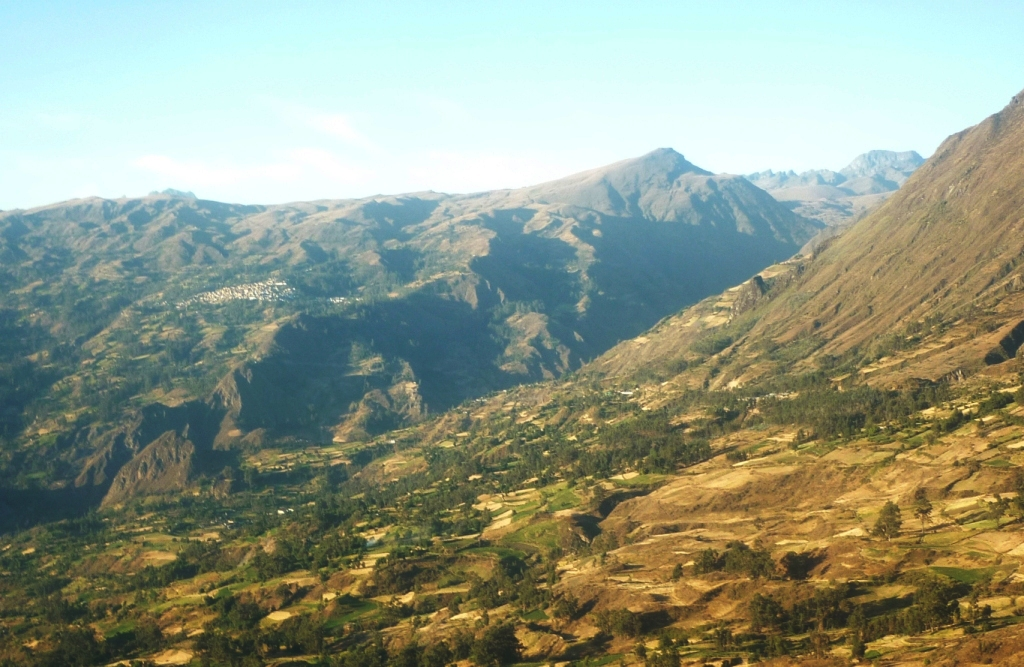
- Cabana as seen from Tauca District

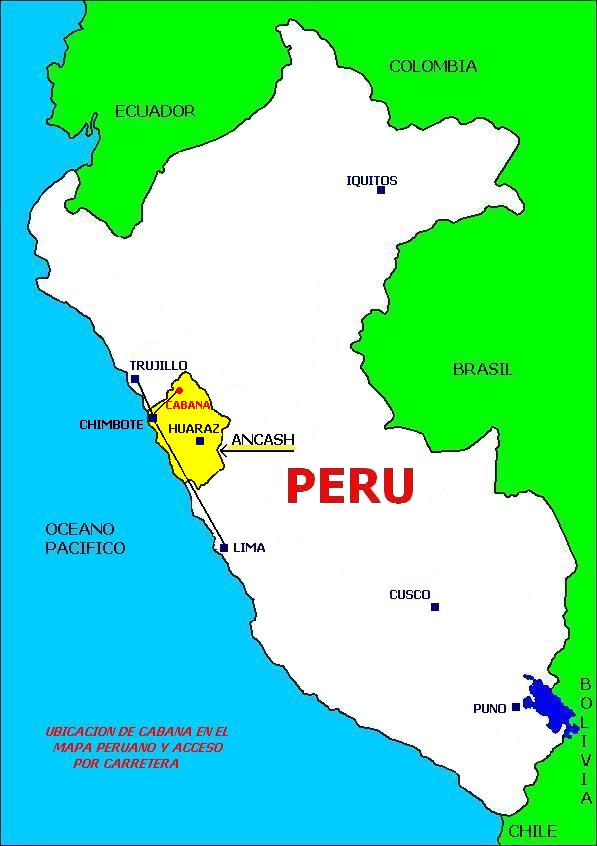
- Location of Cabana in the Pallasca province
- Coordinates: 08°23′44″S 78°00′59″W
- Country: Peru
- Region: Ancash
- Province: Pallasca
- District: Cabana
- Founded: January 2, 1857

Government
  - Mayor: Augusto Gerardo Vasquez Heredia

Area
  - Total: 150.29 km^{2} (58.03 sq mi)
- Elevation: 3,224 m (10,577 ft)

Population (2005 census)
  - Total: 2,918
  - Density: 19.42/km^{2} (50.29/sq mi)
- Time zone: UTC-5 (PET)
- UBIGEO: 021501

Cabana is a city in Peru. It is the capital of both the Cabana District and the Province of Pallasca in the Ancash Region of northern Peru. Cabana was founded on January 2, 1857, although human habitation there likely predates arrival of the Spanish Conquistadors.

The city is divided into four neighborhoods:

- Huayumaca
- Pacchamaca
- San Jerónimo
- Trujillo

Cabana is the birthplace of former President Alejandro Toledo.

== History ==
Cabana was founded in 1711 with the name of "Caguana" which means "To repair" or "to contemplate" in the Cully Language (former language of this region) according to an old legend.

When the Spanish conquerors arrived to Caguana, the name was mispronounced and started to say "Cabana" instead of Caguana.

Cabana was officially created by the Provisional Regulations on February 12, 1821, and then comprised to the vast province of Conchucos.

Cabana was elevated to the level of district on December 2, 1856, under the Presidency of Don Ramón Castilla.

Then in 1861, the province of Conchucos was divided into two provinces: Pallasca and Pomabamba, the first with its capital Corongo and the second with its capital Pomabamba.

On October 30, 1901, Cabana was elevated by law in the Capital of the province of Pallasca, this Act also gave him the title of "Villa" and on November 18, 1914, obtained the rank of City under Law No. 2631, a proposal of Priest Teodoro Gonzales Melendez and identified by Congressman Don Fausto Valdeavellano.

On January 26, 1943, by Act No. 9821 the Pallasca province was divided into two provinces: Pallasca with its capital Cabana and Corongo with its capital Corongo city. This law rules until today's days.

Cabana is one of the 11 districts that conforms the province of Pallasca in the Ancash Region. It limits the north with the districts of Bolognesi and the Huandoval, the east and the south with the province of Corongo and the west with the district of Tauca.

== Climate ==
Climate data for Cabana, elevation 2,985 m (9,793 ft), (1991–2020)
Month	Jan	Feb	Mar	Apr	May	Jun	Jul	Aug	Sep	Oct	Nov	Dec	Year
Mean daily maximum °C (°F)	14.8 (58.6)	14.3 (57.7)	13.8 (56.8)	14.7 (58.5)	16.0 (60.8)	16.7 (62.1)	16.8 (62.2)	17.1 (62.8)	16.8 (62.2)	15.7 (60.3)	15.6 (60.1)	14.8 (58.6)	15.6 (60.1)
Mean daily minimum °C (°F)	7.5 (45.5)	7.6 (45.7)	7.6 (45.7)	7.6 (45.7)	7.2 (45.0)	6.6 (43.9)	6.5 (43.7)	6.6 (43.9)	7.0 (44.6)	7.2 (45.0)	7.2 (45.0)	7.2 (45.0)	7.2 (44.9)
Average precipitation mm (inches)	117.5 (4.63)	129.6 (5.10)	196.7 (7.74)	101.7 (4.00)	29.4 (1.16)	6.0 (0.24)	4.3 (0.17)	3.7 (0.15)	18.8 (0.74)	61.2 (2.41)	57.7 (2.27)	105.4 (4.15)	832 (32.76)
Source: National Meteorology and Hydrology Service of Peru

== Traditions and Festivities ==
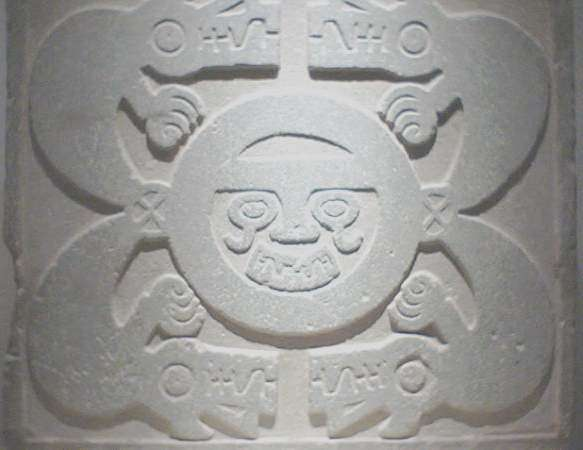
Engraved stone from Cabana. Belongs to the Pashash culture, around 500 AD

=== Easter ===
Easter is celebrated in Cabana similar to the festivities in Ayacucho, Peru. Easter is celebrated for an entire week. Starting on Palm Sunday in which the Cabanistas recall the triumphal entry of Jesus into Jerusalem sitting on a donkey. On Holy Wednesday, the statues of Jesus and Maria are taken out in procession, recalling the famous encounter between these two religious characters. On Holy Thursday, after Mass, where the priest wash the feet to the brotherhood members of Holy Thursday, the statue of Jesus crucified is taken out in procession. Good Friday at 3 pm, the cabanistas recall the death of Jesus and later in the night the image of Jesus in his coffin is taken out in procession. On Holy Saturday the image of Jesus alive is taken out in procession.

=== Santiago Apostle Festivities ===
The festivities in honor of Santiago Apostle is celebrated in two weeks in July each year. Starting July 16 and ends on July 25, the Central day.

The festivities in honor of the Santiago Apostle, are probably the most important festivities celebrated in Cabana. For two weeks hundreds of people come to Cabana from all over the world to be witness and enjoy the food, dances and all that Cabana offers to its visitors.

During these festivities, people in Cabana don't have time to rest. There is music all day long that goes until 4 or 5 in the morning. Visitors can find food and beverages for free during this festivities.

For two weeks people dance in honor of Santiago Apostle but on July 24 and July 25, people in Cabana attend mass and procession of Santiago Apostle for the streets of Cabana.

This festivity is also celebrated in Chimbote, Lima and in different cities in the United States of America.

== Dances ==
They represent past events as a tribute to the beliefs, desires and reflections of a people, we would say that dances update the story of a place and its inhabitants. In the Andean world dances are preserved from centuries old. Cabana pays tribute to the Patron Santiago Apostle with colorful dances, among them are: The Mojiganga, The Blanquillos and The Kiyayas; each of them with varied components between choreography, costumes, songs, music and interpretation.

=== The Mojiganga ===
Castilian word that means jocoso - funny, this stamp was introduced by the Spaniards, they represent the social situation of the people, shows characters from various social strata. The Mojiganga can be seen in two moments in the patronal festivities, which takes place every year in July, (1) very early in the mornings run on the main streets of the city inviting the general public to the "paseo de res" (la vaca) that will be delivered in the afternoon to one of the devotees (stewards) of the party And (2) in the afternoon when delivering the Paseo de res (la vaca) and dance to the beat of cash or Roncador.

The characters that are depicted are: the patron and the patrona who are the people who have money and in place, the shepherd and shepherdess representing mestizos or rural people and the Vilches who is the intermediate character, expresses power domain on the cattle.

The dresses of the patron and patrona are very luxurious. The man wears suits, wearing a hat and cane, the lady wears dress, veil, wallet and shoes stick.

The shepperds wear an elegant dress, suitable for the party. The lady wears an embroidered skirt, blouse, ojotas and straw hat, and the pastor's cloths are dress trousers, shirt, wool poncho, pannier, straw hat and carries a whip in his hand.

The Vilches wears a dress embroidered with fine gold or silver thread, a crown of feathers with colored mirrors and, in the back enjalma carries a reminder that is painted or corduroy cloth embroidered with threads of gold leaf and presents varied reasons, also brings in a neck moñera (decorative ribbon) around the waist and a painted or embroidered pechera subsequently placed the res (la vaca).

All of them wear special masks.

=== The Blanquillos ===
Groups of warriors who were born in reaction against Spanish domination, like the "Huanca" and "shacshas." The Blanquillo, toured many parts of Culture Conchucos, where the Spaniards were in place for killing them.

These groups were warriors formed by townspeople Pasha, Spaniards and mestizos. They used to go early in the mornings fighting in main square of the city, that is why this dance shows the power struggle of those years. In those days, the "Pashas" spoke the "Cully" language and worshipped the god "Catequilla ".

We can see this stamp on July 24 and July 25 of each year. The Blanquillo dance through the main streets of the city to accompany the procession of Santiago Apostle.

The group formed by 10 or 12 people, all wear elegant dresses made of corduroy fabric, yarn ornaments with gold leaf (Spanish-style), carry a face mask, a crown of feathers and colorful scarf colors.

While on tour, the Blanquillo puts his scarf on the shoulder of someone on the audience who would reward him with money, candy or soda.

=== The Kiyayas ===
Cully word that means "consecrated women". These group of ladies were designed to worship the "God Catequilla" and other gods (sun, moon, lightning and the rainbow). Always being around priests and the head of the high hierarchy of the Pashas.

The Spaniards tried to exterminate this practice with its decrees and laws which were against cults, customs and languages.

The KIYAYAS survived these abuses but as a stamp dance.

Like the "Blanquillo", the "kiyayas" are seen during the festivities in honor of the Santiago Apostle in July each year. Wearing a black skirt, with an opening from the side, decorated with threads of gold leaf and grecas of gold or silver, below the number fustanes wore white skirt decorated with special fabrics and reasons of culture Pasha, a white blouse with wide sleeves and bulky, In the head wearing a crown of showy flowers and tulle is covered with a bank, leather shoes are usually light. All of them wear silver jewelry.

=== Toro de Trapo ===
Dance manners paying tribute to the Virgin of Llactabamba. They accompany the "mamita" in the ascent to Cabana and return to his temple every year in November. The sire of this rag up on a wooden frames, lined with a white cloth and a black pañuelon in his spine is charged by a skilled volunteer who dances gleefully around of the Virgin statue.

== Tourism ==
The District of Cabana counts on many archaeological vestiges, being the most excellent Strength of the Pashash, that could be the central bunker of defense and religious cult of the Conchucos Region; according to the history : "Here it was the seat of ídolo Katequilla(Divinidad of the Conchucos and the Huamachucos". In addition it also counts on the Ruins of Mashgonga.

== Cabanistas ==
In Lima, capital of the Republic, the cabanistas count on the Cabanista Association, like their first representative institution, as well as with several organizations without profit aims that congregate their children, like the Sport Club Cabana Not 1, brotherhood 25 of Julio of resident children of Cabana in Tawantinsuyo and the most recent Cultural Project Cantarria. There are also other organizations in Chimbote and the US.

== Archaeology ==
The archaeological site of Pashash is located near Cabana. It gave its name to the Pashash culture (500-1000 AD). Many artifacts of this culture have been found in the area.

Pashash culture is seen as a later development of Recuay culture. It developed in the northern Sierra de Ancash region. Its remains are also found in Chacas, a town located in the east-central region of Ancash, and in other places.

== See also ==
- Ancash Region
- Pallasca Province
