= Challhuacocha (Ancash) =

Lake in Huánuco, Peru

- Location within Peru
- Location: Peru; Ancash Region
- Coordinates: 8°14′03″S 77°45′31″W
- Surface area: 0.460868 km^{2} (460,868 m^{2})
- Surface elevation: 3,878 m (12,723 ft)

Challhuacocha (possibly from Quechua challwa fish, qucha lake, "fish lake") is a lake in Peru located in the Ancash Region, Pallasca Province, Conchucos District. It lies southeast of Lake Pelagatos, northwest of the lake named Labrascocha (possibly from Quechua Lawrasqucha) and north of the village of Challuacocha (possibly from Quechua Challwaqucha). It is situated at a height of 3,878 m (12,723 ft) comprising an area of 0.460868 km^{2} (460,868 m^{2}).

A little river named Challhuacocha connects the lake with the town of Conchucos in the southwest.
