= Llapo District =

Coordinates: 8.533°S 78.067°W

Llapo
- District
- Interactive map of Llapo
- Country: Peru
- Region: Ancash
- Province: Pallasca
- Founded: January 2, 1857
- Capital: Llapo

Government
  - Mayor: Josselito Senen Luna Ruiz

Area
  - Total: 28.69 km^{2} (11.08 sq mi)
- Elevation: 3,480 m (11,420 ft)

Population (2005 census)
  - Total: 642
  - Density: 22.4/km^{2} (58.0/sq mi)
- Time zone: UTC-5 (PET)
- UBIGEO: 021507

Llapo District is one of eleven districts of the Pallasca Province in Peru.
