= Santa Rosa District, Pallasca =

Coordinates: 8°31′01″S 77°46′01″W

Santa Rosa
- District
- Interactive map of Santa Rosa
- Country: Peru
- Region: Ancash
- Province: Pallasca
- Founded: December 10, 1917
- Capital: Santa Rosa

Government
  - Mayor: Elva Elcira Matienzo De Rodriguez

Area
  - Total: 298.77 km^{2} (115.36 sq mi)
- Elevation: 2,370 m (7,780 ft)

Population (2005 census)
  - Total: 1,216
  - Density: 4.070/km^{2} (10.54/sq mi)
- Time zone: UTC-5 (PET)
- UBIGEO: 021510

Santa Rosa District is one of eleven districts of the Pallasca Province in Peru.
