= Kotosh Religious Tradition =

Buildings in the Peruvian Andes

Kotosh
- Geographical range: Huánuco, Peru
- Period: Initial Period
- Dates: c. 1,800 – 900 BCE
- Type site: Kotosh
- Preceded by: Norte Chico
- Followed by: Chavin

The Kotosh Religious Tradition is a term used by archaeologists to refer to the ritual buildings that were constructed in the mountain drainages of the Peruvian Andes between circa 3000 and c. 1800 BCE, during the Andean preceramic, or Late Archaic period of Andean history.

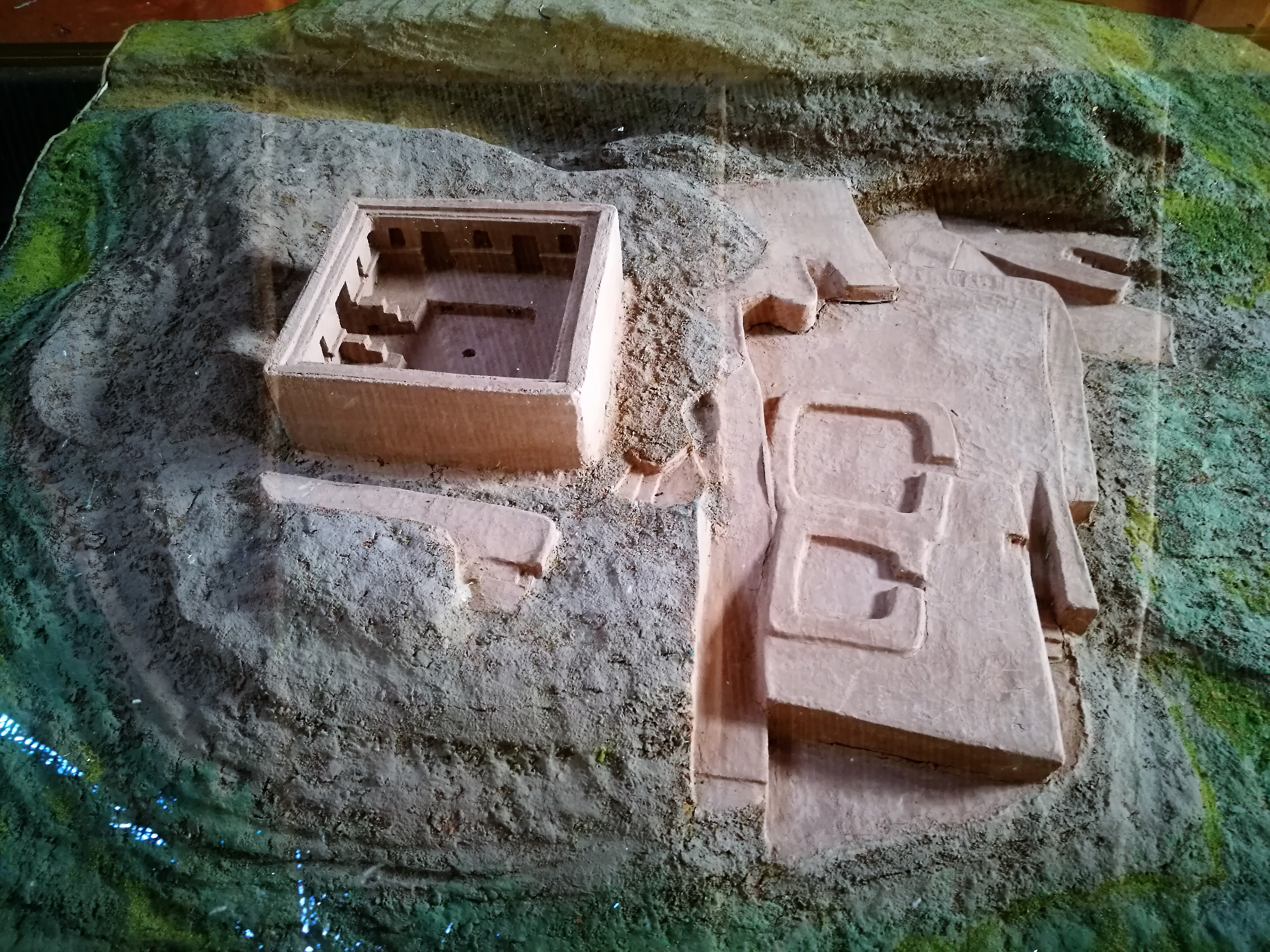
Model of the Kotosh site in the Kotosh Museum

Archaeologists have identified and excavated a number of these ritual centers; the first of these to be discovered was that at Kotosh, although since then further examples have been found at Shillacoto, Wairajirca, Huaricoto, La Galgada, Piruru, among others. These sites are all located in highland zones that are lower than the Puna, and yet there are considerable distances separating them. In spite of this, all these cases of highland preceramic public architecture are remarkably similar.

Kotosh tradition shows numerous links with the Chavín culture that emerged at most of these sites subsequently.

== Archaeological context ==
Three cultural phases which preceded the Chavín culture were identified at Kotosh, and at other related sites.

=== Mito period ===
Mito tradition was the earliest. This was a preceramic tradition. During this period, The Temple of the Crossed Hands was first built. The image of crossed arms is characteristic for the Kotosh temple iconography.

=== Wairajirca Period ===
This is when the first pottery appeared.

=== Kotosh Period ===
The Kotosh Period strongly maintained the traditions of the preceding Wairajirca Period, including the ceramic tradition. The Kotosh Period culture stratum was situated directly beneath the Chavín culture stratum.

Some Kotosh elements show links with the Chavín culture. For example; stirrup spouts, plain rocker stampings, and curvilinear ceramic designs. There are also similarities in black paint on red ceramics. Kotosh Black Polished Incised pottery is similar to Classical Chavín pottery.

== Kotosh ==
The "type site" of the Kotosh Religious Tradition is found at Kotosh, about 5 kilometres from the city of modern Huánuco in Peru. Located on the eastern side of the Andes - which is geographically known as the Ceja de Montaña - it is situated at the longitude of 76°16'30" and a latitude of 9°56' south. Sitting on one of the lower terraces of this mountainous region, it was built along the right bank of the Higueras. Named "Kotosh" by local Huallaga Quechua speakers; the term means "a heap of stones", referring to the two stony mounds at the site.

=== Archaeological investigation ===
The first archaeologist to investigate the site at Kotosh was Julio C. Tello, the "father of Peruvian archaeology", who visited it in 1935 as a part of his wider general survey of the Huallaga basin. Although he did not undertake any excavation at the site, he did collect pottery shards from the surface. Two years later, in 1937, the site was then visited by Donald Collier of the Field Museum of Natural History, although he again undertook no extensive investigation.

In 1958, the Japanese archaeologist Seiichi Izumi visited the site, accompanied by Julio Espejo Núñez of the Museo Nacional de Arqueología, Antropología e Historia del Perú and Professor Luis G. Lumberas of the San Cristóbal of Huamanga University. Following on from this visit, Izumi led a team from the University of Tokyo, Japan on an excavation of the site from 1 July to 3 October 1960, as a part of their wider Andean Research Program, which had been going on since 1958. Their findings were then published in English in 1963.

== La Galgada ==
Another prominent example of a Kotosh Religious Tradition center was that at La Galgada, located on the eastern bank of the Tablachaca River, the principal tributary of the Santa River. The site sits at a south latitude of 8°28' and a west longitude of 78°9', in what is now the Pallasca Province, Peru. Situated in the mountainous Andean region, it is at a relatively low altitude of 1,100 metres above sea level. The archaeologists who excavated at the site in the late 1970s and early 1980s decided to call the monument "La Galgada" after the nearest town, a coal-mining settlement about 2 kilometres to the north, although local people instead referred to it as "San Pedro".

The site around la Galgada was first occupied about 3000 BCE by agricultural communities who constructed small chambers that were different from their houses, presumably in which to perform ceremonial activities. It is clear from the archaeological evidence that they spent more effort in constructing the various ceremonial and mortuary monuments than in homes for themselves, an approach common to most pre-modern societies across the world. Archaeological surveys have established that during the Pre-Ceramic Period, at least 11 settlements had grown up throughout the Tablachaca Canyon, being concentrated on both sides of the river for at least 8 km near to the modern village of la Galgada. This led one of the head excavators, Terence Grieder, to comment that the La Galgada site must be seen as "one of the most important ceremonial and burial areas in a larger, well-populated district, which in Pre-ceramic terms must be considered virtually a metropolitan center".

=== Architecture ===
At the la Galgada ceremonial site, the most prominent architectural features were the North and South Mounds.

=== Archaeological investigation ===
By the 1960s, la Galgada had become a busy mining town, and the site had come under threat from looters who wanted to dig up the site in search of valuable artefacts. However, the town governor, Teodoro E. López Trelles, recognised the importance of the site for its archaeological value, and instituted measures to protect it from looters. In 1969, he gave a tour of the site to Terence Grieder of the University of Texas at Austin, who was then involved in the excavations at Patash, and who was sufficiently interested that he decided to investigate at the site following the culmination of the Patash project.

In 1976, Grieder and his fellow archaeologist Alberto Bueno Mendoza returned to the site, and after realizing that the site was Preceramic in date - far older than they had previously suspected - began to raise funds for an excavation. In 1978 this began, with the project continuing on until 1985.

== See also ==
- Asana, Peru
- Andean preceramic
- Caral-Supe civilization
