= Lake Quinuacocha (Ancash) =

Lake in Peru

Quinuacocha
- Location within Peru
- Location: Peru; Ancash Region
- Coordinates: 8°19′46″S 77°52′07″W
- Surface area: 0.381966 km^{2} (381,966 m^{2})
- Surface elevation: 4,218 m (13,839 ft)

Quinuacocha (possibly from Quechua kinwa quinoa, qucha lake, "quinoa lake") is a lake in Peru located in the Ancash Region, Pallasca Province, Conchucos District. It is situated at a height of 4,218 m (13,839 ft) comprising an area of 0.381966 km^{2} (381,966 m^{2}). Quinuacocha lies northeast of a group of lakes named Pusaccocha (Quechua for "five lakes").
