= Pusaccocha =

Group of lakes in Peru

- Location within Peru
- Location: Peru; Ancash Region
- Coordinates: 8°21′50″S 77°54′48″W

Pusaccocha, Pusac Ccocha or Pusac Cocha (possibly from Quechua pusaq eight qucha lake, "eight lakes") is a group of eight lakes in Peru located in the Ancash Region, Pallasca Province, Huandoval District. The lakes which are lying in a row from east to west are situated north of the lake Piticocha and southwest of the lake Huachumachay (possibly from Quechua Wachumach'ay).
