= Tablachaca River =

River in Peru

The Tablachaca River is located in Pallasca Province in the Republic of Peru. The lower part of the river used to be known as Chuquicara, meaning "river which reveals precious metals". Its source is in the Pelagatos Range at an altitude of 4,950m, and runs for a little over 80 km.

The archaeological site of La Galgada is located on the eastern bank of the Tablachaca.
