= Lake Llamacocha =

Lake in Peru

- Location within Peru
- Location: Peru; Ancash Region
- Coordinates: 8°15′19″S 77°49′13″W
- Surface area: 0.041169 km^{2} (41,169 m^{2})
- Surface elevation: 3,501 m (11,486 ft)

Lake Llamacocha (possibly from Quechua llama llama, qucha lake) is a lake in the Andes of Peru. It is located in the Ancash Region, Pallasca Province, Conchucos District, northeast of Conchucos. It is situated at an elevation of 3,501 m (11,486 ft) comprising an area of 0.041169 km^{2} (41,169 m^{2}).
