= T'uruqucha (Ancash) =

Lake in Peru

- Location within Peru
- Location: Peru; Ancash Region
- Coordinates: 8°18′47″S 77°43′10″W

T'uruqucha (Quechua t'uru mud, qucha lake, "mud lake", also spelled Torococha) is a lake in the Andes of Peru. It is located in the Ancash Region, Pallasca Province, Conchucos District.
