= Lake Pelagatos =

Lake in Peru

- Location within Peru
- Location: Ancash Region
- Coordinates: 8.179804°S 77.793838°W
- Basin countries: Peru

Lake Pelagatos is a lake in Peru.

== See also ==
- Challhuacocha
- List of lakes in Peru
