= Huandoval District =

Coordinates: 8.331677°S 77.9745°W

Huandoval
- District
- Interactive map of Huandoval
- Country: Peru
- Region: Ancash
- Province: Pallasca
- Founded: May 9, 1923
- Capital: Huandoval

Government
  - Mayor: Manuel Alberto Paredes Reyes

Area
  - Total: 116 km^{2} (45 sq mi)
- Elevation: 3,035 m (9,957 ft)

Population (2005 census)
  - Total: 1,174
  - Density: 10.1/km^{2} (26.2/sq mi)
- Time zone: UTC-5 (PET)
- UBIGEO: 021505

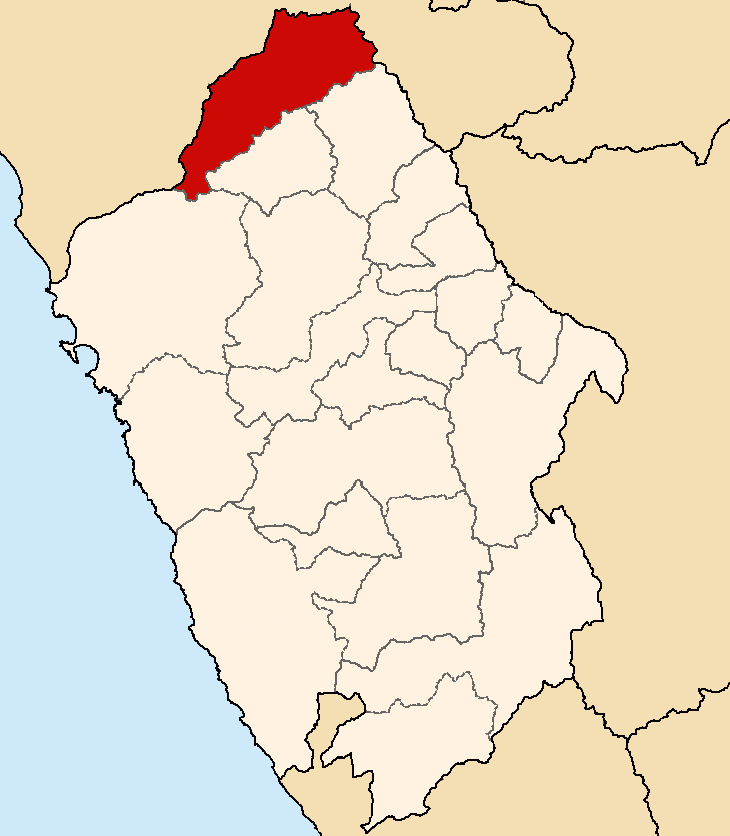

Huandoval District is one of eleven districts of the Pallasca Province in Peru.

== See also ==
- P'itiqucha
- Pusaqqucha
