= Conchucos District =

Coordinates: 8°16′01″S 77°51′00″W

Conchucos
- District
- Interactive map of Conchucos
- Country: Peru
- Region: Ancash
- Province: Pallasca
- Founded: December 16, 1918
- Capital: Conchucos

Government
  - Mayor: Teofilo Lorenzo Miranda Blas

Area
  - Total: 585.24 km^{2} (225.96 sq mi)
- Elevation: 3,180 m (10,430 ft)

Population (2005 census)
  - Total: 7,660
  - Density: 13.1/km^{2} (33.9/sq mi)
- Time zone: UTC-5 (PET)
- UBIGEO: 021503

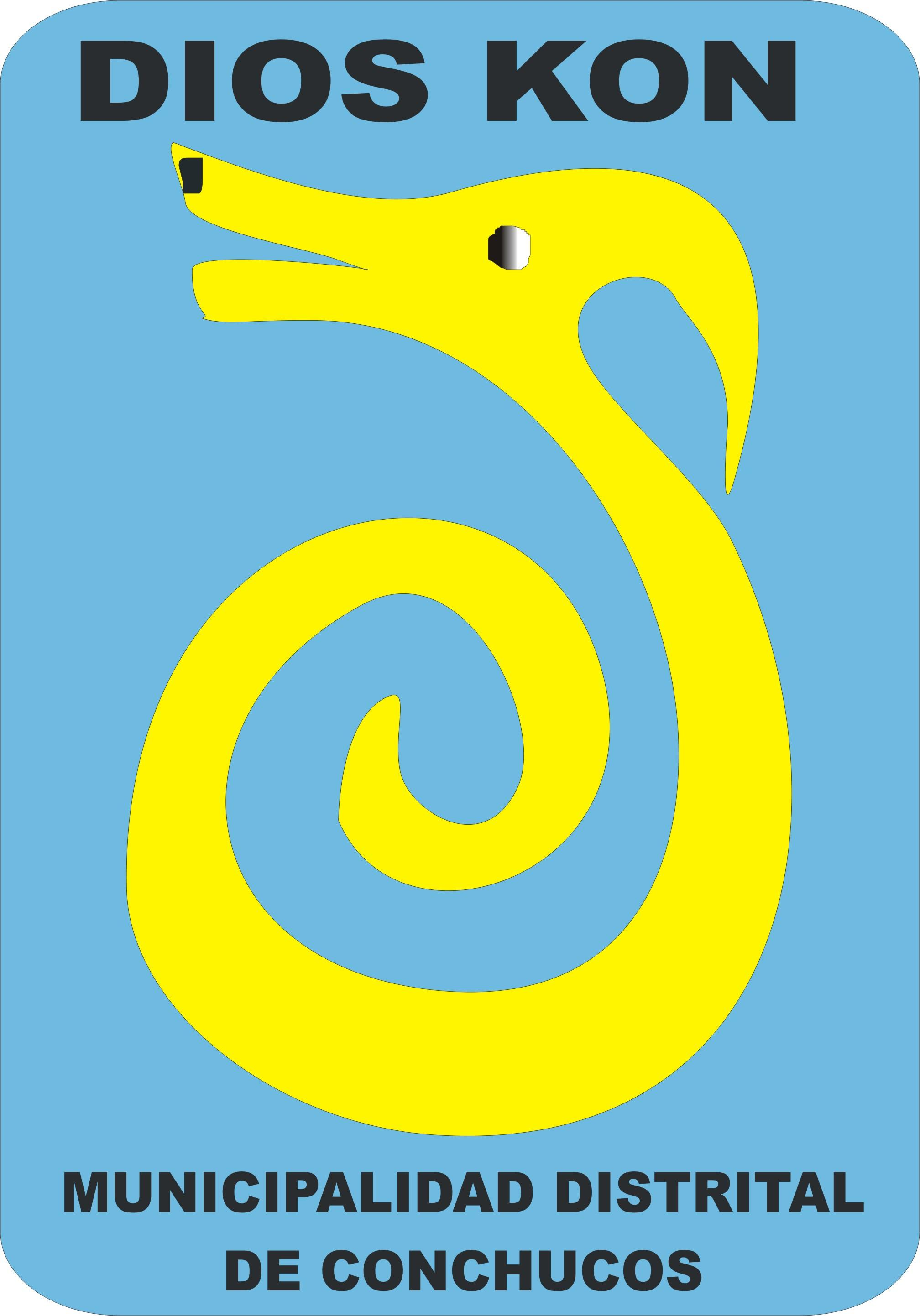
The coat of arms (escudo) of the Conchucos District in Pallasca Province, Peru

Conchucos District is one of eleven districts of the Pallasca Province in Peru.

== Geography ==
One of the highest peaks of the district is Anka Pata at approximately 4,600 m (15,100 ft). Other mountains are listed below:

- Amaru
- Hatun Hirka
- Kiswar
- Parya Chuku
- Parya Qucha
- Pillu Kunka
- Pinqullu
- Qullpa Raqra
- Sapallu
- Sinqa
- Tawlli
- Wachu Mach'ay
- Wanaku
- Wiqu Runtu
- Yuraq Yaku

Some of the lakes in the district are Challwaqucha, Kinwaqucha, Llamaqucha, Paryaqucha and T'uruqucha.

== Etymology ==
Conchucos means 'country of water' in Kulyi language (kon water, chucu country).

== See also ==
- Cordillera Blanca
