= Lacabamba District =

Coordinates: 8°16′01″S 77°54′00″W

Lacabamba
- District
- Interactive map of Lacabamba
- Country: Peru
- Region: Ancash
- Province: Pallasca
- Founded: October 3, 1942
- Capital: Lacabamba

Government
  - Mayor: Enrique Pereda Miranda

Area
  - Total: 64.68 km^{2} (24.97 sq mi)
- Elevation: 3,329 m (10,922 ft)

Population (2005 census)
  - Total: 899
  - Density: 13.9/km^{2} (36.0/sq mi)
- Time zone: UTC-5 (PET)
- UBIGEO: 021506

Lacabamba District is one of eleven districts of the Pallasca Province in Peru.
