= Pampas District, Pallasca =

Coordinates: 8°12′S 77°54′W

Pampas
- District
- Interactive map of Pampas
- Country: Peru
- Region: Ancash
- Province: Pallasca
- Founded: December 16, 1918
- Capital: Pampas

Government
  - Mayor: Marcial Castillo Valerio Chavez

Area
  - Total: 438.18 km^{2} (169.18 sq mi)
- Elevation: 3,190 m (10,470 ft)

Population (2005 census)
  - Total: 5,828
  - Density: 13.30/km^{2} (34.45/sq mi)
- Time zone: UTC-5 (PET)
- UBIGEO: 021509

Pampas District is one of eleven districts of the Pallasca Province in Peru.
