= Huacaschuque District =

Coordinates: 8°24′00″S 78°01′59″W

Huacaschuque
- District
- Interactive map of Huacaschuque
- Country: Peru
- Region: Ancash
- Province: Pallasca
- Founded: January 13, 1955
- Capital: Huacaschuque

Government
  - Mayor: Aristides Corales Gonzales

Area
  - Total: 63.59 km^{2} (24.55 sq mi)
- Elevation: 3,100 m (10,200 ft)

Population (2005 census)
  - Total: 734
  - Density: 11.5/km^{2} (29.9/sq mi)
- Time zone: UTC-5 (PET)
- UBIGEO: 021504

Huacaschuque District is one of eleven districts of the Pallasca Province in Peru.
