= Piticocha (Ancash) =

Lake in Peru

- Location within Peru
- Location: Ancash Region
- Coordinates: 8°25′55″S 77°54′58″W
- Basin countries: Peru
- Surface area: 0.916 km^{2} (916,000 m^{2})
- Surface elevation: 4,325 m (14,190 ft)

Piticocha (possibly from Quechua p'iti dividing by pulling powerfully to the extremes; gap, interruption, qucha lake, "gap lake") is a lake in Peru located in the Ancash Region, Pallasca Province, Cabana District. It is situated at a height of 4,325 m (14,190 ft) comprising an area of 0.916485 km^{2} (916,485 m^{2}).

== See also ==
- List of lakes in Peru
