= Kotosh =

Archaeological site in Peru

Coordinates: 9°55′51″S 76°16′46″W

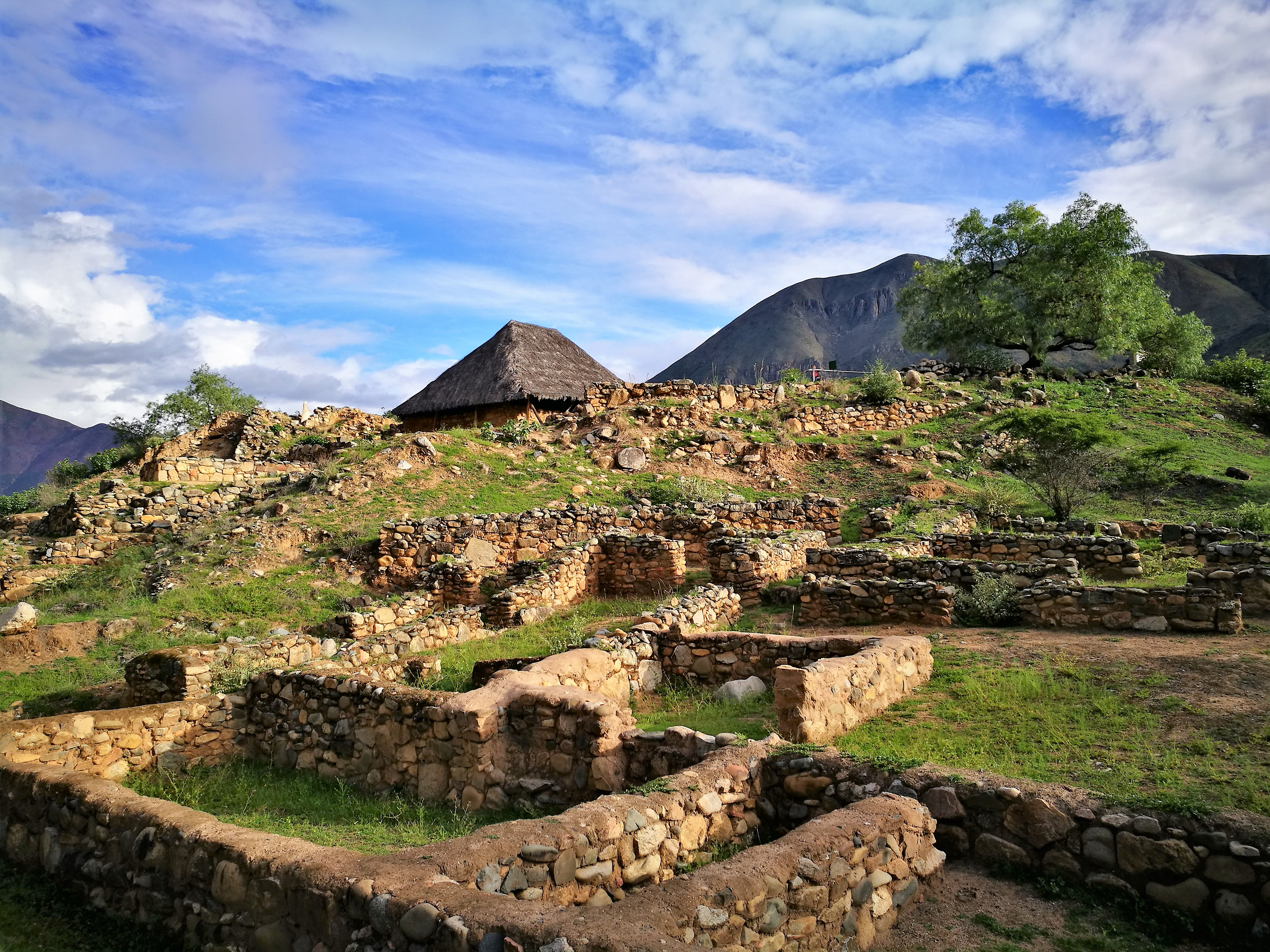
- Partial view of the site.

- Location in Peru
- Type: Settlement
- Cultures: Kotosh Religious Tradition, Chavín culture
- Location: Huánuco

Kotosh is an archaeological site near the town of Huánuco, Peru, consisting of a series of buildings comprising six periods of continuous occupation.

== Stratigraphy ==
Three cultural phases which preceded the Chavin culture were identified at Kotosh,

1. Kotosh
2. Wairajirca
3. Mito

=== Kotosh Period ===
The Kotosh Period culture stratum was situated directly beneath the Chavin culture stratum.

At this stage, maize cultivation has appeared.

Some Kotosh elements show links with the Chavin culture. For example; stirrup spouts, plain rocker stampings, and curvilinear ceramic designs. There are also similarities in black paint on red ceramics. Kotosh Black Polished Incised pottery is similar to Classical Chavin pottery.

=== Wairajirca period ===
This is when the first pottery appeared.

Wayrajirca pottery was originally found at its type site Wayrajirca, which is near Kotosh, and this pottery is also known from elsewhere in the northern highlands. The Wairajirca period continued from the late eighteenth to late twelfth century cal BC (1750-1150 BC).

The pottery is characterized by the polished brown and black styles decorated with incisions and post-firing paint. The designs are simple and geometric; anthropomorphic figures be added at later periods.

The Kotosh Period strongly maintained the traditions of the preceding Wairajirca Period, including the ceramic tradition.

Kanezaki (2021) investigated the Jancao site in the Department of Huánuco of Peru, which is also near the Kotosh site. In the neighborhood, there are also other important archaeological sites of the Formative period, such as Wairajirca and Shillacoto. According to Kanezaki, the Kotosh and Shillacoto sites were no longer occupied at the end of their preceramic phase before their Wairajirca ceramic phase started. But they were reoccupied again during the Phase III of Wairajirca chronology (1400-1500 BC).

=== Mito period ===
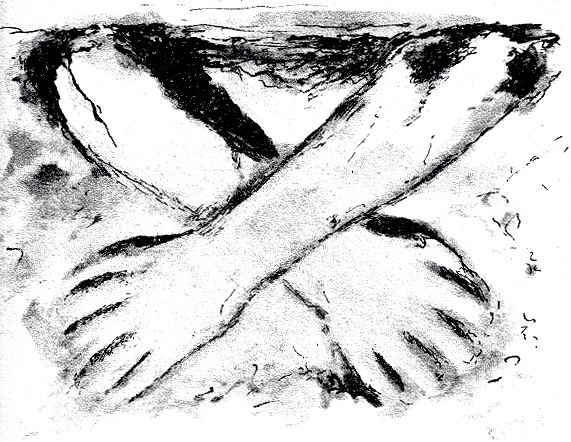
Terracota "Crossed arms" from Kotosh, 1800 BC

This was the earliest identified cultural period, which was preceramic. During this period, The Temple of the Crossed Hands was first built. The image of crossed arms is characteristic for the Kotosh temple iconography.

Some Lauricocha culture stone tools were found in this period.

== See also ==
- Andean preceramic
- Kotosh Religious Tradition
- Piruru

== Bibliography ==
- Del Busto Duthurburu, José Antonio: Perú preincaico, pp. 56–58. Colección de obras escogidas de José Antonio del Busto. Lima, Empresa Editora El Comercio S.A., 2011. ISBN 978-612-306-033-6
- Kauffmann Doig, Federico: Historia y arte del Perú antiguo. Vol. 1, pp. 136–138. Lima, Ediciones PEISA, 2002. ISBN 9972-40-213-4
- Kaulicke, Peter: El Perú Antiguo I. Los períodos arcaico y formativo, pp. 38. Colección Historia del Perú, editada por la Empresa Editora El Comercio S.A. Lima, 2010. ISBN 978-612-4069-86-4
