= Pallasca province =

Pallasca
- Province
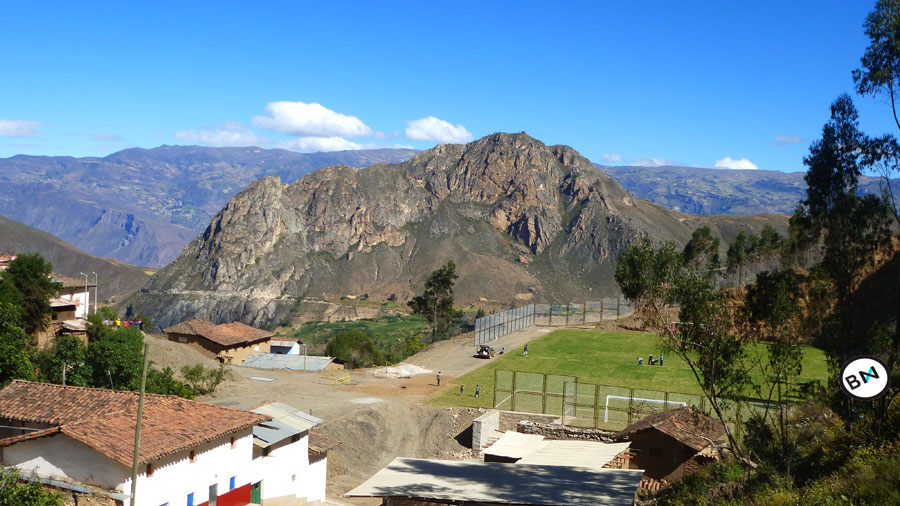
- Bolognesi District

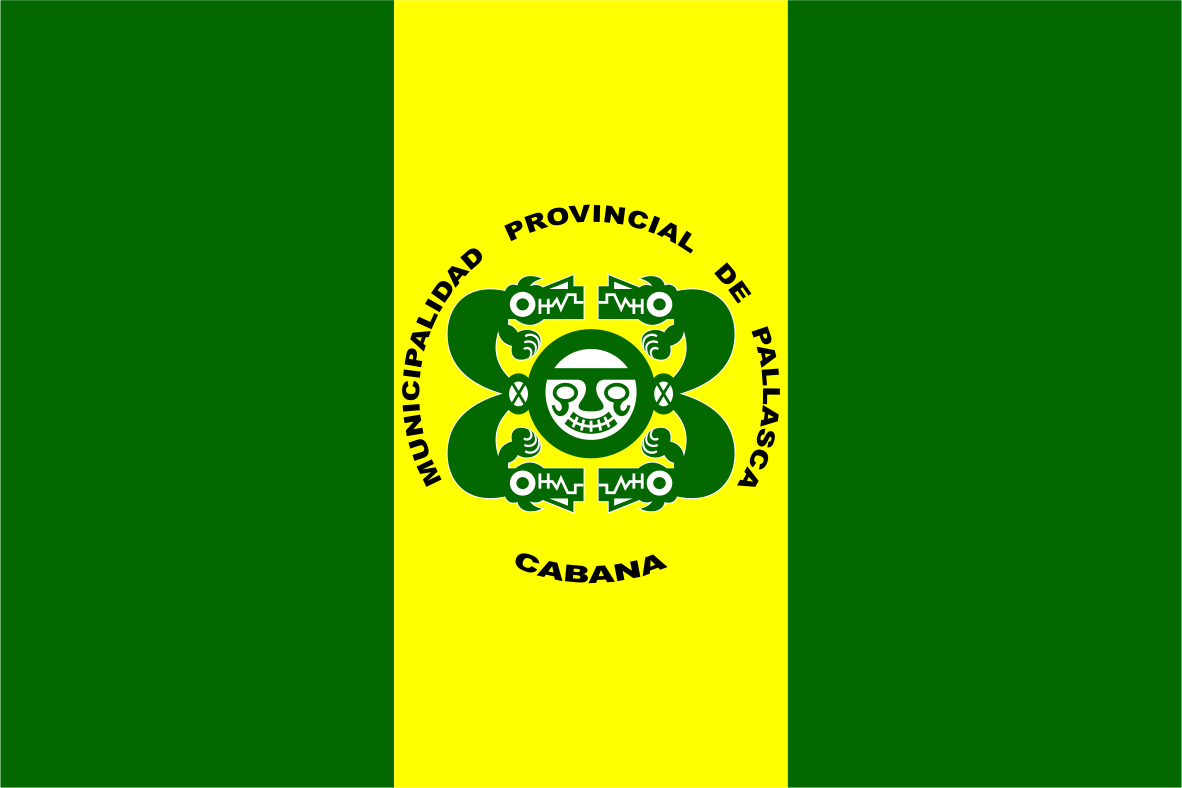
- Flag

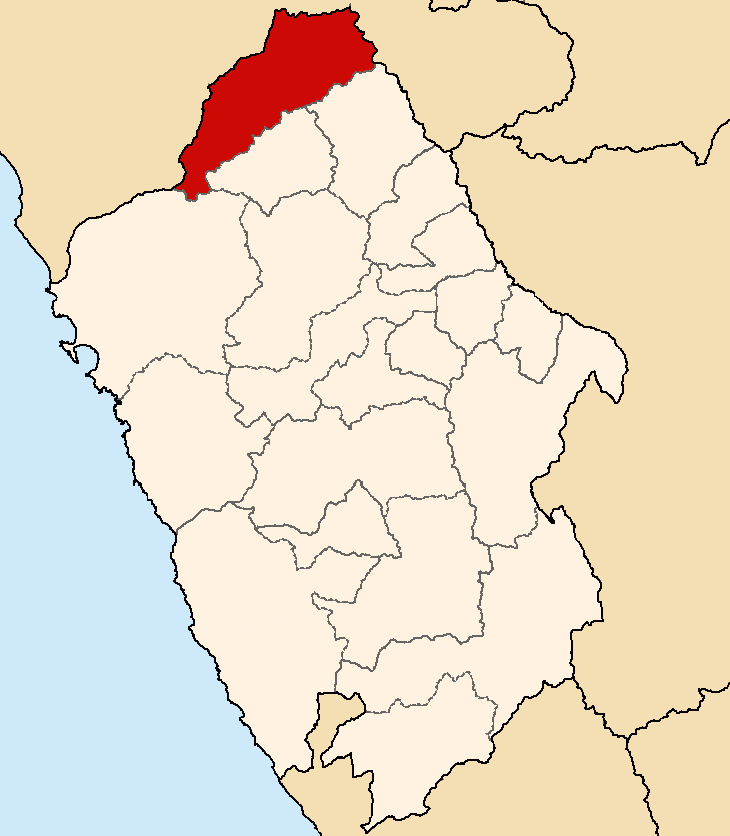
- Location of Pallasca in the Ancash Region
- Coordinates: 8°23′35″S 78°00′32″W
- Country: Peru
- Region: Ancash
- Capital: Cabana

Government
  - Mayor: José Sifuente (2011)

Area
  - Total: 2,101 km^{2} (811 sq mi)

Population
  - Total: 28,580
  - Density: 13.60/km^{2} (35.23/sq mi)
- UBIGEO: 0215

Pallasca (from Quechua Pallasqa) is one of 20 provinces of the Ancash Region in Peru.

== Geography ==
One of the highest peaks of the province is Utkhu Qucha at approximately 4,600 m (15,100 ft). Other mountains are listed below:

- Allqu Maka
- Amaru
- Chawpi Qucha
- Chunta
- Hatun Hirka
- Kiswar
- Lasu
- Llama
- Mankha Qutu
- Minas Urqu
- Parya Chuku
- Parya Qucha
- Puma Sallqa
- P'iti Qucha
- Sapallu
- Sinqa
- Tawlli
- Tuku Wayin
- Tullu Kancha
- Urqun
- Wachu Mach'ay
- Wamani
- Wanaku
- Wawra
- Wiqu Runtu
- Wira Wira
- Yuraq Yaku

Some of the lakes of the district are Challwaqucha, Kinwaqucha, Llamaqucha, Paryaqucha, Pusaqqucha, P'itiqucha, T'uruqucha and Wayq'uqucha.

== Political division ==
Pallasca is divided into eleven districts, which are:

- Bolognesi
- Cabana
- Conchucos
- Huacaschuque
- Huandoval
- Lacabamba
- Llapo
- Pallasca
- Pampas
- Santa Rosa
- Tauca
