= Tauca District =

Coordinates: 8°28′59″S 78°03′00″W

Tauca Tawqa
- District
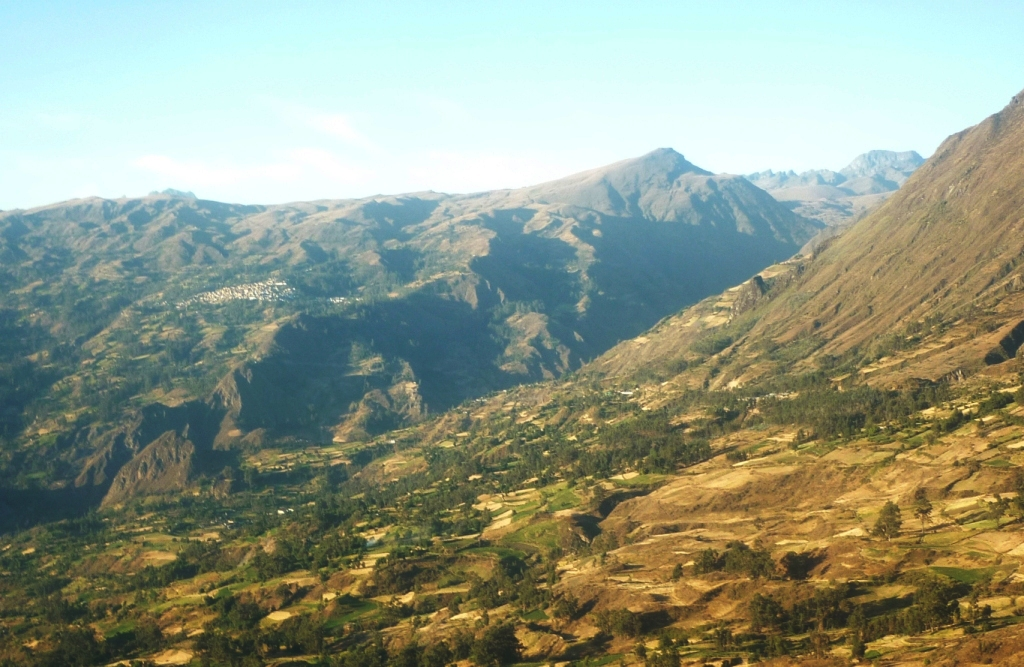
- Tauca District
- Interactive map of Tauca
- Country: Peru
- Region: Ancash
- Province: Pallasca
- Capital: Tauca

Area
  - Total: 209.12 km^{2} (80.74 sq mi)
- Elevation: 3,367 m (11,047 ft)

Population (2005 census)
  - Total: 3,313
  - Density: 15.84/km^{2} (41.03/sq mi)
- Time zone: UTC-5 (PET)
- UBIGEO: 021511

Tauca District is one of eleven districts of the Pallasca Province in Peru.
