= Archaeology of the Americas =

Study of the archaeology of North, Central and South America and the Caribbean

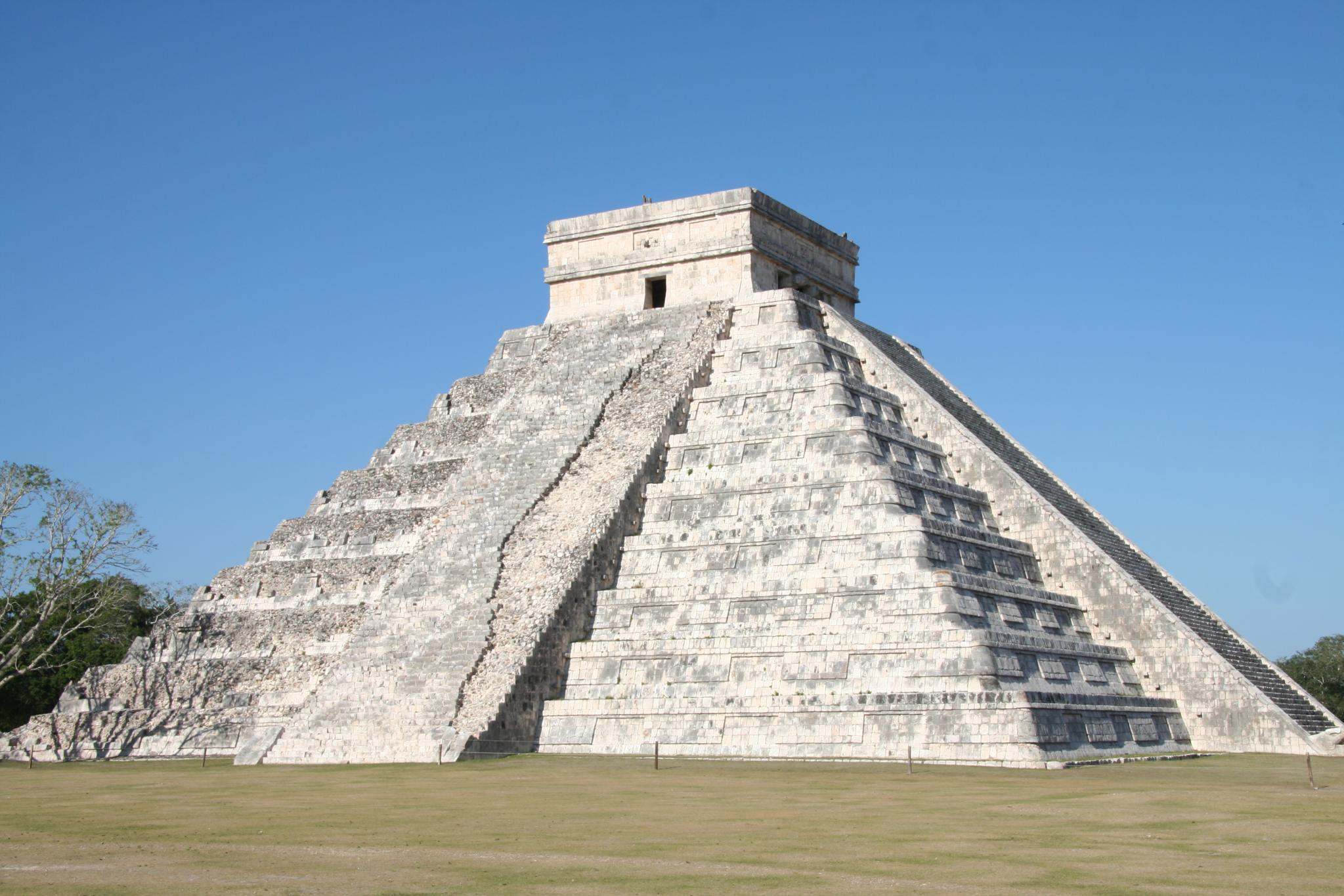
Temple of Kukulcan in Chichen Itza located on top of Kukulcan pyramid

The archaeology of the Western Hemisphere, including North America (Mesoamerica), Central America, South America and the Caribbean, includes the study of pre-historic/pre-Columbian and historic Indigenous American peoples, as well as historical archaeology of more recent eras, including the trans-Atlantic slave trade and European colonization.

== Chronology ==
The pre-Columbian era is the term generally used to encompass all time period subdivisions in the history of the Americas spanning the time from the original settlement of the Americas in the Upper Paleolithic until the European colonization of the Americas during the early modern period. While technically referring to the era before the voyages of Christopher Columbus from AD 1492 to 1504, in practice the term usually includes the history of American Indigenous cultures until the 18th or 19th century. In more recent decades, archaeological scholarship has extended to include enslaved Africans and European and Asian migrant populations.

The pre-Columbian archaeological record in the Americas has conventionally been divided into five phases based on an enduring system established by Gordon Willey and Philip Phillips's 1958 book Method and Theory in American Archaeology. Their chronology differs from old world prehistory from Europe and Asia, where the three-age system, with the Stone Age divided into Paleolithic, Mesolithic, Neolithic, and Chalcolithic, followed by the Bronze Age and Iron Age, remains in general use.

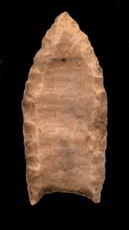
Folsom projectile point. National Park Service, c. 1961

Numerous regional and sub-regional divisions have since been defined to distinguish various cultures through time and space, as later archaeologists recognized that these generalised stages did not adequately correspond to the cultural variation that existed in different locations in the Americas.

- Lithic stage

Defined by the ostensible prevalence of big-game hunting. In most places, this can be dated to before 8000 BCE, starting most probably around 16,500 BCE (see Paleo-Indians). Examples include the Clovis culture and Folsom tradition groups.

- The Archaic stage

Defined by the increasingly intensive gathering of wild resources with the decline of the big-game hunting lifestyle. Typically, Archaic cultures can be dated from 8000 to 1000 BCE. Examples include the Archaic Southwest, the Arctic small tool tradition, the Poverty Point culture, the Dorset culture, and the Chan-Chan culture in southern Chile.

- The Formative stage

Defined as "village agriculture" based. Most of these can be dated from 1000 BCE to 500 CE. Examples include the Zapotec civilization, Mimbres culture, Olmec, Woodland, and Mississippian cultures.

- The Classic stage

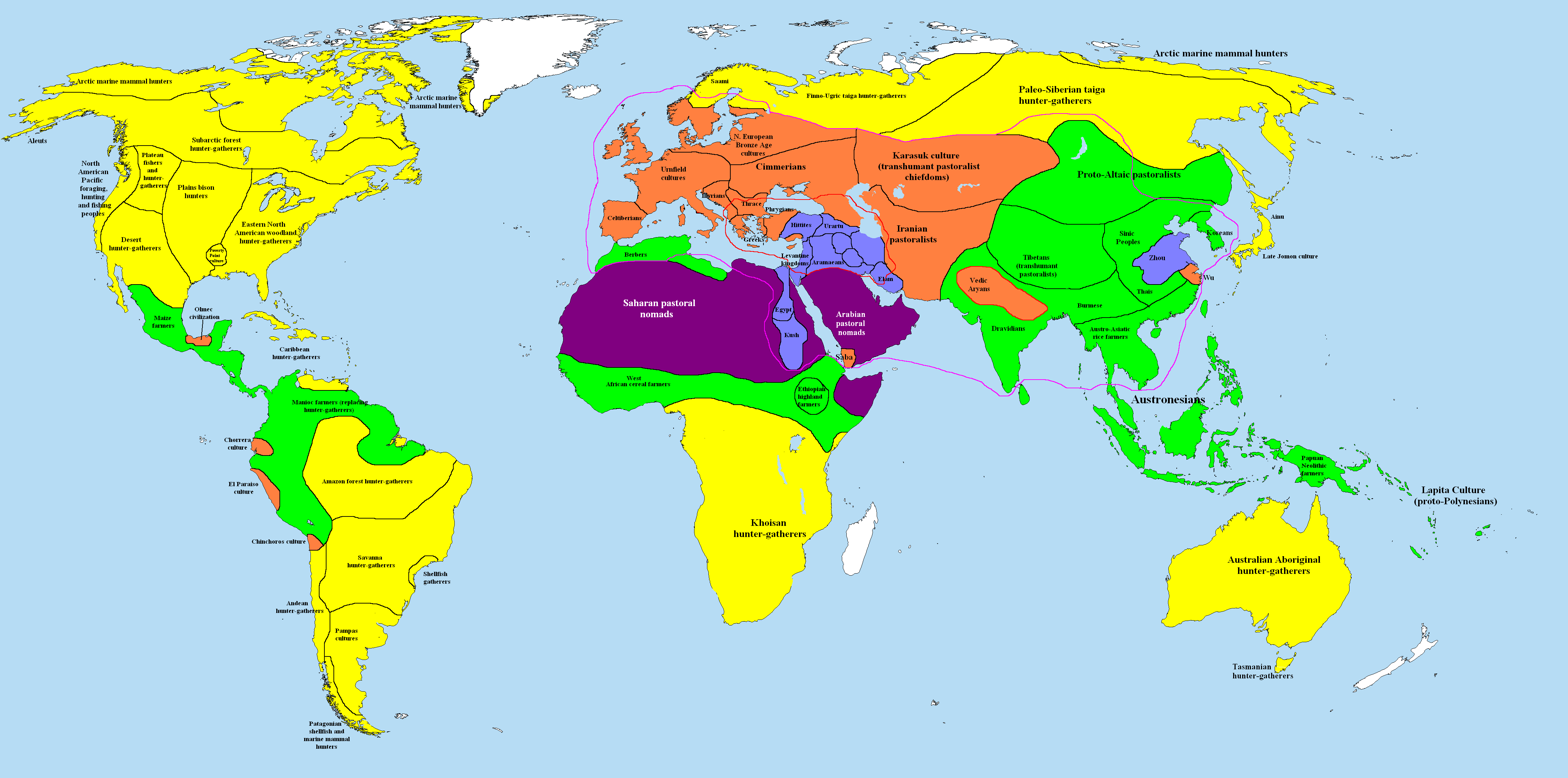
Simplified map of subsistence methods at 1000 BCE Hunter-gatherers Simple farming societies Complex farming societies (Olmecs, Chorrera) Ancient advanced states

Defined as "early civilizations", and typically dating from 500 to 1200 CE. Willey and Phillips considered only cultures from Mesoamerica and Peru to have achieved this level of complexity. Examples include the early Maya and the Toltec.

- The Post-Classic stage

Defined as "later prehispanic civilizations" and typically dated from 1200 CE until the advent of European colonisation. The late Maya, the Incan civilization, and the Aztec cultures were Post-Classic.

Today, for Meso- and Andean South America, the later periods are more often classified using the "Horizon" terminology, with "Early Horizon" typically broadly equating to the Late Formative stage. "Horizons" are periods of cultural stability and political unity, with "Intermediate periods" covering the politically fragmented transition between them. In the Andes, there are three Horizon periods, with two Intermediate periods between them. The Horizons, and their dominant cultures are: Early Horizon, Chavin; Middle Horizon, Tiwanaku and Wari culture; Late Horizon, Inca.

== Major regions ==
=== North America ===
==== NAGPRA ====
Since 1990, in the United States, physical anthropology and archaeological investigations based on the study of human remains are influenced by the Native American Graves Protection and Repatriation Act, (NAGPRA), which provides for the bodies of Native Americans and associated grave goods to be turned over to the recognized tribal body most legally affiliated with the remains; the law applies only to culturally identifiable remains and artefacts found on federally owned public land. In some cases, notably, that of Kennewick Man, these laws have been subject to close judicial scrutiny and great intellectual conflict.

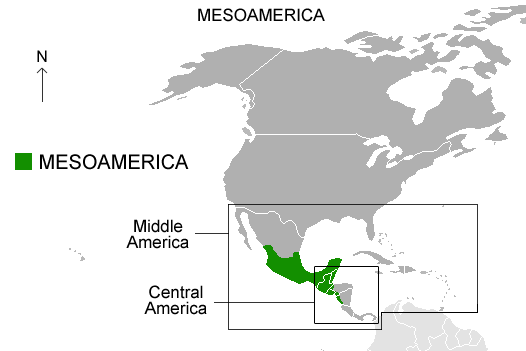
Exact location of Mesoamerica

=== Mesoamerica ===
Mesoamerica is a region and cultural area in the Americas, extending approximately from central Mexico to Honduras and Nicaragua, within which a number of pre-Columbian societies flourished before the Spanish colonization of the Americas in the 15th and 16th centuries. Prehistoric groups in this area are characterized by agricultural villages and large ceremonial and politico-religious capitals This culture area included some of the most complex and advanced cultures of the Americas, including the Olmec, Teotihuacan, the Maya, and the Aztec, the most powerful tribe of Mesoamerica in their time.

=== South America ===
Important South American societies include the Moche, the Inca, the Wari.

Important South American archaeological sites include: Chavín de Huántar, Pikillaqta, Machu Picchu, Tiwanaku, Monte Verde, and the Upano Valley sites.

=== Central America ===
Central America is a region and cultural area in the Americas located south of Mesoamerica extending from Nicaragua to the southern border of Panama. Important sites include the Stone Spheres of Costa Rica.

== Archaeogenetics ==
Molecular genetics study suggests that surviving Amerindian populations derived from a theoretical single founding population, possibly from only 50 to 70 genetic contributors. Preliminary research, restricted to only 9 genomic regions (or loci) have shown a genetic link between original Americas and Asia populations. The study does not address the question of separate migrations for these groups, and excludes other DNA data-sets.

The American Journal of Human Genetics released an article in 2007 stating, "Here we show, by using 86 complete mitochondrial genomes, that all Indigenous American haplogroups, including Haplogroup X (mtDNA), were part of a single founding population." Amerindian groups in the Bering Strait region exhibit perhaps the strongest DNA or mitochondrial DNA relations to Siberian peoples. The genetic diversity of Amerindian Indigenous groups increase with distance from the assumed entry point into the Americas. Certain genetic diversity patterns from West to East suggest at least some coastal migration events. Geneticists have variously estimated that peoples of Asia and the Americas were part of the same population from 42,000 to 21,000 years ago.

== Archaeological finds ==
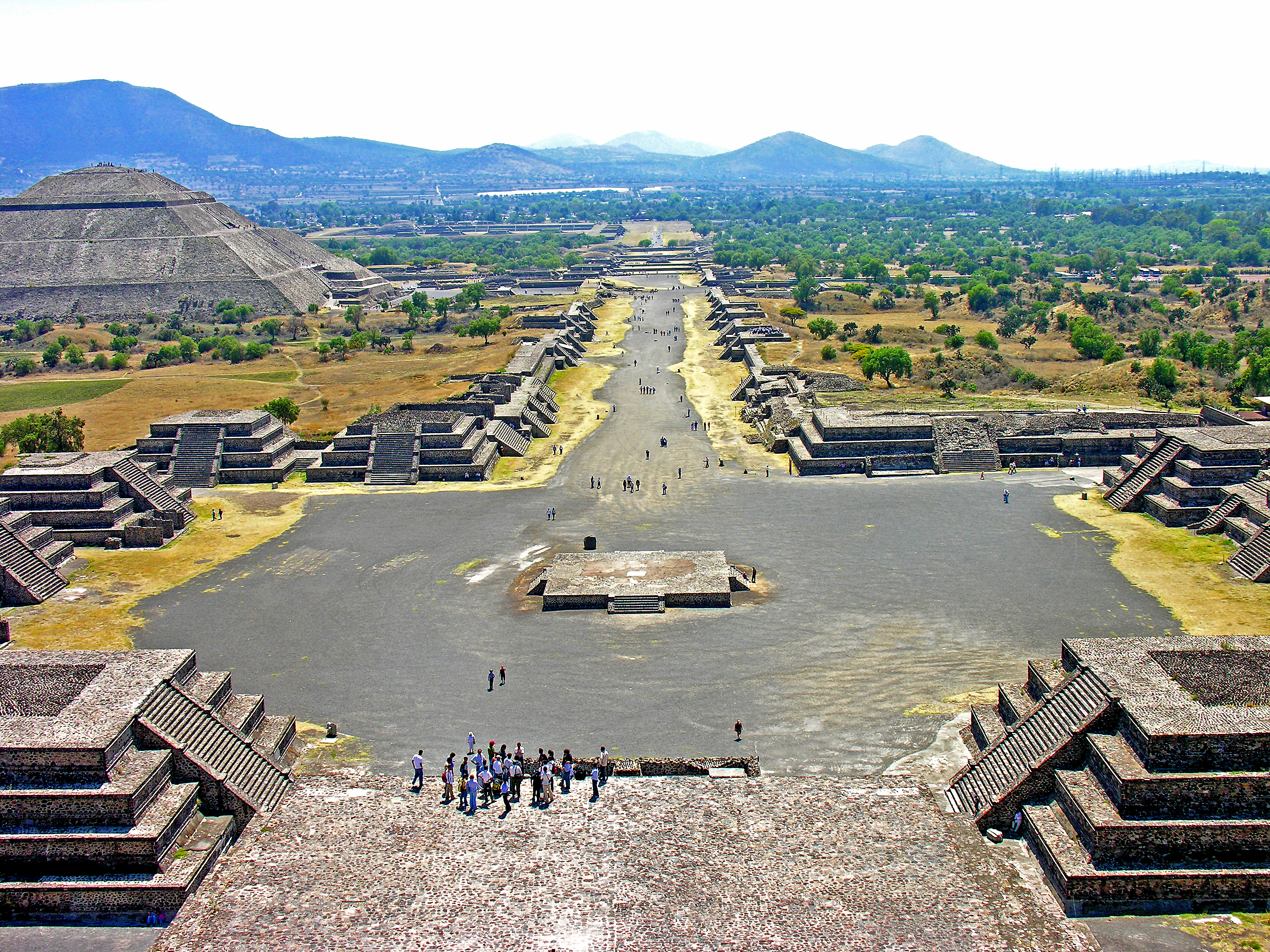
The Avenue of the Dead in Teotihuacan

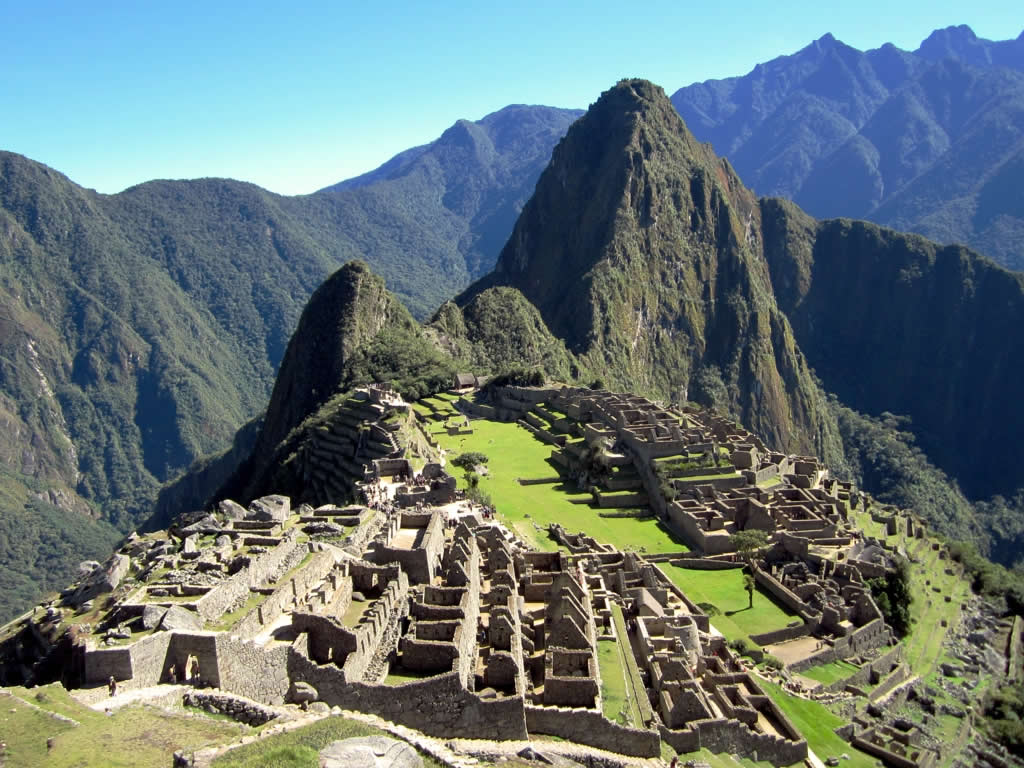
The iconic Machu Picchu, symbol of the Inca civilization

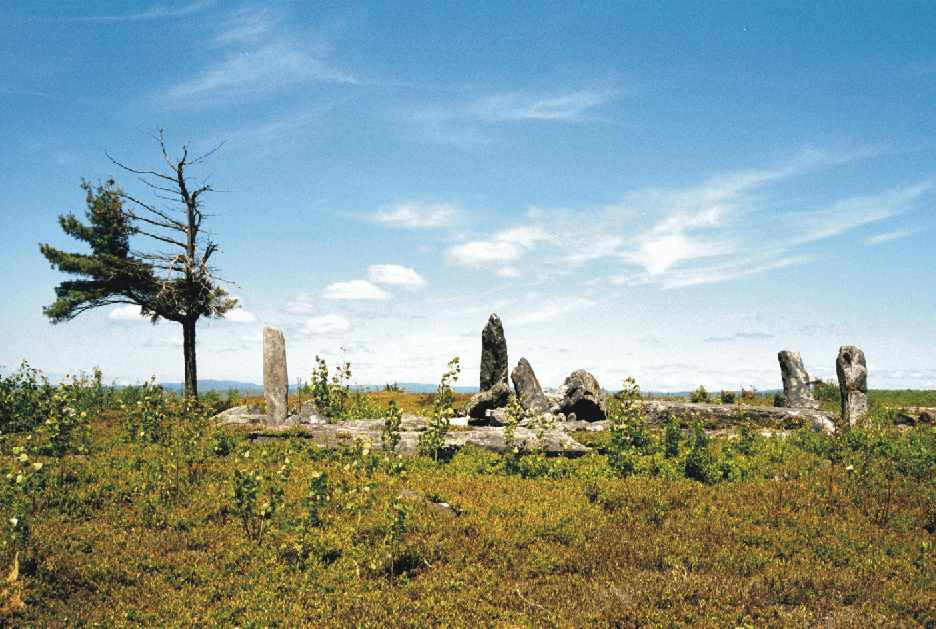
Burnt Hill Stone Circle, Heath, Massachusetts, United States

In February 2021, archaeologists from the University of Buenos Aires–National Scientific and Technical Research Council announced the discovery of 12 graves dated to 6,000–1,300 years ago in Argentine Northwest. Researchers also revealed necklaces and pendants next to some of the bodies. According to archaeologist Leticia Cortés, there were many kinds of burial methods, in individual or collective graves, and also in the posture of the bodies. Some were hyperflexed, like squatting, with the shoulders touching the knees.

In 2018, 9000-year-old remains of a female hunter along with a toolkit of projectile points and animal processing implements were discovered at the Andean site of Wilamaya Patjxa, Puno District in Peru.

In September 2021, archaeologists announced the remains of eight 800-year-old bodies nearby ancient town of Chilca. Bodies included adults and children who were covered in plant material before being buried. Some dishes and musical instruments were uncovered as well. Researchers think remains belong to the Chilca culture, which was apart from other pre-Hispanic cultures in the area.

A mummy that is approximately 800 years old that is believed to be of pre-Inca cultures was found at the site of Cajamarquilla in Peru in November 2021. Researchers reported that the mummy was tied with strings, covering his face with his hands, so they assumed it was a southern Peruvian funeral custom. In February 2022, archaeologists announced the discovery of six mummified children thought to have been sacrificed, probably to accompany a dead elite man to the afterlife. According to archaeologist Pieter Van Dalen, 1,000-1,200 years old mummies were probably relatives and placed one above the other in different parts of the tomb.

In May 2022, archaeologists reported the discovery of 1,400-year-old remains of the Mayan site so-called Xiol on the outskirts of Mérida. They also uncovered a large central plaza and at least 12 buildings, workshops, burial places of adults and children, and an altar that served a ritual purpose.

In June 2022, archaeologists from the Mexico's National Institute of Anthropology and History (INAH) announced the discovery of a 1,300-year-old nine-inch-tall plaster head statue indicating a young Hun Hunahpu, the Maya's mythological maize god. The figure's semi-shaved haircut that resembles ripe corn gives reason to the possibility that it is a young maize god. Researchers assume that the Mayan inhabitants of Palenque possibly placed a large stone statuette over a pond to represent the entrance to the underworld. According to archaeologist Arnoldo González Cruz, the Mayan people symbolically shuttered the pool by breaking up some of the plaster and filling it with animal remains, including pottery fragments, carved bone remains, shells, obsidian arrowheads, beads, vegetables, and others.

In May 2025, archaeologists uncovered a 5,000-year-old fire altar at the Era de Pando site in Peru's Supe Valley, part of the Caral Archaeological Zone, revealing new insights into the ceremonial practices of the Caral–Supe civilization. The altar, located within a pyramidal structure known as Building C1, measures approximately 7 meters in diameter and is preceded by a rectangular courtyard, suggesting its role in elite ritual activities involving offerings such as beads, quartz fragments, fish, mollusks, and agricultural produce.

In May 2025, a joint archaeological mission from Slovakia's Comenius University and the Guatemalan Ministry of Culture and Sports identified a large Mayan urban complex in the Petén jungle of northern Guatemala. Primarily dated to the Middle Preclassic period, the site consists of an "urban triangle" formed by three distinct centers: Los Abuelos, Petnal, and Cambrayal. Covering an area of approximately six square miles, the complex represents an early example of sophisticated architectural planning and socio-political organization in the Maya lowlands.

In July 2025, a prehistoric urban center named Peñico, dating back approximately 3,500 years, was identified in northern Peru by a team of Peruvian and international archaeologists. Located approximately 600 m above sea level, the site consists of 18 structures including a circular ceremonial plaza, temples, and residential buildings constructed between 1800 and 1500 BC. According to the archaeologists, the settlement demonstrates that early Andean societies engaged in complex societal organization, serving as a cultural bridge between coastal and Amazonian communities during the early Formative stage.

In July, 2025, a pre-Incan tomb dating back around 1,000 years, attributed to the Chancay culture was discovered in the Puente Piedra district of Lima, Peru. The burial contained a body wrapped in a torn funerary bundle, seated with legs drawn in, accompanied by four clay vessels and three pumpkin-shell artifacts. A similar grave, found nearby just two meters from a home’s entrance, contained the remains of a man wrapped in burial cloths alongside pottery, suggesting the presence of a broader burial complex.

In July 2025, archaeologists from the National Institute of Anthropology and History (INAH) uncovered a pre-Hispanic mortuary cave within the Ocampo Natural Protected Area in Coahuila, Mexico. The discovery was made following reports of looting in the mountainous region, leading researchers to a vertical shaft approximately 50 centimeters wide. The subterranean chamber contained the skeletal remains of at least 17 individuals, including men, women, and 12 complete skulls, five of which belonged to children. The site is attributed to nomadic desert cultures of the Aridoamerica region and is estimated to be at least 500 years old. In addition to human remains, the team recovered 15 textile fragments, as well as remnants of baskets and mats, suggesting the deceased were originally interred in mortuary bundles.

In July 2025, archaeologists in Lima, uncovered an ancient pre-Hispanic grave beneath a residential street in the Carabayllo district. The burial, which dates back approximately 800 to 1,000 years, is attributed to the Ichma culture, a society that flourished on the central coast of Peru before the expansion of the Inca Empire. The site contained the remains of an individual interred in a seated position, wrapped in traditional funerary fabrics known as fardos. Alongside the human remains, researchers recovered several artifacts, including ceramic vessels and wooden tools, which were placed as funerary offerings.

In October 2025, archaeologists from the National Institute of Anthropology and History (INAH) announced the discovery of a pre-Hispanic urban center, or "lost city," on the Costa Chica of Guerrero, Mexico. Researchers have identified architectural features and ceramic fragments that suggest the site was occupied during the Epiclassic period, a time of a cultural transition following the decline of Teotihuacán.Among the artifacts recovered were stone carvings with anthropomorphic features and evidence of a complex hydraulic system designed to manage the region’s water resources.

In January 2026, the Metropolitan Institute of Heritage (IMP) of Quito announced the discovery of an extensive pre-Hispanic archaeological landscape in the Andean Chocó region of Ecuador. The findings were the result of a LiDAR survey conducted in December 2025.The survey identified more than 200 mounds and 100 terraces across an area of approximately 600 hectares. Prior to the use of LiDAR technology, traditional ground surveys had recorded 40 mounds and 10 terraces in the same vicinity.

In January 2026, a well-preserved 1,400-year-old Zapotec tomb was discovered in Oaxaca during an investigation by the National Institute of Anthropology and History (INAH). There is a large frieze of an owl head decorating the entrance to the burial chamber, with the bird's beak curving over the painted stucco face of a Zapotec lord, symbolizing the connection between the deceased and the underworld. The interior contains rare polychrome murals depicting a procession of figures carrying bags of copal, along with stone-carved guardians at the threshold.

In February 2026, archaeologists from the San Marcos National University identified a 4,000-year-old polychrome mural at the Los Corrales site in Peru's Supe Valley. The mural, which dates to the Formative period, depicts complex iconographic figures, including an anthropomorphic character associated with agricultural fertility and celestial cycles.

In February 2026, archaeologists from the Templo Mayor Project (PTM) in Mexico City announced the discovery of a colossal Mexica offering dating to the reign of Motecuhzoma Ilhuicamina. The discovery involves three newly identified ritual deposits (Offerings 186, 187, and 189) that mirror three others found in previous decades. The chests contained 83 greenstone figurines carved in the Mezcala style. These 1,000-year-old relics were captured as war plender from the northern highlands of Guerrero following Mexica military conquests and were ritually re-consecrated with facial paint associated with the rain god Tlaloc. The deposits also yielded over 4,000 marine elements, including shells and snails from the Atlantic coast.

In February 2026, the Chicama Archaeological Program announced several monumental discoveries including a massive two-kilometer-long geoglyph, a ceremonial temple, and a 100-hectare agricultural complex in Peru's Chicama Valley.

In February 2026, a petroglyph was discovered in the Quebrada Seca area of Monagas state, Venezuela, and is estimated to date between 4,000 and 8,000 years ago, potentially making it one of the oldest examples of rock art in eastern Venezuela. The engraved stone features spirals, concentric circles, and anthropomorphic figures interpreted as reflecting the cosmological beliefs of early Indigenous populations, including connections to the sun, water cycles, and ancestral spirits.

In February 2026, archaeologists uncovered an elite tomb dating to between 800 and 1000 CE at the El Caño archaeological site in Coclé Province, Panama. The burial contained the remains of a high-status individual surrounded by gold ornaments including bracelets, earrings, and pectoral plates as well as finely crafted ceramic vessels. The arrangement of grave goods indicates clear social stratification, with gold objects symbolizing rank and identity within the community. The tomb is part of a larger necropolis used over approximately 200 years.

In March 2026, underwater archaeologists in Mexico announced the discovery of a prehistoric human skeleton in a submerged cave system on the Yucatán Peninsula, between Tulum and Playa del Carmen, which likely represents an 8,000-year-old burial site. The deliberate positioning of the bones on a sediment dune in a narrow passage suggests a formal funerary deposit or ritual burial rather than an accidental death.

In March 2026, study published in PNAS Nexus analyzes 140 radiocarbon dates from 136 well-preserved organic weapons to investigate the transition from atlatl-and-dart systems to bow-and-arrow technology in western North America. The results indicate that the bow and arrow first emerged around 1,400 years before present in both northern and southern regions, representing a major technological shift in prehistoric hunting practices. However, the adoption process varied geographically, with differences in the speed and extent of replacement reflecting regional ecological and cultural factors.

In March 2026, interdisciplinary study combining archaeogenetics, isotopic analysis, and archaeology reconstructs over 2,000 years of population history in the Uspallata Valley of the southern Andes in Argentina. The research reveals strong genetic continuity among local populations despite cultural and economic changes, including the adoption of agriculture. At the same time, evidence points to periods of crisis such as environmental stress and social transformations that prompted shifts in mobility, subsistence strategies, and interactions with neighboring regions. The findings highlight the resilience and adaptability of Southern Andean communities, demonstrating how they maintained stable population structures while responding dynamically to changing ecological and social conditions long before the expansion of the Inca.

In March 2026, archaeologists excavating near the Alamo Church in San Antonio, Texas, uncovered a well-preserved bronze cannonball dating to the 1836 Battle of the Alamo or the preceding siege. The four-pound projectile was found approximately one meter below ground in a stratified deposit, allowing researchers to securely date it to the period of the conflict. Its bronze composition suggests it was most likely fired by Mexican forces, as Texan defenders typically used iron ammunition. The discovery, made just before the 190th anniversary of the battle, is part of ongoing archaeological investigations at the site and is accompanied by additional finds such as explosive shot fragments.

In March 2026, archaeologists excavating at Tetlatlahuca in Tlaxcala, Mexico, uncovered two high-relief stucco sculptures dating to the Epiclassic period (c. 650–900 CE), both of which had been decapitated. The figures were likely part of a ceremonial or architectural complex and appear to have been deliberately mutilated as part of broader sociopolitical transformations in the region. Such acts are interpreted as symbolic attempts to erase or replace earlier authority, reflecting shifts in power, ideology, or ruling groups during a period of regional instability.

In April 2026, archaeologists from Mexico's National Institute of Anthropology and History (INAH) announced the recovery of a significant stone sculpture depicting the maize god in San Damián Texoloc, Tlaxcala. The sculpture, carved from basalt, stands approximately 29 centimeters high and weighs about 30 kilograms. It depicts the head of a young figure with features associated with maize deities, including an elongated skull, almond-shaped eyes, a broad nose, and full lips. Dated to the Epiclassic period (AD 600–900), the piece is linked to the Olmeca-Xicalanca culture, which rose to prominence in the region following the collapse of Teotihuacán.

In April 2026, researchers from the Caral Archaeological Zone, led by Ruth Shady Solís, announced the discovery of a structure at the coastal site of Áspero (Supe Puerto, Peru) that appears to have served as an astronomical observation point for the Caral civilization (c. 3000–1800 BC). Located in Sector J1, the structure evolved through several construction phases. Its most notable features include a circular platform (over three meters wide) with a central standing stone, known as a huanca, followed by a double-stepped platform with a central rectangular stone and an adjacent hearth. Researchers believe the structure allowed inhabitants to track the movements of the Sun, Moon, and stars.

In April 2026, the National Institute of Anthropology and History (INAH) in Mexico provided an update on the submerged artifacts recovered from the Síis Já cenote in Valladolid, Yucatán, which serves as a rare archaeological record of the 19th-century Caste War (1847–1901). Archaeologists have logged over 150 firearms on the cenote floor, primarily Spanish and English rifles and muskets.

In April 2026, the National Institute of Anthropology and History (INAH) announced the preservation and excavation of an early Maya ball court near Poxilá, Yucatán, discovered during construction for the Maya Train project. The ball court dates to the Middle Preclassic period (800–300 BC).

In May 2026, archaeologists excavating Kuélap, Peru uncovered a stone funerary structure containing the remains of five individuals, including four adults and one infant, together with a range of ceremonial offerings. The recovered materials included a Regional Inca-style phytomorphic paccha, carved bone artifacts, metal objects, stone mortars, and fragments of Spondylus shell. Researchers dated the context to the Late Horizon period (c. 1470–1532 CE) and interpreted the findings as evidence of funerary and ritual practices associated with the Chachapoyas region during the final centuries before the Spanish conquest.

In May 2026, archaeologists studying animal remains animal remains from Castillo de Huarmey identified the first physical evidence of Peruvian hairless dogs at a site associated with the Wari Empire. Researchers recovered skeletal remains, including a naturally mummified dog skull with preserved skin and traces of red cinnabar pigment, and identified at least three individuals displaying characteristics associated with the breed. Several dogs were found in association with elite burials and ceremonial contexts, including one puppy buried with an elite artisan known as the “Master Basketmaker.” Isotopic analysis indicated that some of the dogs received distinct diets and care compared to other animals at the site. Archaeologists suggested that the dogs may have functioned as companions, ritual offerings, or spiritual guides in funerary practices, reflecting their role in Wari social and ceremonial life.

In July 2026, archaeologists studying a charcoal mural discovered within Substructure II C of Structure II at the ancient Maya city of Calakmul, Mexico, identified the earliest known evidence of Maya calendrical writing, dating to approximately 400–200 BCE. The mural depicts the mythological hero Juun Ajaw hunting a creature emerging from the water and includes a calendrical glyph representing a day in the 260-day ritual calendar (Tzolk'in). Researchers interpreted the inscription as evidence that calendrical notation formed part of Maya religious and mythological imagery during the Preclassic period, providing new information on the early development of Maya writing and timekeeping traditions.

== See also ==
- Borax Lake Site
- Calico Early Man Site
- Cueva de las Manos
- Cultural periods of Peru
- Guitarrero Cave
- History of the Americas
- Indigenous peoples of the Americas
- La Jolla complex
- List of pre-Columbian civilizations
- List of Mesoamerican pyramids
- Luzia Woman
- Mesoamerican chronology
- Mummy Cave
- Pecos Classification
- Post Pattern
- Pre-Columbian South America
- Prehistoric Southwestern cultural divisions
- San Dieguito complex
- San Lorenzo Tenochtitlán
- South American Indigenous peoples
