= Marpa =

Marpa may refer to:

- Marpa Lotsawa (1012–1097), Tibetan Buddhist teacher credited with the transmission of many Buddhist teachings to Tibet from India
- Marpa, Peru, ruins of a pre-Columbian town located along the Cotahuasi Canyon in the Andes range of southern Peru
- MARPA, Modification and Replacement Parts Association
- Mini-automatic radar plotting aid
- Earley parser, one variant of which is the Marpa parser
