= Wari Empire =

Pre-columbian state in Peru (6th–11th centuries)

- 6th century–11th century
- Expansion and area of cultural influence
- Capital: Huari
- Common languages: Aymara, others
- Religion: Staff God
- Historical era: Middle Horizon
  - Established: 6th century
  - Disestablished: 11th century
Preceded by
Wari culture
Tiwanaku Empire
Succeeded by
Kingdom of Cusco
Kingdom of Chimor
Aymara kingdoms
- Today part of: Peru

The Wari Empire or Huari Empire was a political formation that emerged in around 600 CE in Peru's Ayacucho Basin and grew to cover much of coastal and highland Peru. The empire lasted for about 500 years, until 1100 CE. It existed during the same era as the Tiwanaku culture, and at one time, was thought to have been derived from it.

In 2008, archeologists found a pre-Columbian city, the Northern Wari ruins (also called Cerro Pátapo) near modern Chiclayo. The find was the first extensive settlement related to the Wari culture discovered that far north. Archaeological discoveries have continued over the past decade. In 2023, archaeologists discovered a 1200-year-old Wari ritual complex in Arequipa. While more discoveries are being made regarding the Wari Empire, archaeologists are able to draw more conclusions about the Wari Empire's culture.

== History ==
The Wari Empire was a second-generation state of the Andean region; both it and Tiwanaku had been preceded by the first-generation Moche state. When expanding to engulf new polities, the Wari Empire practiced a policy of allowing the local leaders of the newly acquired territory to retain control of their area if they agreed to join the Wari Empire and obey the Wari.

The political relationship between the Wari and Tiwanaku has been compared by archaeologist Joyce Marcus to that of the United States and the Soviet Union during the Cold War - the two empires did not go to war with one another for fear of mutual destruction. The two empires met at Moquegua, where the Wari and Tiwanaku populations co-existed without conflicts.

According to Luis Lumbreras, the Wari "constituted a synthesis of the advances that the Andean culture had achieved up to the sixth century, both in the north and south. Multiple currents converged in a territory where receptivity was very great. This was so because of a lack of elite traditions strong enough to reject innovations; on the other hand, Wari welcomed innovations that favored the advance of their projects of conquest and expansion."

== Administration ==
While the Wari likely had significant organizational and administrative power, it remains unclear what the origins of its political and artistic forms were. Emerging evidence suggests that rather than being the result of Tiwanaku traits diffusing north, the Wari and Tiwanaku ideological formations may be traceable to previous developments at Pukara, an Early Intermediate Period culture to the north of Lake Titicaca. The polity seems to have survived until ca. AD 1100, when it collapsed, likely as a result of both environmental change and internal socio-political stresses.

The expanding state likely had a fairly symbiotic relationship with local people. The colonizers would likely trade, intermarry, feast, partake in religious rituals, or just directly coerce local residents. There was also likely a wide variety of impacts from community to community, some were largely impacted by the state and others less so, depending on location and time. Contact with the larger empire could have been beneficial for smaller communities because they were able to establish trade and obtain exotic goods not previously available to them.

One of the commodities was beer, communal consumption of beer served as a potent instrument of Wari governance. Forging hierarchical ties within and between groups was often a prevalent theme in Wari feasting. At Quilcapampa, guests partaking in Wari-related feasts were served alcohol infused with vilca. The vilca-infused brew fostered collective, psychotropic experiences. The providers of the brew, Wari leaders, reinforced their elevated status within the social hierarchy. The presence of alcoholic beverages, evidenced by the abundance of maize and molle at Wari sites, indicates their widespread consumption during feasts.

The empire established long-distance exchange networks to obtain hallucinogens. To connect the highland capital and Pacific coast, the Wari constructed an imperial highway. Going through the Sondondo Valley, the highway connected three imperial sites.

With the tremendous amount of effort required to obtain the drug, it hints that vilca was an important part of the Wari political economy.

Notably, the earliest known quipus—Andean knotted-cord records—date to the first millennium CE and are attributable to the Wari, having been found at sites such as Castillo de Huarmey. While quipus are known to have played a major role in the administration of the Inca Empire, their role among the Wari is not yet fully understood.

== Infrastructure ==
Scholars, such as William Isbell, Katherine Schreiber and Luis Lumbreras consider the Wari an Empire largely due to their infrastructure. They note its construction of an extensive network of roadways linking provincial cities, as well as the construction of complex, characteristic architecture in its major centres, some of which were quite extensive. Leaders had to plan projects and organize large amounts of labor to accomplish such projects. At the Wari colony, Pikillacta, irrigation canals and terraces were built. The irrigation canals and terraces served to moved water throughout the colony, allowing the colony to utilize agriculture.

== Warfare and imperialism ==
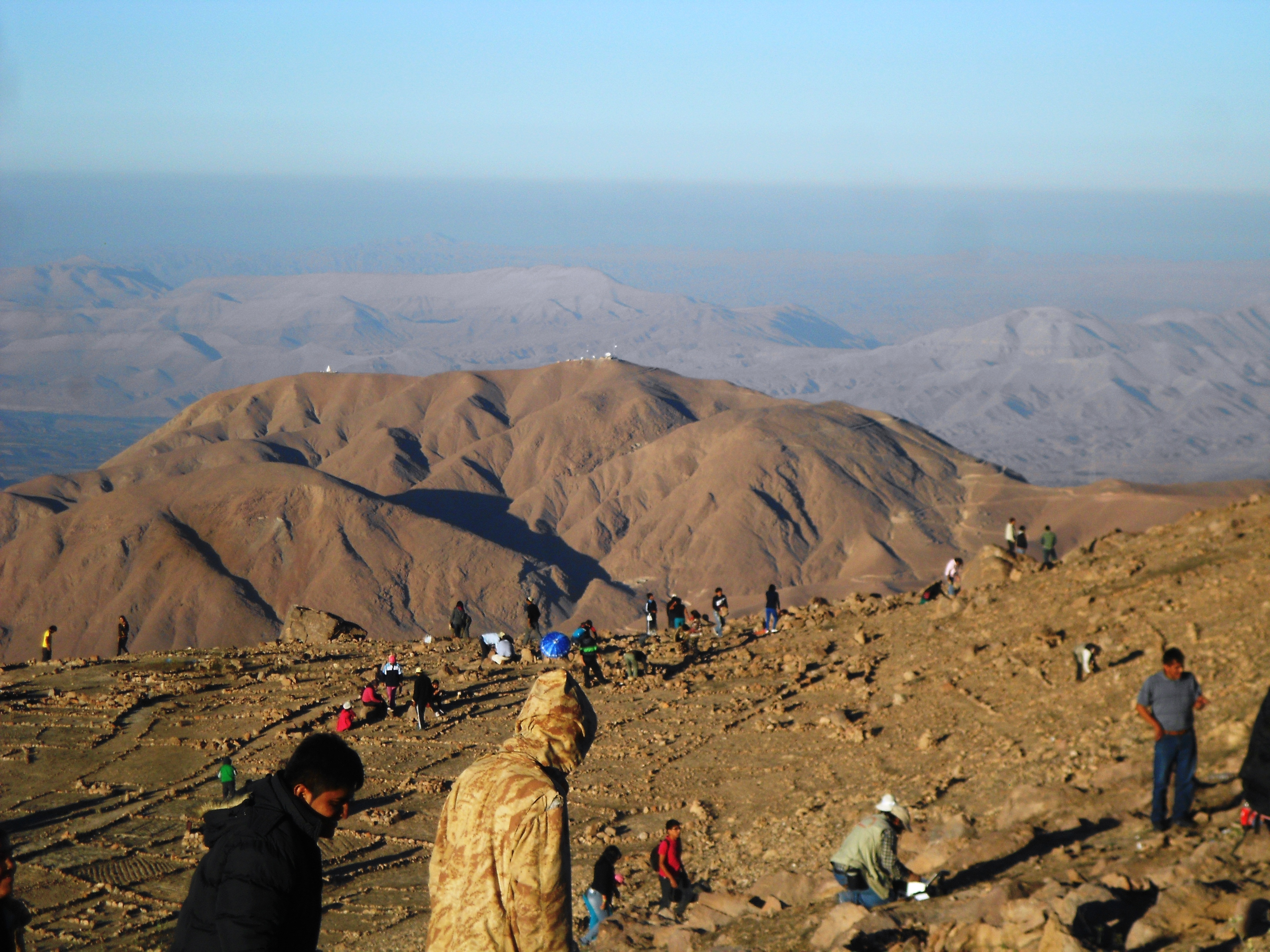
Cerro Baúl – an important Wari administrative and ceremonial center. Located in the highlands of Peru.

The Wari had an expansionist culture beginning sometime in the seventh century AD, given its military related weaponry. It is estimated that their expansionist nature led to a greater level of violence than many of the other pre-Hispanic cultures. It's speculated that the Wari relied on force to conquer and consolidate territories, utilizing of cost-effective strategies. Those may have ranged from implied force, coercive diplomacy to co-opting local political hierarchies.

Militarism played a significant role in the Wari Empire, evident in various aspects of its structure and iconography. Subsidiary centers surrounding the capital were fortified, indicating a strategic emphasis on defense. A 2-square-kilometer walled complex at Pikillaqta potentially housed a military garrison, fortified with smaller sites and walls designed to resist military threats and control access. Wari iconography frequently depicts soldiers equipped with military weaponry suggesting readiness for violent conflict.

By building imperial-style infrastructure, the empire-controlled areas along the Pacific coast and Andean highlands. Provincial centers include Viracochapampa, Honcopampa, and Cerro Baúl, all of which share similar architectural styles and ceramic vessels. These sites were connected to the capital, Huari, by a network of imperial roads creating a unified polity.

At the World Congress on Mummy Studies, research shed light on the collapse of the Wari Empire, where Wari society transitioned from cooperation to violence. Tiffiny Tung, a bioarchaeologist of Vanderbilt University, showcased a study highlighting the connections seen between environmental stressors, political instability, and societal collapse in the empire's collapse. Following 1000 was a period marked by violence and hardship following the empire's demise. The collapse, possibly exacerbated by severe drought, unleashed centuries of violence and social breakdown, leaving a vivid record in human bones.

Through analysis of skeletal remains from Huari, violence seemed to be present even during the empire's peak, intensifying afterward, seen by a dramatic increase in fatal injuries. The collapse also affected dietary patterns, with women experiencing significant changes, possibly indicating food scarcity or dietary shifts. Moreover, post-collapse burials showed signs of desecration, suggesting a shift in traditional burial practices and social norms. Ongoing research seeks to uncover molecular indicators of stress in ancient DNA, providing further insights into the health and well-being of Wari society during this period.

== Decline ==
The empire's decline begin around the 10th century.

== Archaeological sites ==
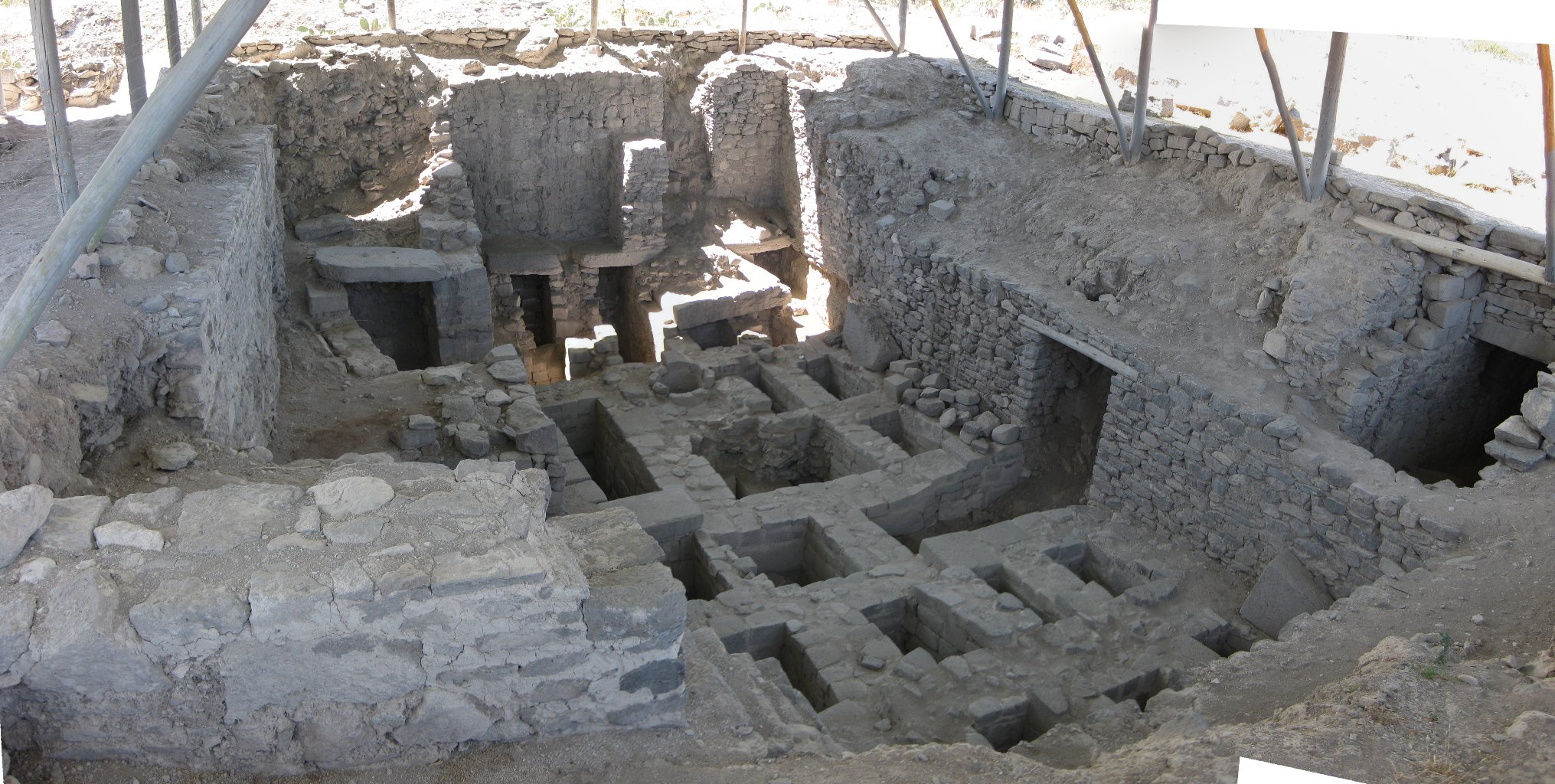
Huari - Tomb containing remains in the capital city of the Wari empire

=== Northern Wari ruins (Cerro Pátapo) ===
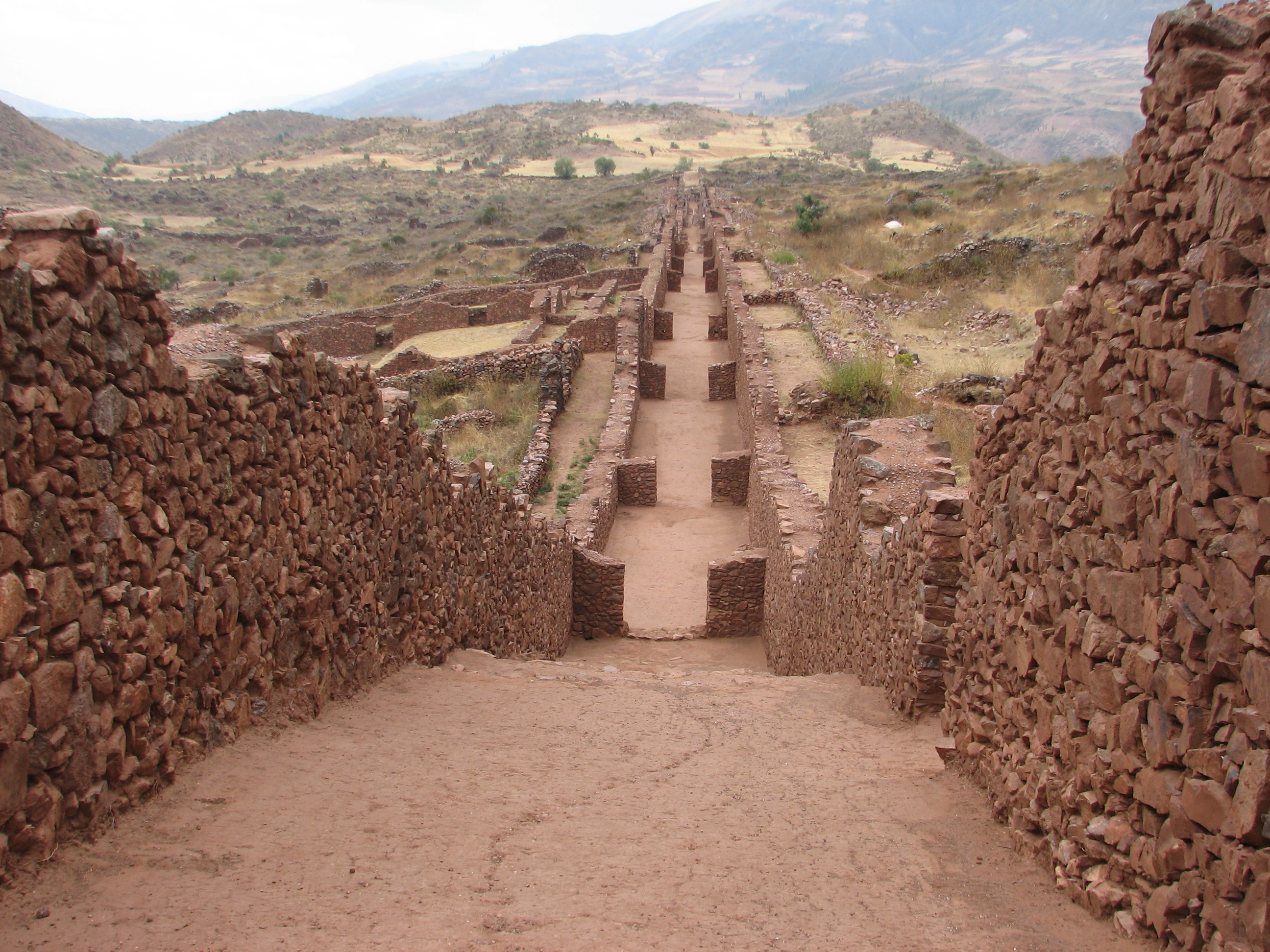
Pikillacta – Large Wari architectural site 20 miles east of Cusco

In 2008, a team led by archaeologist Cesar Soriano discovered the ruins of a city near Chiclayo. The Northern Wari Ruins provide the first evidence of the Wari in Northern Peru. There are signs of human sacrifice in the site as archaeologists have found bones at the bottom of a cliff. Along with the piles of bones, the remains of a young woman were found. Evidence found by archaeologists at the site suggests a potential link between the Wari and Moche Civilization. The site has been preserved well due to the hot dry climate of Peru.

=== Pikillacta (Pikillaqta) ===
Pikillacta was a 495 acre settlement near the Cusco basin. The central part of Pikillacta was a series of multi-room buildings that Joyce Marcus compared to ice trays. The first archaeological excavation of Pikillacta was conducted in 1927 but minimal evidence was found. Through three separate excavations, Gordon McEwan made extensive discoveries at Pikillacta. Although Pikillacta is one of the largest Wari Archaeological sites that has been found, there is not a substantial amount of evidence suggesting that people actually lived there. Evidence found at the suite, such as the lack of doorways, has led archaeologists to theorize that Pikillacta could have been used as an insane asylum or prison.

=== Cerro Baúl ===
Located in south of what is now Peru, Cerro Baul was one of the most important discoveries for determining the relationship between the Tiwanaku and the Wari Empire, interpreting the duration of the empire, and the relationship between the capital Huari and other regions. It was an administrative and ceremonial center in Moquegua Valley. there were two distinct types of architecture found, public buildings associated with administrative tasks built similarly to ones in the capital Huari, and secondly small housing for the people who lived atop the mesa. There was evidence of a variety of different food sources and animals present, which shows the expansive trade network within the Empire. It is also theorized that the different food sources present were restricted based on different levels of social standing, and many of the animals present may not have been used for food but rather as sacrifices for religious rituals.

== See also ==
- Wari culture
- Tiwanaku Empire
