= Wilcahuaín =

Archaeological site in Peru

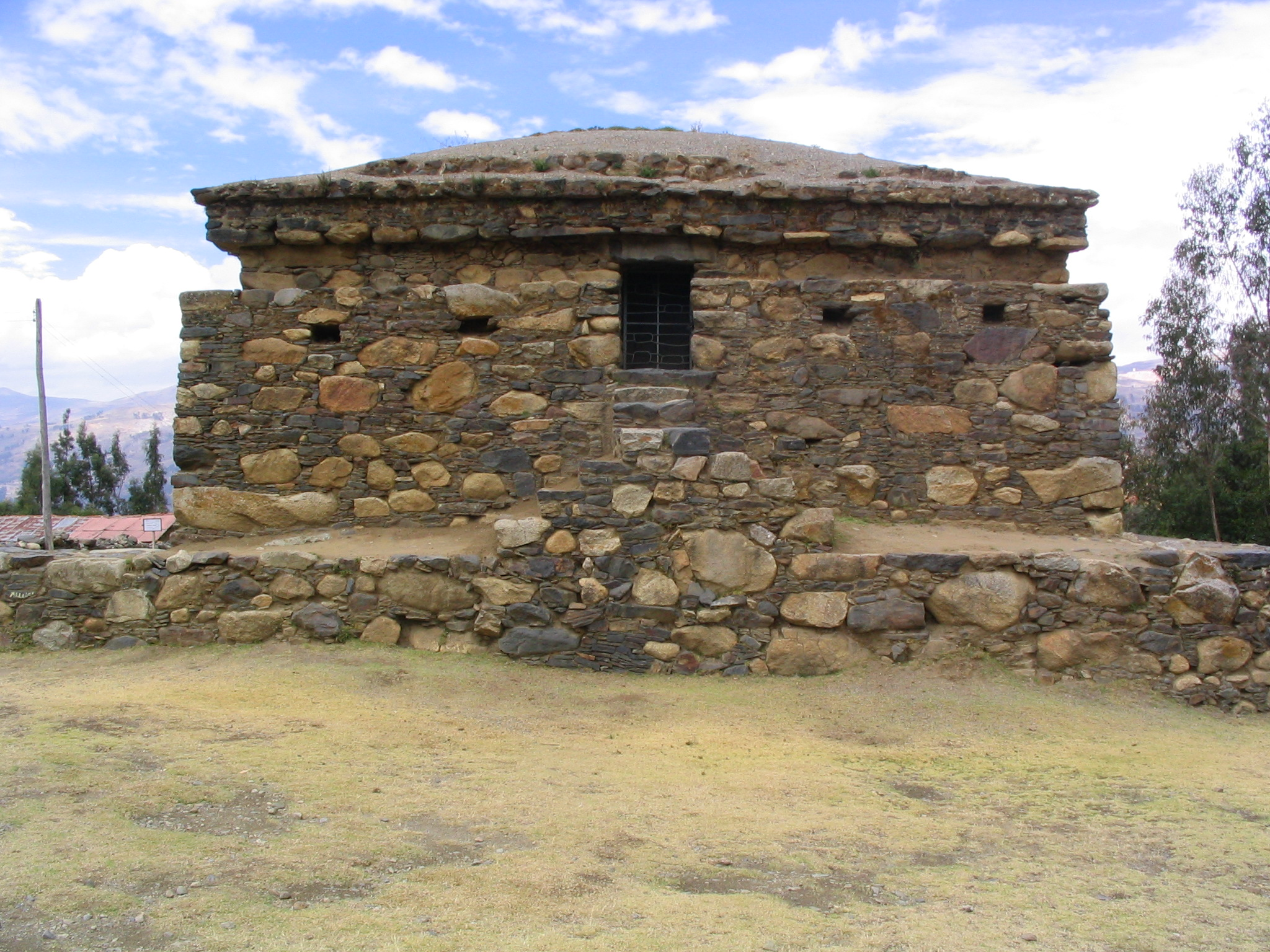

- Location within Peru
- 9.4833°S 77.5112°W
- Cultures: Wari
- Location: Peru, Ancash Region
- Region: Andes

History
- Built: 1100

Wilcahuaín, Willcahuaín, or Huilcahuaín is an archaeological site in Peru. It is located near the village of Paria, 6 km northeast of the city of Huaraz, Ancash; at an elevation of 3,400 m (11,200 ft).

Wilcahuaín is regarded as one of the most important archaeological sites of the Wari culture. It was possibly built ca. 1100 AD.

The site can be reached by 15-passenger van from the city. Fare is 2.50 Soles. The last half of the route is on very rough road.

== Etymology ==
Wilcahuaín possibly comes from Quechua willka grandchild; great-grandson; minor god; holy; sacred or Anadenanthera colubrina (a tree), and Ancash Quechua wayi house.
