= Cerro Baúl =

Mountain in Peru

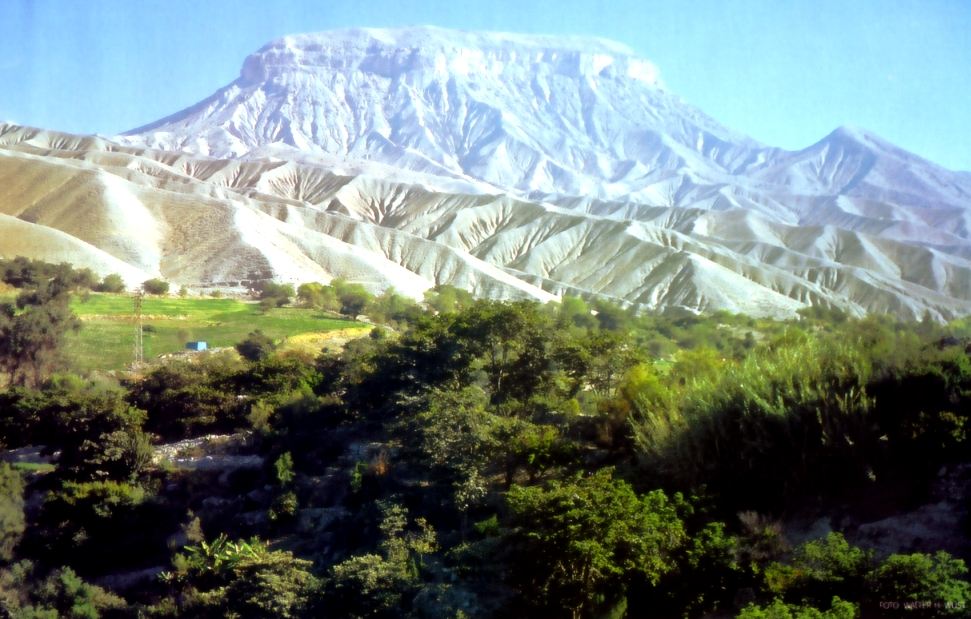
- Cerro Baúl

- Location within Peru
- 17°6′43.614″S 70°51′31.716″W
- Cultures: Wari culture
- Location: Moquegua, Peru
- Region: Moquegua

History
- Abandoned: approximately A. D. 1475
- Event(s): Conquered by: The Inca army

Site notes
- Architectural style: Wari
- Excavation dates: 1989, 1993, 1997, 1998, 2001, 2002, 2004, and 2006-7, 2010, 2012
- Archaeologists: Robert Pritzker, Donna Nash, Patrick Ryan Williams, Johny Isla, Michael E. Moseley, Nicola Sharratt, Robert Feldman

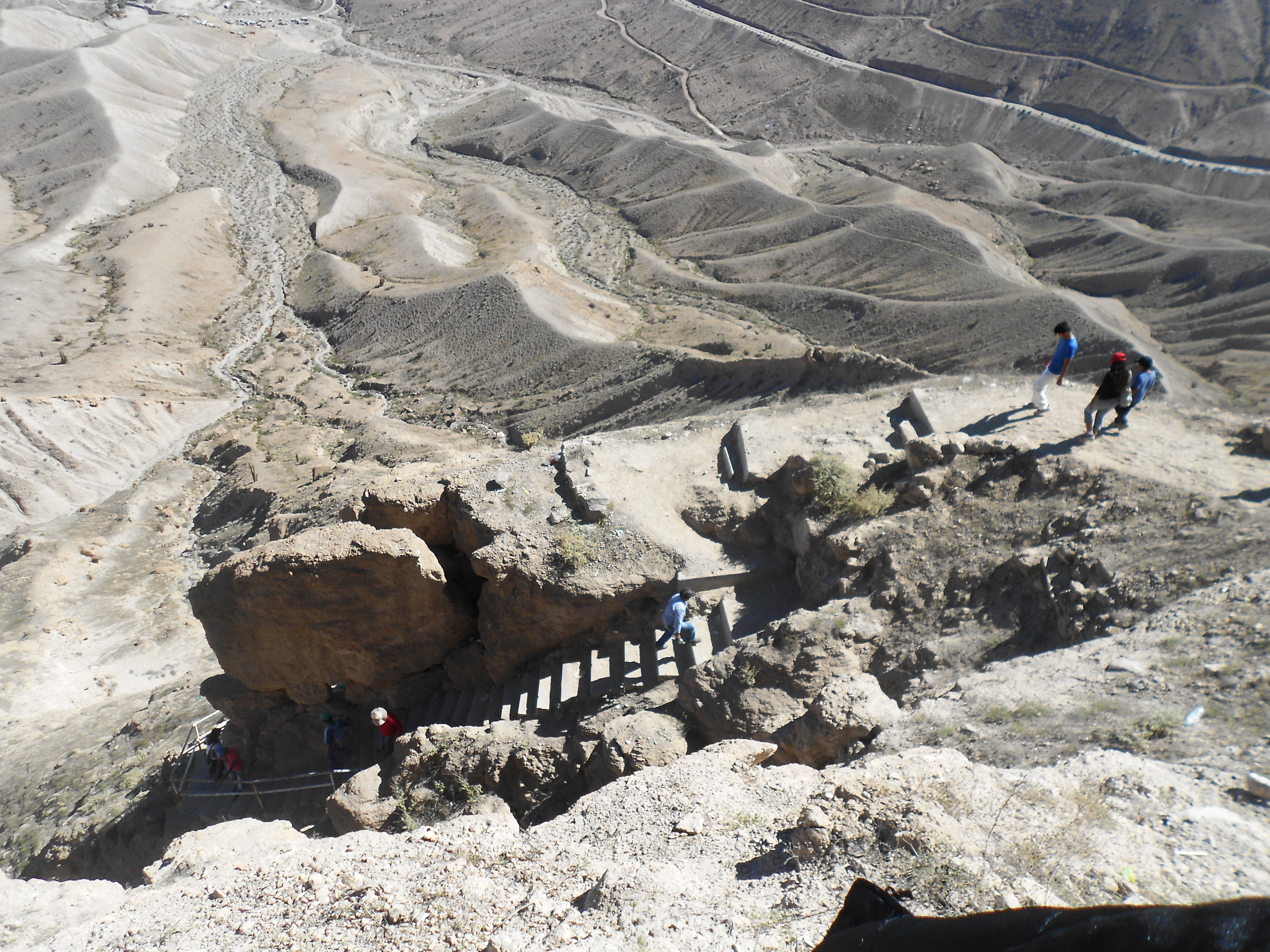
Cerro Baul, steps to site. 2013 photo.

Cerro Baúl (Spanish: Cerro "hill", Spanish: Baúl "trunk" (i.e. a place to store treasured items)) is an ancient political outpost and ceremonial center settlement in Peru established by the pre-Incan empire called the Wari. Cerro Baúl is a terraced mountain, 2000 feet above its surroundings, with a settlement on the cliff tops themselves and in the immediate surroundings. Among other finds are the remnants of a brewery and large buildings that may have been used for ceremonial feasting. There is evidence of damage that has been interpreted as a careful and deliberate destruction, by the city's own people, of several buildings prior to the mesa's being vacated.

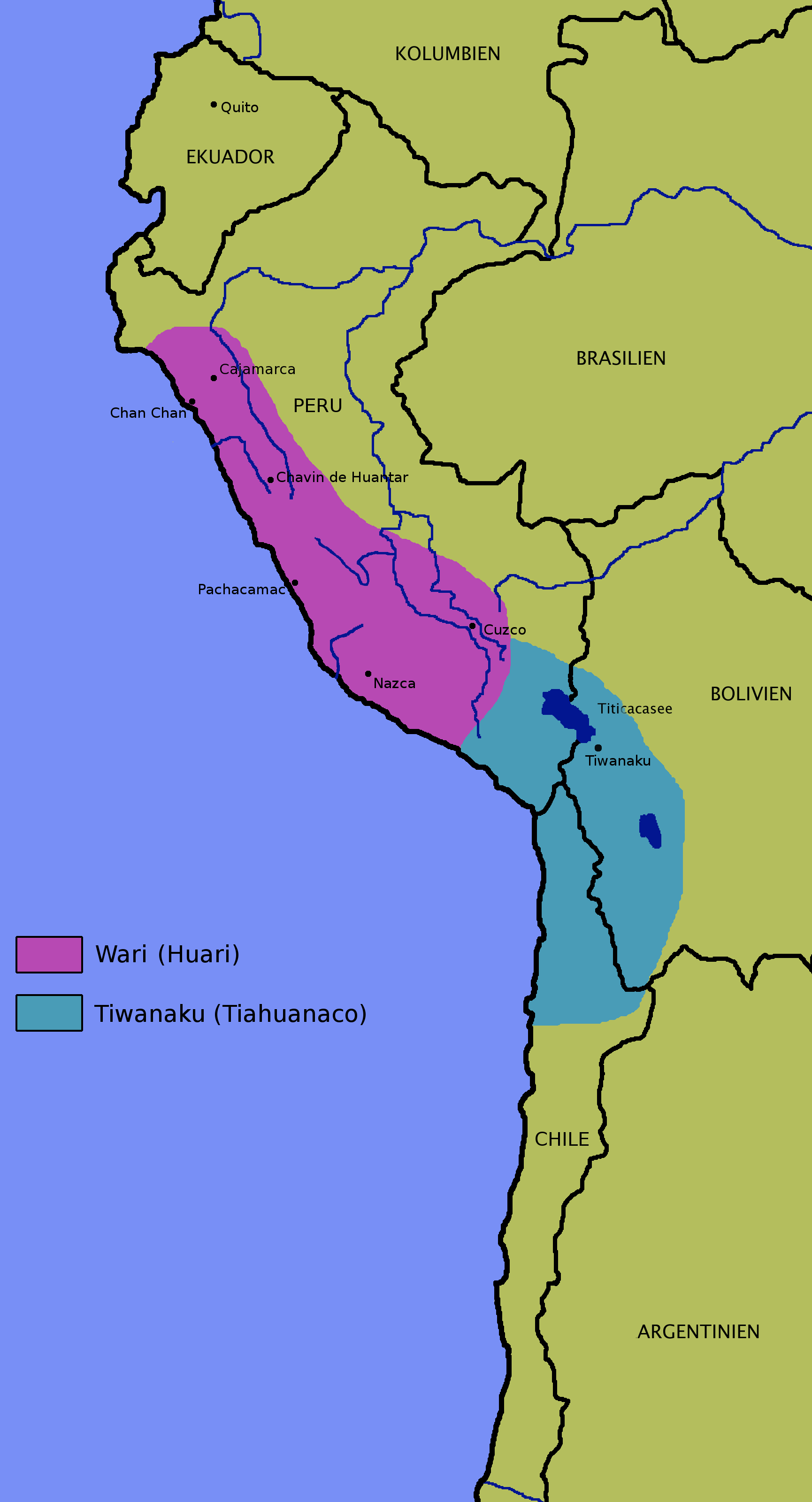

== Description of site ==
The summit of Cerro Baúl is located in the Moquegua Valley. Both Cerro Baúl and the adjacent Cerro Mejia were under Wari control. The Wari had introduced the agricultural technology of terracing the mountainside and digging long canals across the land. A 6.2-mile canal was built from the Torata River through the El Paso Divide between Cerro Baúl and Cerro Mejia, where it split to irrigate the terraces that flanked both hills. Also along the terraced slopes we find the homes of the majority of the center's citizens. At the top of the mountain we find the public and elite living spaces. There are two D-shaped temples, in the Wari style, on the eastern and middle sections of the site. Also along the eastern side are one-story domiciles similar to the ones along the terraces. These are considered to be the artisan residence area by archaeologists. The central sector seems to be the ceremonial core, while the western sector comprises the two-story dwellings of the elite. Sprinkled throughout this city we find the most common architectural form used by the Wari civilization, which is an enclosed plaza flanked by impressive stone halls. The halls included residences of governors and wealthy citizens, government offices, and beer houses for state-held parties.

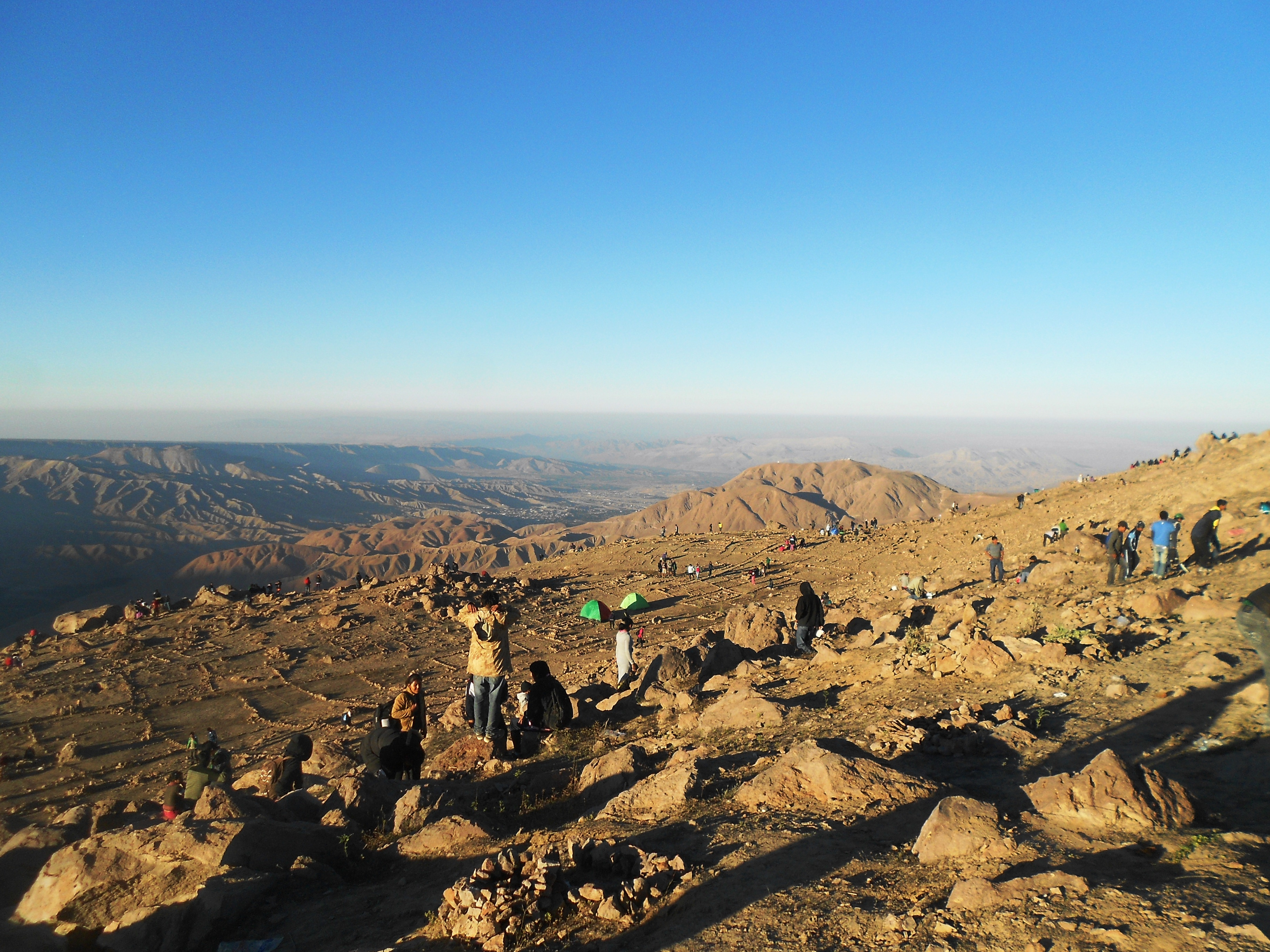
Ancient terracing at Cerro Baul. 2013 photo

== Asociación Contisuyo ==
Asociación Contisuyo (in Quechua: Kunti Suyu), literally translated to Association "Bias West or West Region", is an assemblage of Peruvian and American scholars with interests in the mapping and excavation of Cerro Baúl. Founded in 1981 directors Robert Pritzker and Dr. Michael Moseley, then of the Field Museum of Natural History combined their resources with the Southern Peru Copper Corporation to further their research at Cerro Baúl. Prior to the first excavations it was believed that the Wari civilization had obtained the area subsequent to Tiwanaku control; however, it is now known from archaeological artifacts found in the area, such as kero (a ceremonial cup), in the hybrid styles of both Wari and Tiwanaku, that they had occupied the areas at the same time. It is believed that the two cultures employed the close space rather peacefully, as there is no evidence of warfare and evidence of shared culture and styles from about A.D. 600 to 1020. The scholars, armed with the annals of a Spanish chronicler and two seasons of excavations, were able to find evidence that supported the Inca siege and capture of the Wari political outpost.

== Wari political outpost and ceremonial center ==
The Wari (Spanish: Huari) culture of Peru in the Middle Horizon period (400 AD-1000 AD) was one of several Andean cultures before the rise of the Inca that can be termed "empires." They were not just city states but actually exerted their influence over neighboring groups (or subjugated them). The Wari area of influence lay in what is now the central highlands of Peru and their area of influence overlapped that of another culture, the Tiwanaku. The Wari made their bold thrust into the Tiwanaku area of control by seizing both Cerro Baúl and the adjacent Cerro Mejia. By terracing and irrigating the areas for the sustainment of the city's populace, they managed to make the Tiwanaku at least partially dependent on their society as the water streaming from the mountain rainstorms had to pass by a Wari canal before it reached Tiwanaku fields. The relationship, however, seemed to be some positive interaction between the two peoples as seen in the Tiwanaku-style drinking vessel used in ceremonies that was among the Wari's most sacred ceremonial offerings found at the site.

With the demise of the Wari and Tiwanaku civilizations, the people of the Chiribaya culture lived in the area until they were conquered or colonized by the Inca.

== Inca siege and conquest ==
What we know of the Inca siege comes from Spanish chronicler Garcilaso de la Vega and is supported by excavations by the Programa Contisuyo. The Wari people were blockaded within their city by the surrounding Inca army for 54 days. During this time their people were without water and little food; finally in despair they sent their children down to the Inca in hopes for mercy. The Inca were reported to have received the children with kindness, fed them, and sent them back up the mountains with some supplies for their people. The final evacuation of the center enclave was accompanied by elaborate ceremonies with brewing, drinking, feasting vessel smashing and building burning. The Wari surrendered unconditionally to the Inca around A.D. 1475.

== Today ==
In current times, Cerro Baúl is a place of worship for the local Moqueguanos (inhabitants of Moquegua [/moˈkeɣwa/], a city founded by the Spanish colonists in southern Peru, located in the Moquegua Region, of which it is the capital) to offer pagapus (payment) to the Andean deities in the form of coca, candles and chicha, to list a few. Tourism is also available to this site.
