= Wari (archaeological site) =

Archaeological site in Peru

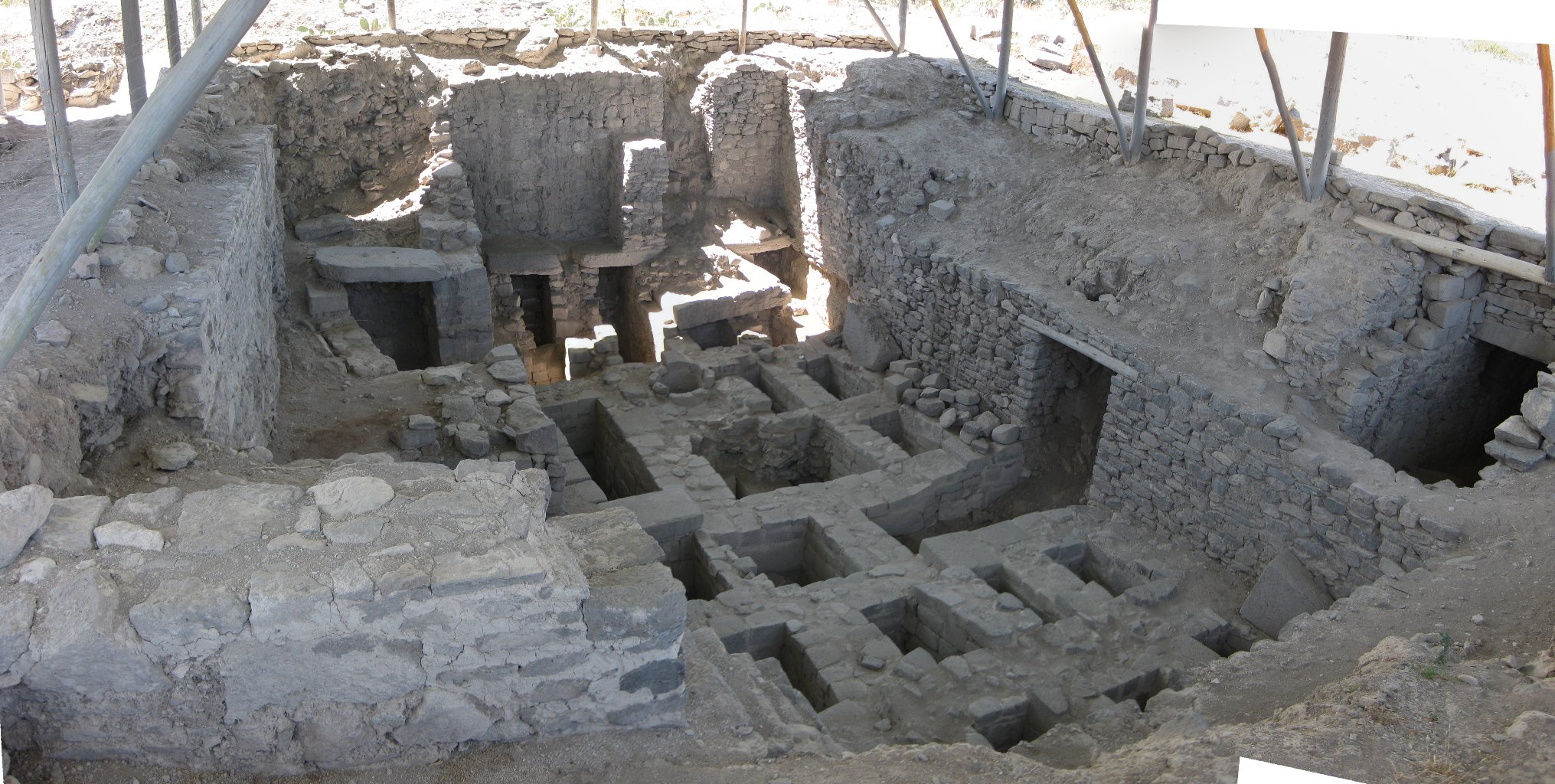
- A tomb at Wari

- Location within Peru
- 13°03′38″S 74°11′56″W
- Type: Settlement
- Periods: Middle Horizon
- Cultures: Wari culture
- Location: Huamanga Province, Ayacucho

History
- Built: 400 AD
- Abandoned: 1000 AD

Wari or Huari is an archaeological site located near the town of Quinua, 22 km (14 mi) northeast of the city of Ayacucho, in the Ayacucho Region, Peru at an elevation of 2,600–2,900 m (8,500–9,500 ft). It was the capital city of the Wari Empire and one of the largest urban settlements in ancient Peru.

== History ==
Wari was founded ca. 400 AD and gained prominence around 550 AD. At its height, the city was inhabited by around 70,000 people from different cultures, making it the center of a new religion that synthesized the beliefs of those various peoples. The city was abandoned ca. 1000 AD. The Wari culture is generally recognized to have lasted from 600-1000 C.E in the highlands of the Andes. It is noted to be one of the largest pre-Inca civilizations, with some sources suggesting an expansion to the coast of Peru. The Wari culture flourished during the ‘Middle Horizon’ period in which the Wari were considered an ‘expansive civilization’ by some scholars.

== Infrastructure ==
The archaeological site spans an area of 2000 hectares, and comprises several areas or neighborhoods. Buildings are made of stone and mudbrick, and painted in red and white. Many of the structures had residential, administrative or religious purposes. Residential buildings were often used as multi-generation family housing.While D-shaped temples were used for sacred ceremonies and practices. Rituals that occurred here included an abandonment, or sacrifice, of items such as textiles and ceramics. To move goods, people, and ideas, the Wari built roads connecting communities. Having these dedicated pathways allowed them to have a greater influence ideologically, politically, and culturally on neighboring communities. These roads were complex and connected several communities together; likely operating as a place for gatherings or celebrations.

== Arts and ecology ==
Within the Wari Empire, several communities produced different agricultural commodities based on their ecological zone. The creation of ceramics made it easier for these communities to trade their products; this exchange system was called Yanquiku and was mainly done by Wari women. Urpu, a type of ceramic pottery, was used to store agricultural products such as maize, beans, wheat, and more. Urpu was favored for its ability to keep small rodents out of the produce, thanks to its long, narrow neck. Other styles involved a large opening and body (maqma) or a large opening and a smaller body (tinajas).

Besides storage, ceramics were used to create beer, typically consumed during festivities. The fermented drink, known as Chicha, had both cultural and political importance. The drink was made by Wari women using three types of ceramics: maqma, urpus, and puynos. Archaeologists have also identified the use of grinding stones in the production of Chicha, which was likely being mass-produced due to its cultural weight.

The ceramics found in the Wari empire had a variety of finishes. Some were smooth and decorated, while others were rough. Some of the pottery was even adorned with faces along the necks of the jars and geometric paintings along the bodies of the jars. These paintings depicted, but were not limited to, the social hierarchy and cultural complex that existed within the Wari empire.

== Colonization and expansion ==
Considered one of the largest pre-Incan empires, the Wari empire had an incredible influence on the communities both under and around its control. Infrastructure, such as roads, connected these communities, which did not speak the same language nor harbor the same culture, to maximize their labor. About 300km away from the Wari site lies Nasca, a city believed to have been under heavy Wari influence. The Wari influenced the pottery and architecture in Nasca, with two D-shaped temples, indicative of Wari architecture, and found at the Wari site was also found in Nasca.

== Household/social structure ==
Familial households were not limited to traditional nuclear family style layouts and were generally more likely to have had multiple members; at times, multiple families could be found residing in the same household together. Attached houses that were utilized by servants, known as yanacuna, were also common in Wari households. In household units, Andean women were largely in control of the food stores. Author Donna Nash says, “Household members - include those individuals that conduct productive tasks, eat or sleep regularly within a domestic setting”, leading to the size of households varying quite drastically.

== Mortuary and burial practices ==
Archaeology of both burial and mortuary spaces are difficult due to seasonal soil humidity and other factors in the Ayacucho region along with the general threat of looting however what burials have been recovered and documented are differently categorized. A simple Wari burial would generally be a flexed adult body with very few possessions along side the burial in simple pits. A more intermediate Wari burial would see a significant amount more labor. This is generally thought to have also been accompanied with more ceremony too. These burials would contain minor offerings and instead of regular pits were now stone lined pits with a latch or a lid. And a more advanced burial would then contain quite a few grave goods with evidence of bones being removed that perhaps would relate to mortuary ceremonies.

And finally in what is referred to as the monumental tomb, this referred to a particular tomb that has been generally recognized to have been the resting place of an individual or multiple individuals of high royalty. It contained multiple subterranean galleries and passageways. However this site had already been victim of looting prior to archaeologic survey.

- Cultural periods of Peru
- Chuqi Pukyu
- Northern Wari ruins
- Wari Empire
- Wari culture
