= Marpa, Peru =

Archaeological site in Peru

Coordinates: 15°14′58″S 72°59′20″W

Marpa
- Location within Peru
- Type: Settlement
- Location: La Union Province, Arequipa

Marpa is a ruined pre-Hispanic town located along the Cotahuasi Canyon in the Andes range of southern Peru.

The Cotahuasi River arises in the Wansu mountain range, cutting a route south-west and ending some 300 km later as the Ocoña River mouthing into the Pacific Ocean. Declared a "Zona Reserva Turistica" in 1988 very little is known about the canyon and Marpa. Rafting expeditions first ran the canyon in 1994. In pre-Hispanic times the Inca road along the canyon was well-used, and sections have survived, as have the ruins of agricultural terraces, staircases and ancient tombs. The Inca road may have been built along the route of an older road built by the Wari culture, a dominant force in the highlands of central and southern Peru between 500AD and 900AD.
