= Cerro Pátapo ruins =

Archaeological site in Peru

Northern Wari ruins Cerro Pátapo
- Ruins
- Click on the map for a fullscreen view
- Approximate location in Peru
- Coordinates: 6°43′17″S 79°38′41″W
- Country: Peru
- Region: Lambayeque Region
- Province: Chiclayo Province

Government
  - Type: None

Population
  - Total: 0
- Time zone: UTC-5 (PET)

The Cerro Pátapo ruins or Northern Wari ruins are the remains of a pre-Columbian city near the site of present-day Chiclayo, Peru. The ruins are primarily of the Wari (Huari) culture, which flourished from 350 CE to 1000 CE in the area along the coast and reaching to the highlands. These northern Wari ruins are distinguished from the Wari ruins in the Ayacucho Region to the south.

The discovery was announced on 16 December 2008 by the lead archeologist, Cesar Soriano. The ruins both present the first evidence of Wari influence found in Northern Peru and by their quality and extent, shows that this was an important site. Located 14 miles (23 kilometres) from Chiclayo, the ruins stretch over an area of 3 miles (4.8 kilometres).

The pre-Columbian Wari civilization was predominantly based in south-central Peru between the 7th and 12th centuries (600 to 1100 CE). It was known for having constructed a network of roads, and had an extensive territory. Scholars note its complex, distinctive architecture, monuments and roadbuilding as evidence that it was an empire.

== Discovery ==
The city was part of the Wari Empire, which ruled parts of the Andes Mountains, mostly in south-central Peru, between the 7th and 12th centuries CE. The site is remarkably well preserved due to the dry desert climate. Among the artifacts are pottery shards. The site includes evidence of human sacrifice, with special spots set aside and a pile of bones at the bottom of a cliff. Well-preserved remains have been found of one young woman.

The ruins are expected to help scholars fill the gap in knowledge about pre-Columbian South America, which was dominated by the Wari culture and the earlier Moche culture. The Moche began at 100 AD and perished around 600 AD.

Earlier in August 2008, archeologists at the Huaca Pucllana ruins in Lima (located some 500 miles or 800 kilometres south of Chiclayo) discovered a mummy that is also thought to be Wari. This was a more typical location for such a find, within the territory known to be Wari.

== See also ==
- Wari ruins
