= Automatic radar plotting aid =

Marine radar capability

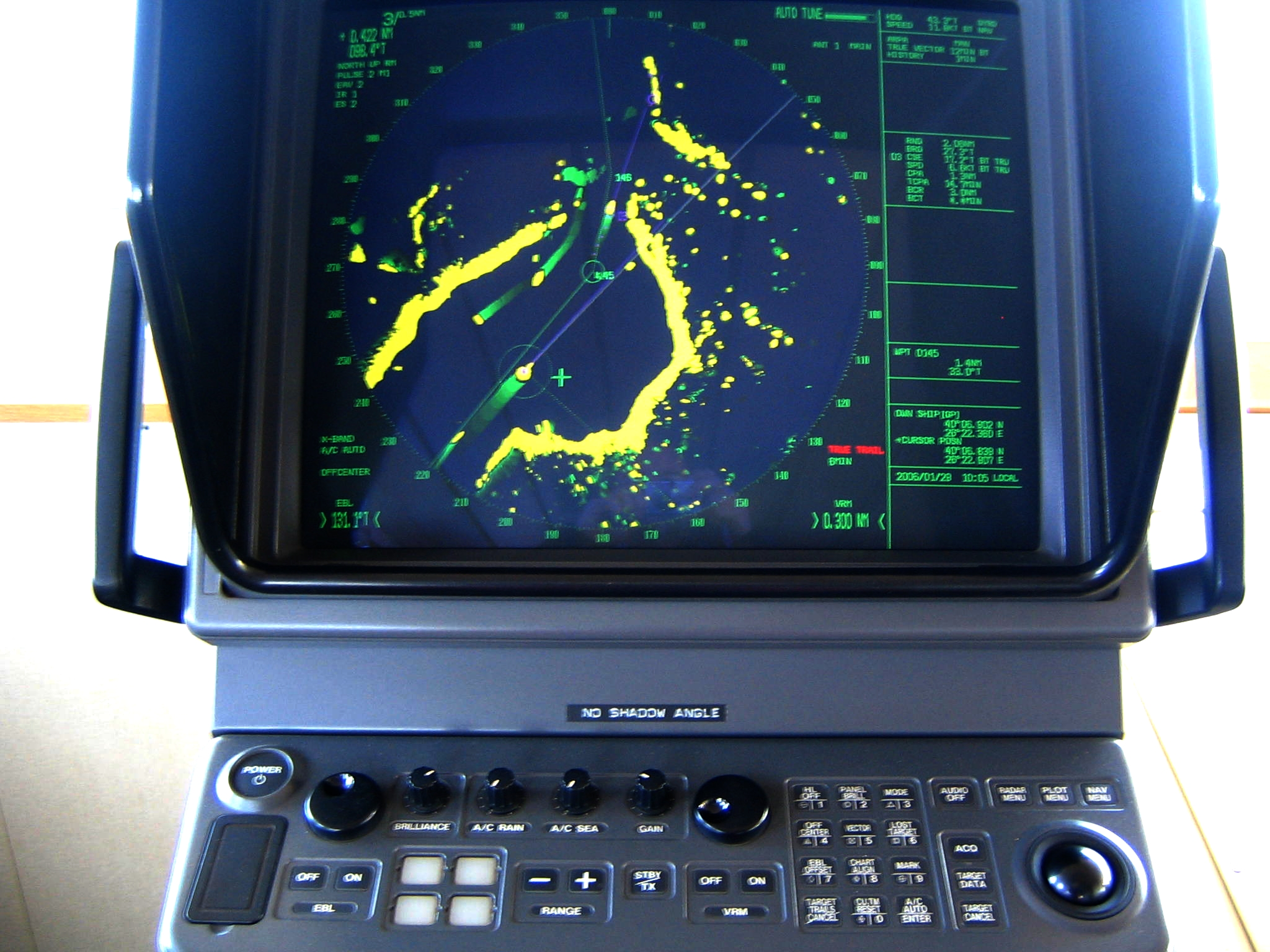
A typical shipboard ARPA/radar system.

A marine radar with automatic radar plotting aid (ARPA) capability can create tracks using radar contacts. The system can calculate the tracked object's course, speed and closest point of approach (CPA), thereby knowing if there is a danger of collision with the other ship or landmass.

Development of ARPA started after 1956, when the Italian liner SS Andrea Doria collided with the MS Stockholm in dense fog and sank off the east coast of the United States. ARPA radars started to emerge in the 1960s, with the development of microelectronics. The first commercially available ARPA was delivered to the cargo liner MV Taimyr in 1969 and was manufactured by Norcontrol, now a part of Kongsberg Gruppen. ARPA-enabled radars are now available even for small yachts.

== History ==
The availability of low cost microprocessors and the development of advanced computer technology during the 1970s and 1980s have made it possible to apply computer techniques to improve commercial marine radar systems. Radar manufacturers used this technology to create the Automatic Radar Plotting Aids. ARPAs are computer assisted radar data processing systems which generate predictive vectors and other ship movement information.

The International Maritime Organization (IMO) has set out certain standards amending the International Convention for the Safety of Life at Sea requirements regarding the carrying of suitable automated radar plotting aids. The primary function of ARPAs can be summarized in the statement found under the IMO Performance Standards. It states a requirement of ARPAs: "to improve the standard of collision avoidance at sea: Reduce the workload of observers by enabling them to automatically obtain information so that they can perform as well with multiple targets as they can by manually plotting a single target". As we can see from this statement the principal advantages of ARPA are a reduction in the workload of bridge personnel and fuller and quicker information on selected targets.

A typical ARPA function gives a presentation of the current situation and uses computer technology to predict future situations. An ARPA assesses the risk of collision, and enables operator to see proposed maneuvers by own ship.

While many different models of ARPAs are available on the market, the following functions are usually provided:

1. True or relative motion radar presentation.
2. Automatic acquisition of targets plus manual acquisition.
3. Digital read-out of acquired targets which provides course, speed, range, bearing, closest point of approach (CPA, and time to CPA (TCPA).
4. The ability to display collision assessment information directly on the Plan Position Indicator (PPI), using vectors (true or relative) or a graphical Predicted Area of Danger (PAD) display.
5. The ability to perform trial maneuvers, including course changes, speed changes, and combined course/speed changes.
6. Automatic ground stabilization for navigation purposes. ARPA processes radar information much more rapidly than conventional radar but is still subject to the same limitations. ARPA data is only as accurate as the data that comes from inputs such as the gyro and speed log.

== Standalone and integral ARPAs ==
The initial development and design of ARPAs were stand-alone units. That is because they were designed to be an addition to the conventional radar unit. All of the ARPA functions were installed on board as a separate unit, but needed to be interfaced with existing equipment to get the basic radar data. The primary benefits were cost and time savings for ships already equipped with radar. This of course was not the ideal situation and eventually it was the integral ARPA that replaced the stand-alone unit.

The majority of ARPAs manufactured in the 21st century integrate the ARPA features with the radar display. The modern integral ARPA combines the conventional radar data with the computer data processing systems into one unit. The main operational advantage is that both the radar and ARPA data are readily comparable.

== ARPA displays ==
From the time radar was first introduced to the present day the radar picture has been presented on the screen of a cathode-ray tube (CRT). Although the CRT has retained its function over the years, the way in which the picture is presented has changed considerably. From about the mid-1980s the first raster scan displays appeared. The radial-scan Plan position indicator (PPI) was replaced by a raster-scan PPI generated on a television type of display. The integral ARPA and conventional radar units with a raster-scan display will gradually replace the radial-scan radar sets.

The development of commercial marine radar entered a new phase in the 1980s when raster-scan displays that were compliant with the IMO Performance Standards were introduced.

The radar picture of a raster-scan synthetic display is produced on a television screen and is made up of a large number of horizontal lines which form a pattern known as a raster. This type of display is much more complex than the radial-scan synthetic display and requires a large amount of memory. There are a number of advantages for the operator of a raster-scan display and concurrently there are some deficiencies too. The most obvious advantage of a raster-scan display is the brightness of the picture. This allows the observer to view the screen in almost all conditions of ambient light. Out of all the benefits offered by a raster-scan radar it is this ability which has assured its success. Another difference between the radial-scan and raster-scan displays is that the latter has a rectangular screen. The screen size is specified by the length of the diagonal and the width and height of the screen with an approximate ratio of 4:3. The raster-scan television tubes have a much longer life than a traditional radar CRT. Although the tubes are cheaper over their counterpart, the complexity of the signal processing makes it more expensive overall.

=== Raster-scan PPI ===
The IMO Performance Standards for radar to provide a plan display with an effective display diameter of 180mm, 250mm, or 340mm depending upon the gross tonnage of the vessel. With the diameter parameters already chosen, the manufacturer has then to decide how to arrange the placement of the digital numerical data and control status indicators. The raster-scan display makes it easier for design engineers in the way auxiliary data can be written.raster from azimuth information digitized.

== The plot when own ship manoeuvers ==
At normal your ARPA does everything automatically, but here you find some more information about how to actually plot your ship. When it is decided (after assessment of the initial plot) that it is necessary for own ship to manoeuvre, it is essential to determine the effect of that manoeuvre prior to its execution and to ensure that it will result in a safe passing distance. After the manoeuvre has been completed, plotting must be continued to ensure that the manoeuvre is having the desired effect.

=== The plot when own ship alters course only ===
Because of the time taken for a change in speed to have any effect on the apparent motion line, the mariner will frequently select a change in course if it will achieve a satisfactory passing distance.

This has some distinct advantages:

1. It is quick to take effect.
2. The vessel retains steerage way.
3. The encounter may be more quickly cleared.
4. It is more likely to be detected if the other vessel is plotting.

Example. With own ship steering 000° at a speed of 12 knots, an echo is observed as follows:

1. 0923 echo bears 037° (T) at 9.5 n mile
2. 0929 echo bears 036° (T) at 8.0 n mile
3. 0935 echo bears 034° (T) at 6.5 n mile

At 0935 it is intended to alter course 60° to starboard (We assume this to be instantaneous).

1. predict the new CPA and TCPA
2. Predict the new CPA and TCPA if the manoeuvre is delayed until 0941.
3. Predict the range and bearing of the echo at 0935, if the (instantaneous) manoeuvre is made at 0941.

== See also ==
- Automatic Identification System (AIS) – another navigation tool that generates tracks and closest approach information.
- Mini Automatic Radar Plotting Aid (MARPA) or Automatic Tracking Aid (ATA)
- Radar tracker

== Bibliography ==
- United States National Geospatial Intelligence Agency Publication 1310, The Radar Navigation and Maneuvering Board Manual, Chapter 5. Available online.
- Radar in the 21st Century
- Electronic maps for ARPA Radar in all Russia ports
