= El Castillo de Huarmey =

Archaeological site in Peru

Coordinates: 10.0500°S 78.1333°W

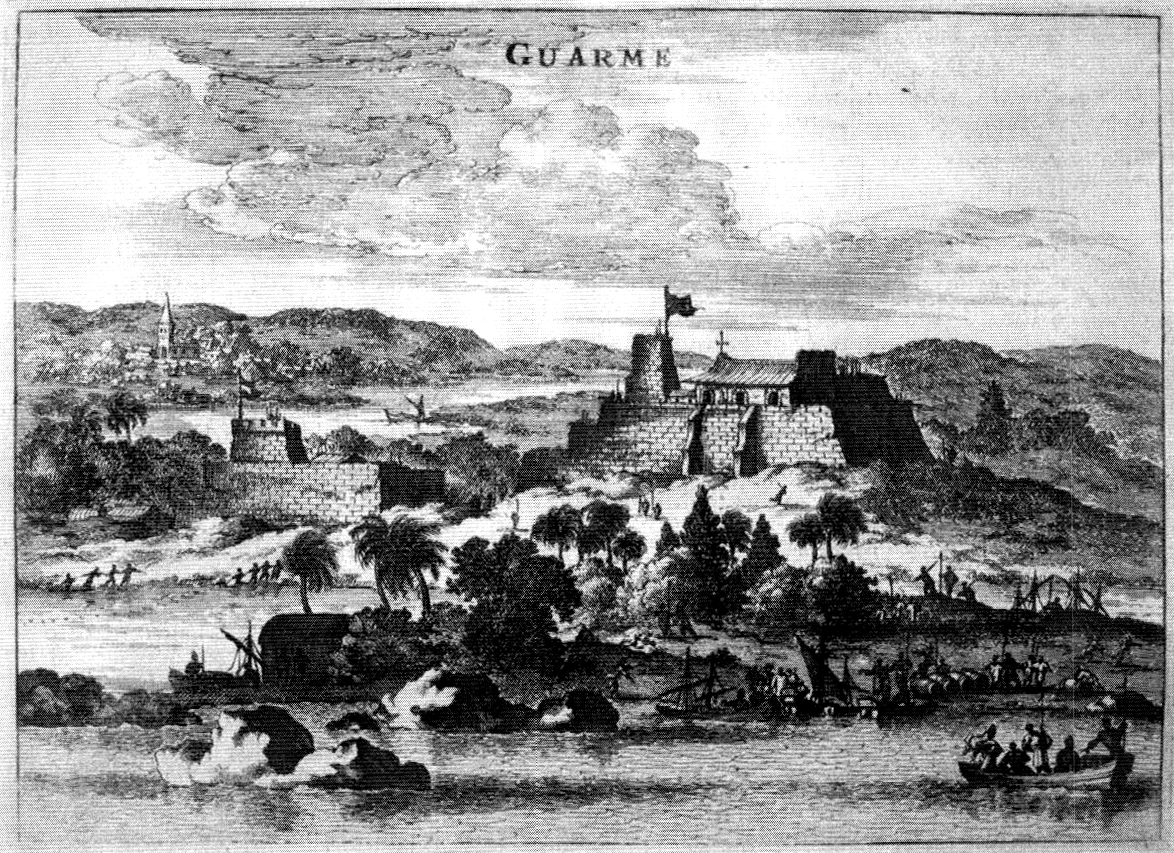
Castillo de Huarmey

El Castillo de Huarmey (English: "the Castle on the River Huarmey") is a pyramid-like structure on the coast of Peru, in the Ancash Region north of Lima, the most studied section of the archeological complex is the Wari mausoleum which was discovered in an undisturbed condition. The 2013 discovery at El Castillo de Huarmey of a royal Wari tomb containing 60 individuals and three burials of elite women suggests the need to reassess the Wari presence on the coast of Peru. The 45-hectare (110-acre) area around the tomb has been the target of looters for decades. The team named the site, which provided evidence of the Wari Empire. El Castillo de Huarmey was excavated in secret over the course of several months in 2013 to prevent looting.

In January 2010, Giersz's team located what appeared to be a subterranean tomb using aerial photographs and geophysical imaging tools on a ridge between two other pyramids. The ridge had long been a dumping site for rubble for tomb robbers. In September 2012 the team found a stone throne room. Below this was a chamber sealed by tons of loose stone fill.

The burial chamber of the royal tomb was discovered in early 2013 by a Peruvian-Polish research team, which was led by Milosz Giersz of Poland's University of Warsaw and co-director Roberto Pimentel Nita and funded by the National Geographic Society.

The tomb contained 1,200 artifacts, including gold earrings, bronze axes, jewelry made of copper and silver, and silver bowls. The tomb contained 60 human bodies buried in rows in a seated position and clothed in deteriorating textiles. Three side chambers contained three bodies of royal Wari women whose bodies were accompanied by prized possessions, including gold weaving tools. Giersz said "We are talking about the first unearthed royal imperial tomb of the Wari." The richness of this mausoleum is a strong indication of the extent to which the Wari controlled this part of northern Peru. Giersz found evidence that the royal bodies had been repeatedly removed from the burial chambers, presumably for royal displays during the Wari era, an indication of royal ancestor worship.

In May 2026, archaeologists studying animal remains identified the first physical evidence of Peruvian hairless dogs at a site associated with the Wari Empire. Researchers recovered skeletal remains, including a naturally mummified dog skull with preserved skin and traces of red cinnabar pigment, and identified at least three individuals displaying characteristics associated with the breed. Several dogs were found in association with elite burials and ceremonial contexts, including one puppy buried with an elite artisan known as the “Master Basketmaker.” Isotopic analysis indicated that some of the dogs received distinct diets and care compared to other animals at the site. Archaeologists suggested that the dogs may have functioned as companions, ritual offerings, or spiritual guides in funerary practices, reflecting their role in Wari social and ceremonial life.

== See also ==
- 2013 in archaeology
- Huarmey
- Wari culture
