= Honcopampa =

Archaeological site in Peru

Hunqupampa
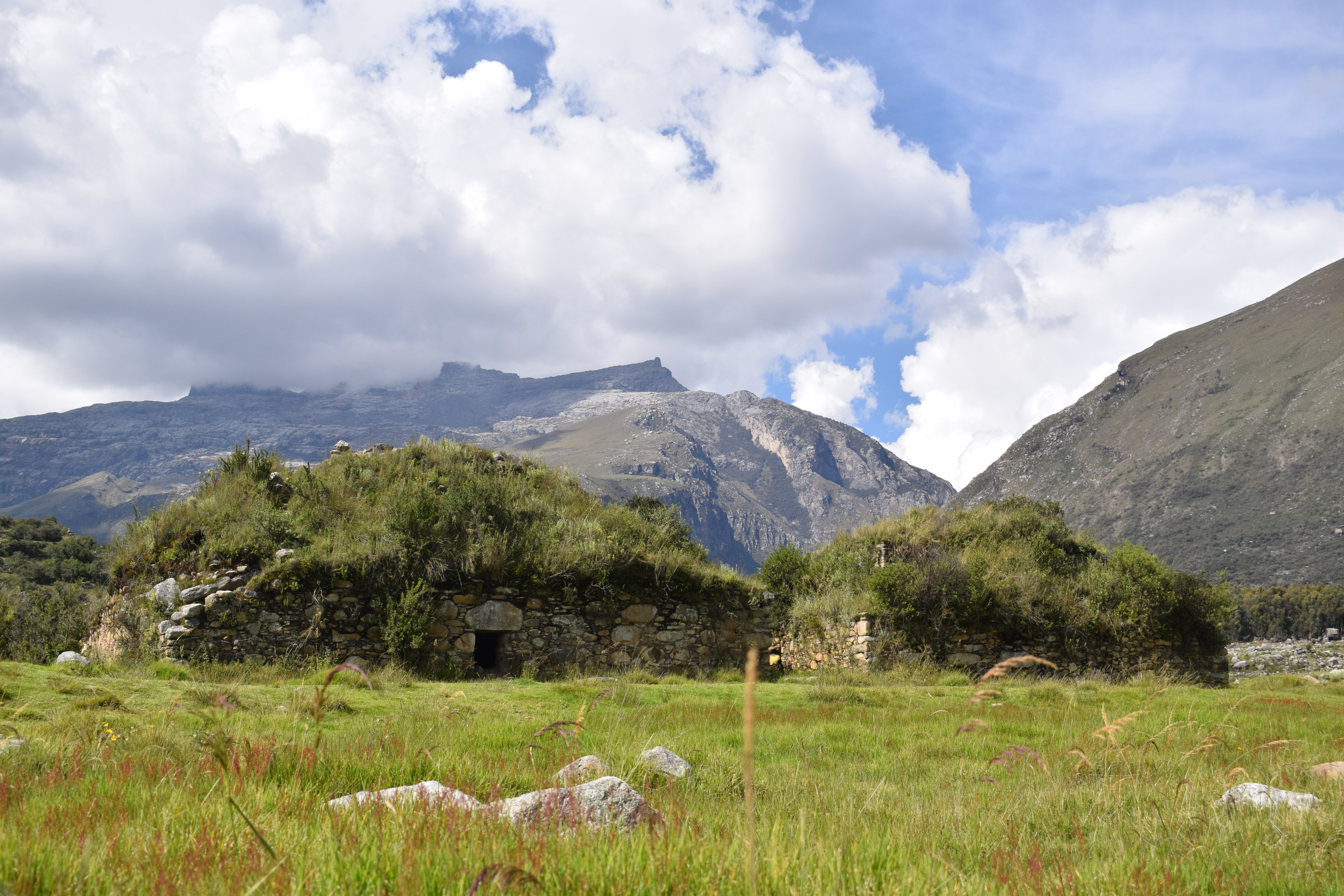
- Interactive map of Hunqupampa
- 9°21′35.4″S 77°31′13.9″W
- Location: Peru, Ancash Region, Carhuaz Province

Site notes
- Height: 3,500 metres (11,483 ft)

Honcopampa or Joncopampa (possibly from Ancash Quechua hunqu swamp, pampa plain) is an archaeological site in Peru. It is situated in the Ancash Region, Carhuaz Province, Aco District, at a height of about 3,500 metres (11,483 ft). Hunqupampa is considered one of the most important archaeological sites of the Callejón de Huaylas. It lies in the little populated place named Hunqupampa (Joncopampa).
