= Mini-automatic radar plotting aid =

Marine radar feature

Mini-automatic radar plotting aid (or MARPA) is a maritime radar feature for target tracking and collision avoidance. Targets must be manually selected, but are then tracked automatically, including range, bearing, target speed, target direction (course), CPA (closest point of approach), and TCPA (time of closest point of approach), safe or dangerous indication, and proximity alarm. MARPA is a more basic form of ARPA (automatic radar plotting aid).

User selected Targets are initially highlighted with a small box whilst MARPA resolves the relative motion by comparing the relative motion of the target on the screen with the true, actual motion (speed) of the tracking vessel. Once resolved the acquiring box will become either a Circle for safe targets or a triangle for dangerous targets. MARPA can indicate further information with 2 very different but similar looking vectors: True Vectors and Relative Vectors.

True heading and speed of a target can be ascertained with a True Vector, the length of the line indicates the distance the target will actually cover per duration of vector, usually 6 or 3 minutes (this is user selectable). Range permitting, the 6 minute vectors provide quicker mental calculation of speed. E.g. True 6min vector (TV6) of 0.75 NM indicates the target's true speed is 7.5 Knots, the direction of this vector indicates the vessels heading relative to the tracking vessel or its electronically fed heading if one exists.

The relative motion of a target can be seen with Relative vectors, these just show the future position of the target on the Radar screen per Vector Duration, again usually 6 or 3 minutes depending on range in use. A relative vector of 6 minutes (RV6) would be a line representing the movement of the target for the next 6 minutes.

Most colour Radar displays can show both TV and RV simultaneously. It is essential that users of MARPA not confused them, especially on Radars that cannot display. True vectors allow users to determine the aspect of a target at a glance, something otherwise requires manual plotting. Relative vectors provide, at a glance, information about which vessels pose a collision risk; a RV pointing at the centre of the Radar screen indicates a risk of collision. All the information pertaining to a target is also available numerically, but when tracking multiple targets this information distracts the user from the image. With proper training, viewing vectors is much safer.

Manufacturers use a variety of acronyms for the small crafts or yacht, e.g. MARPA (mini or manual ARPA, depending on which company you talk to) is the dominant one. MARPA, ATA (automatic tracking aid), and ARP (automatic radar plotting) all function similarly to ARPA. The major difference of this Radar plotting aids may not be fully equivalent to all ARPA performance standard of IMO approved type which is a mandatory requirement for large ocean-going ships. Therefore, they are less expensive for small craft.
