= Wari culture =

Pre-Inca Culture, c. 500 BCE–1000 CE

Huari Culture Wari
- 5th century–10th century
- Expansion and area of influence of the Wari Empire around 800 AD
- Capital: Huari
- Common languages: Aymara, others (Quechua, Culli, Quignam, Mochica)
- Religion: Andean beliefs (Staff God)
- Historical era: Middle Horizon
  - Established: 5th century
  - Disestablished: 10th century
Preceded by
Moche culture
Lima culture
Nazca culture
Succeeded by
Wari Empire
- Today part of: Peru

The Wari (Spanish: Huari) were a Middle Horizon civilization that flourished in the south-central Andes and coastal area of modern-day Peru, from about 500 to 1000 AD. At their height, they formed the Wari Empire.

Wari, as the former capital city was called, is located 11 km (6.8 mi) north-east of the modern city of Ayacucho, Peru. This city was the center of a civilization that covered much of the highlands and coast of modern Peru. The best-preserved remnants, besides the Wari ruins, are the recently discovered Northern Wari ruins near the city of Chiclayo, and Cerro Baúl in Moquegua. Also well-known are the Wari ruins of Pikillaqta ("Flea Town"), a short distance south-east of Cuzco en route to Lake Titicaca.

However, there is still a debate whether the Wari dominated the Central Coast or the polities on the Central Coast were commercial states capable of interacting with the Wari people without being politically dominated by them.

== History ==
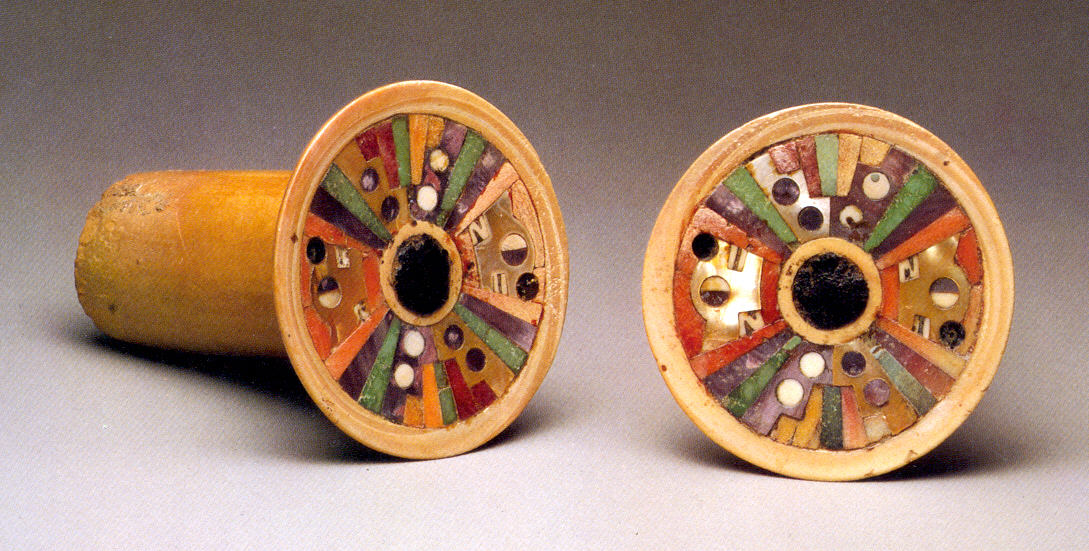
Wari earflare pair — bone, ivory and semi-precious stones. A famous artifact from the Metropolitan Museum of Art.

Archaeological evidence points toward the Wari empire taking control of a number of small villages in Peru's Carahuarazo Valley in approximately 600 A.D., during the empire's initial expansion. The incursion caused a number of the valley's existing villages to be abandoned, with one partially destroyed to make room for a Wari administrative center known as Jincamocco. The Wari introduced terracing agriculture to the area, shifting the staple crops of the valley from tubers to both tubers and maize. Wari storage structures have been found in the area, seemingly "paired" with some of remaining villages' agricultural sites; these were likely used to store both staple crops. Wari occupation of the Carahuarazo Valley lasted until roughly 800 A.D., leading to the abandonment of most of the valley's sites after that time.

Early on, the Wari expanded their territory to include the ancient oracle center of Pachacamac, though it seems to have remained largely autonomous. Later, the Wari became dominant in much of the territory of the earlier Moche and later Chimu cultures. The reason for this expansion has been debated; it is believed to have been driven by religious conversion, the spread of agricultural knowledge (specifically terrace agriculture), or military conquest. Militarism and the associated threat/violence that comes with it has consistently played a part in the expansion and maintenance of ancient empires with Wari being of no exception. Evidence of the violence present in Wari culture is most visible at the city of Conchopata.

As a result of centuries of drought, the Wari culture began to deteriorate around 800 AD. Archeologists have determined that the city of Wari was dramatically depopulated by 1000 AD, although it continued to be occupied by a small number of descendant groups. Buildings in Wari and in other government centers had doorways that were deliberately blocked up, as if the Wari intended to return, someday when the rains returned. By the time this happened, though, the Wari had faded from history. In the meantime, the dwindling residents of the Wari cities ceased all major construction. Archaeological evidence shows significant levels of interpersonal violence, suggesting that warfare and raiding increased amongst rival groups upon the collapse of the Wari state structure. With the collapse of the Wari, the Late Intermediate Period is said to begin.

== Government ==
Little is known about the details of the Wari administrative structure, as they did not appear to use a form of written record. Instead, they used a tool called khipu, or "knot record." Despite being most widely known for its use in Inca accounting, many scholars believe that the earliest use of it as a recording tool happened in Wari. Archaeologists, however, still rely on homogeneous administrative architecture and evidence of significant social stratification to help better understand the complex sociopolitical hierarchy of Wari.

The discovery in early 2013 of an undisturbed royal tomb, El Castillo de Huarmey, offers new insight into the social and political influence of the Wari during this period. The variety and extent of the burial items accompanying the three royal women indicate a culture with significant material wealth and the power to dominate a significant part of northern coastal Peru for many decades.

Another example of burials helping to establish social stratification is in the city of Conchopata where the remains of more than 200 individuals have been found. This city is located about 10 km from the capital city. Prior to its excavation, the city was believed to be that of potters, but the burials studied instead showed that there were servants, middle-class, elite, and even perhaps low kings or governors occupying the city. Further investigations on a random selection of the burials from the site have shown that 26 percent of both male and female adult crania studied had at least one posterior wound, while only females had been subject to anterior wounds. The different levels of violence based on sex is evidence of some type of systematic hierarchy.

== Architecture ==
During its expansion period, the Wari state established architecturally distinctive administrative centers in many of its provinces, but they often did not have formal planning as many other Andean cities did. These centers are clearly different from the architecture of Tiwanaku, which is believed to have been a more federalized state by some scholars (such as John W. Janusek). Wari architecture was most often made of rough fieldstones that had been coated in white plaster. The compounds were usually large, rectangular enclosures with no windows, just a few entries, and the sites had no central place for people to gather for rituals or ceremonies. This is in almost direct contrast with Tiwanaku where there was a more open architectural plan that could easily accommodate multiple people at once. A form of architecture distinctive to Wari was the use of D-shaped structures. These structures were commonly used for temples and were relatively small at only 10 meters. Using administrative centers like their temples, the Wari greatly influenced the surrounding countryside. Scholars were able to look at the Inca to reconstruct some of the architecture of the Wari. Along the Inca highway system, several Wari provincial sites were found, suggesting that the Wari used a similar road network. They also created new fields with terraced field technology, which the Inca also drew inspiration from.

== Social life ==
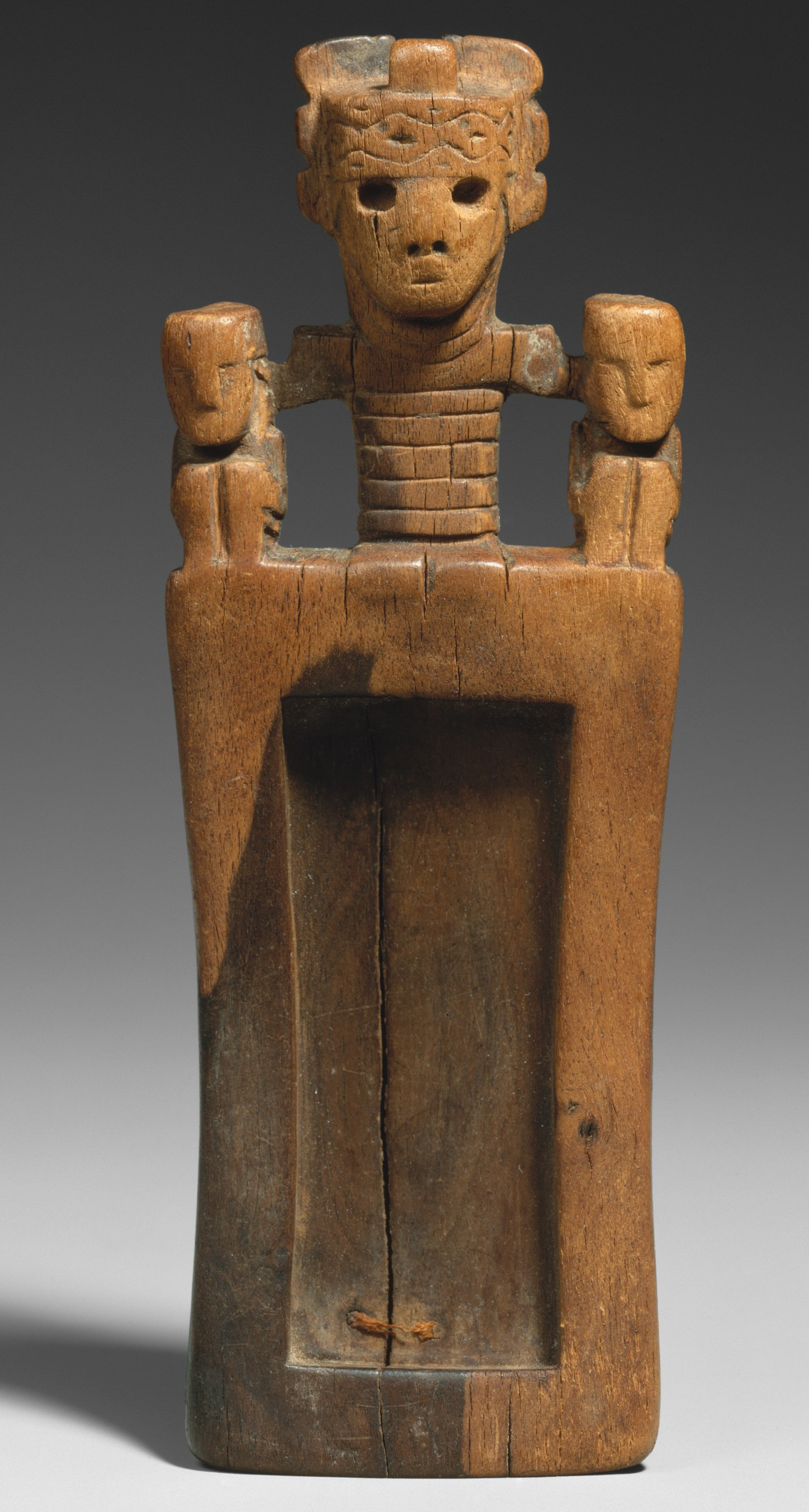
Wooden Wari snuff tray, 4th–10th century

Based on remains from multiple Wari sites, archaeologists have determined that feasts and offerings of food were a powerful driving force in the social life of the Wari. Multiple instances of camelid remains found in the province of Cotocotuyoc point toward the usage of such animals as symbols of social capital, especially because they were uncommon in the area. Some camelid remains were found devoid of cut marks and stacked on top of human bones, leading researchers to think they were intentionally not fully eaten to display the feast's host's wealth, in a process known as ritual wasteful consumption.

== Religion ==
The Wari worshipped the Staff god, a chief deity in many Andean cultures. Some of the oldest depictions of the Staff god appear on Wari textiles and pottery urns, estimated to be over 3,000 years old. Some scholars believe that the Wari Staff god was a predecessor of the three Incan principal gods, Sun, Moon, and Thunder.

The Wari practiced animal sacrifice. Complete skeletal remains of a young camelid and thirty-two guinea pigs were found buried in a "lineage house" in the city of Conchopata, ten kilometers from the capital city of Wari. The complete nature of the remains, as well as the age of the camelid, point toward the animals being sacrificed at the end of the Ayachuco valley's rainy season.

== Art ==
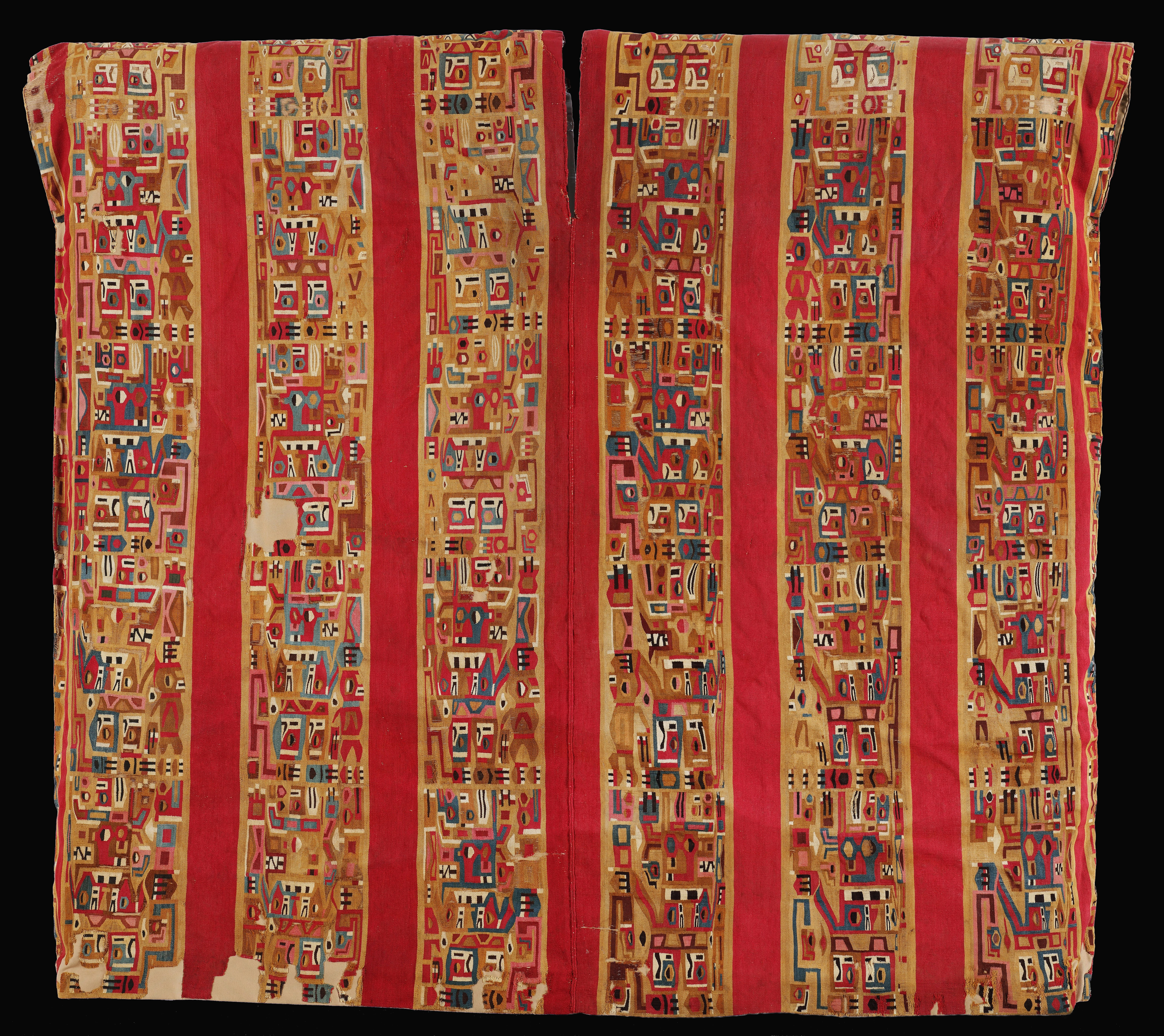
Huari style - Unku textile with designs of stylized figures

The Wari are particularly known for their textiles, which were well-preserved in desert burials. The standardization of textile motifs serves as artistic evidence of state control over elite art production in the Wari state. Surviving textiles include tapestries, hats and tunics for high-ranking officials. There are between six and nine miles of thread in each tunic, and they often feature highly abstracted versions of typical Andean artistic motifs, such as the Staff God. It is possible that these abstract designs served "a mysterious or esoteric code to keep out uninitiated foreign subjects" and that the geometric distortions made the wearer's chest appear larger to reflect their high rank.

The Wari also produced highly sophisticated metalwork and ceramics, with similar designs to the textiles. The most common metals used were silver and copper, though gold Wari artifacts also survive. The most common metal objects were qiru, bowls, jewelry, mummy bundle masks, mantle pins, and sheet figures who demonstrate how the tunics were worn. Ceramics were typically polychrome and frequently depicted food and animals. Conchopata appears to have been the ceramic center of Wari culture given the high quantities of pottery tools, firing rooms, pit kilns, potsherds, and ceramic molds. In one of the D-shaped temples at Conchopata, there were large smashed chicha vessels on the floor and human heads placed as offerings as a form of human sacrifice.

== Gallery ==
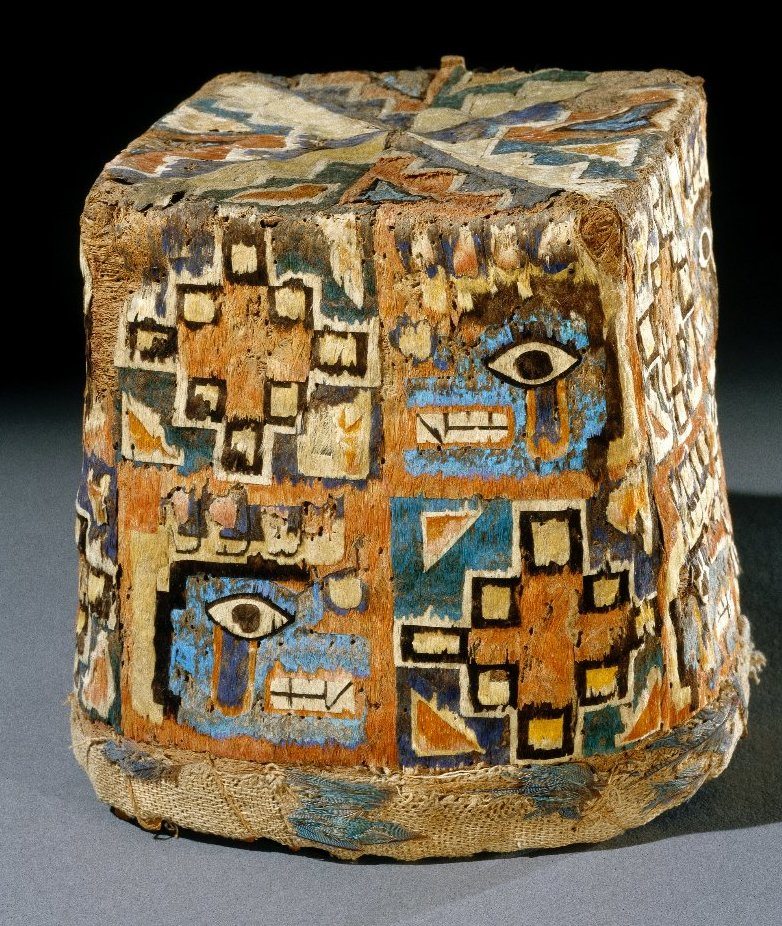
Four-cornered hat, 650–1000 AD, Brooklyn Museum

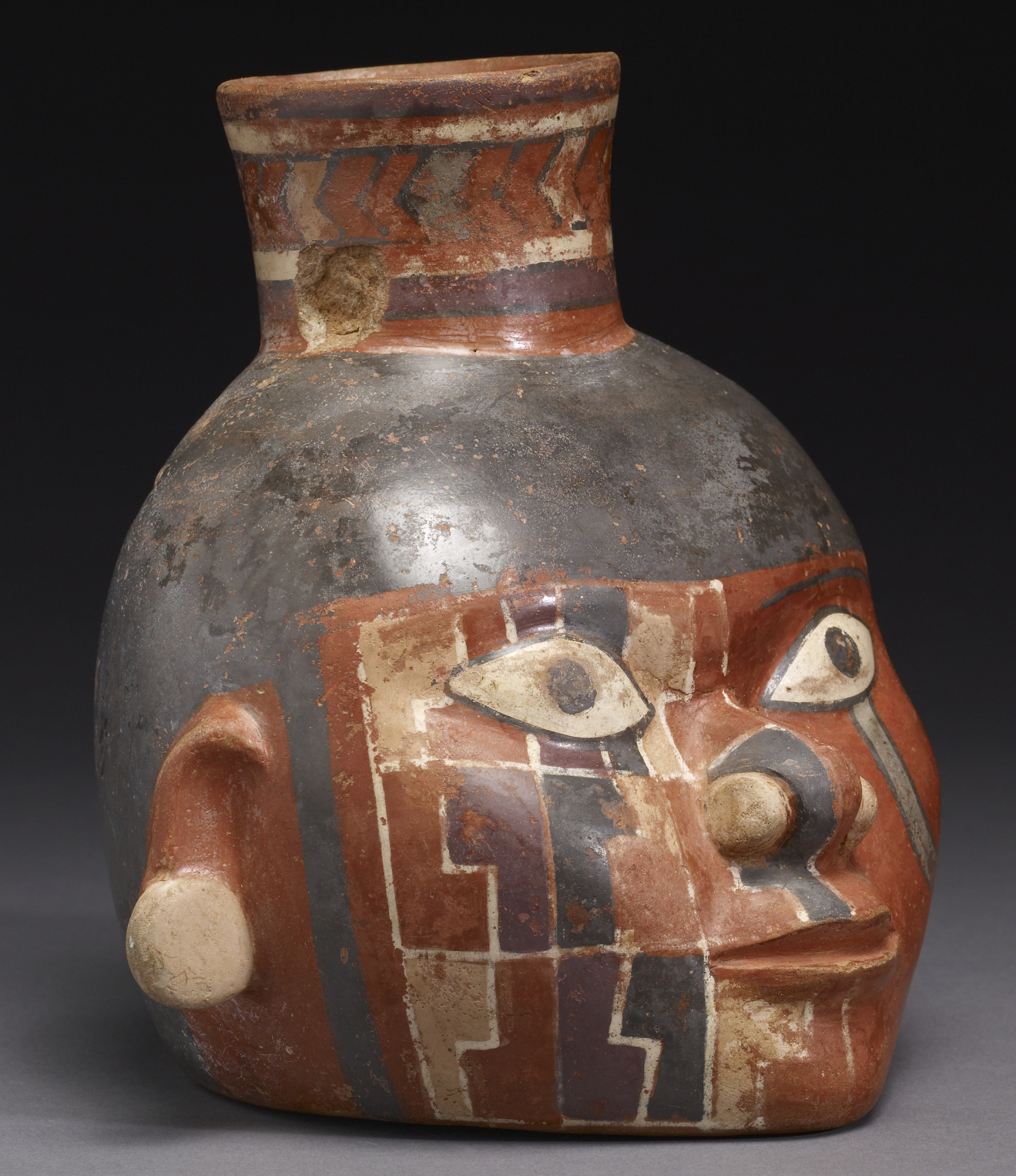
Huari earthenware pot with painted design, 650–800 AD (Middle Horizon)

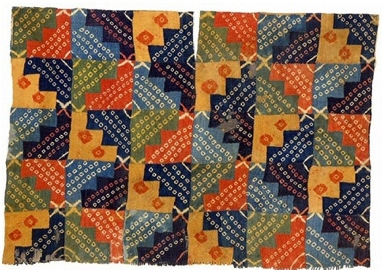
Wari tunic, Peru, 750–950 AD: This tunic is made of 120 separate small pieces of cloth, each individually tie-dyed. Ceramics of the period depict high-status men wearing this style of tunic.

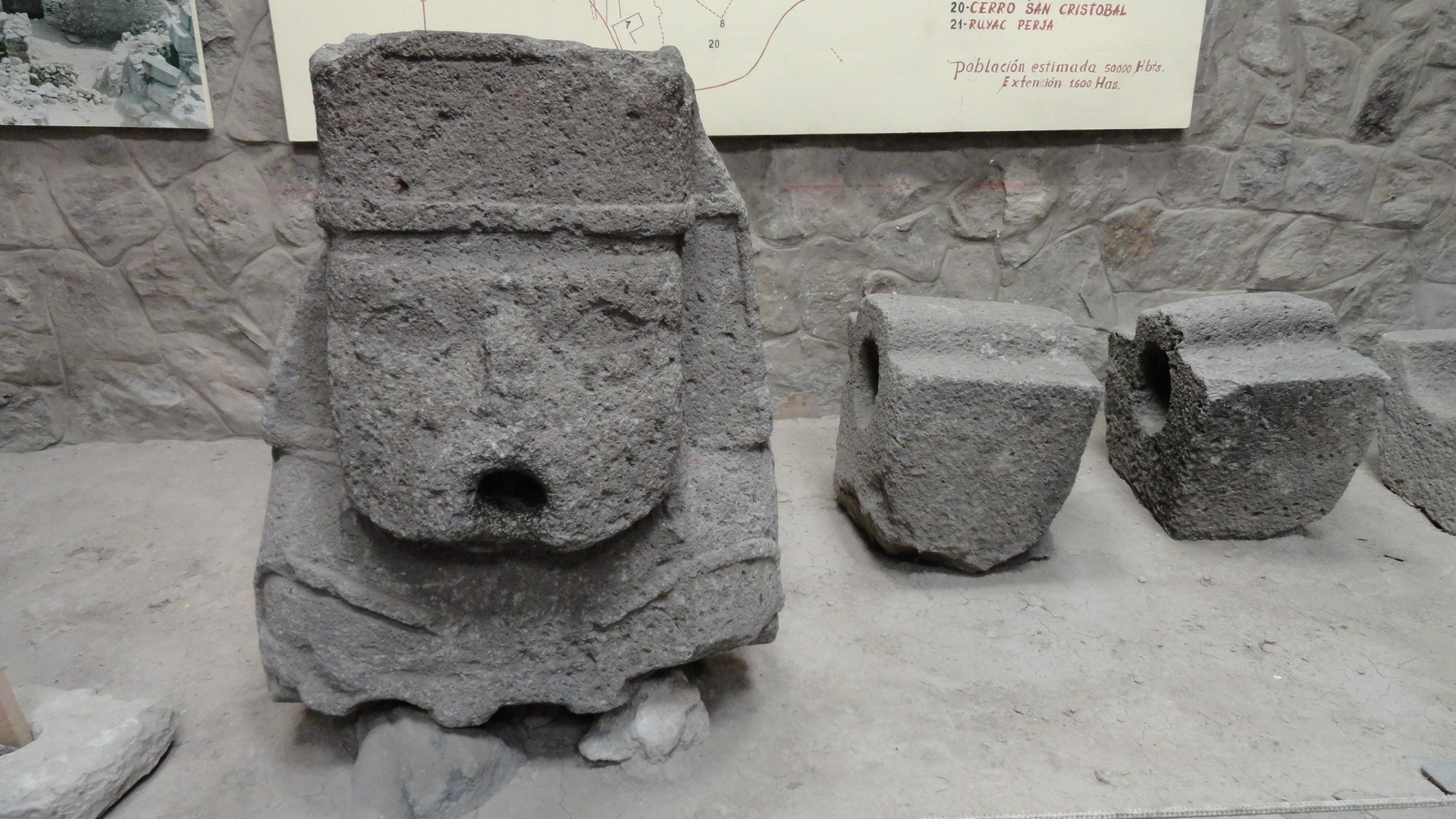
Monoliths Wari

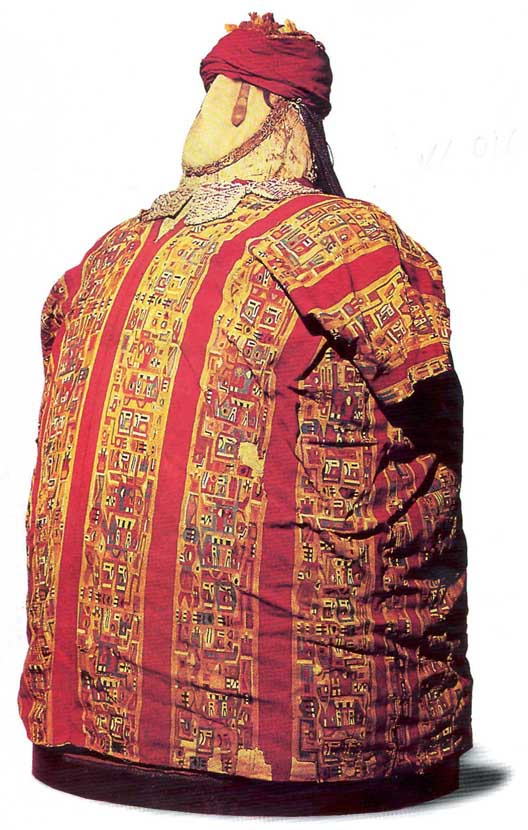
Wari funeral bundle

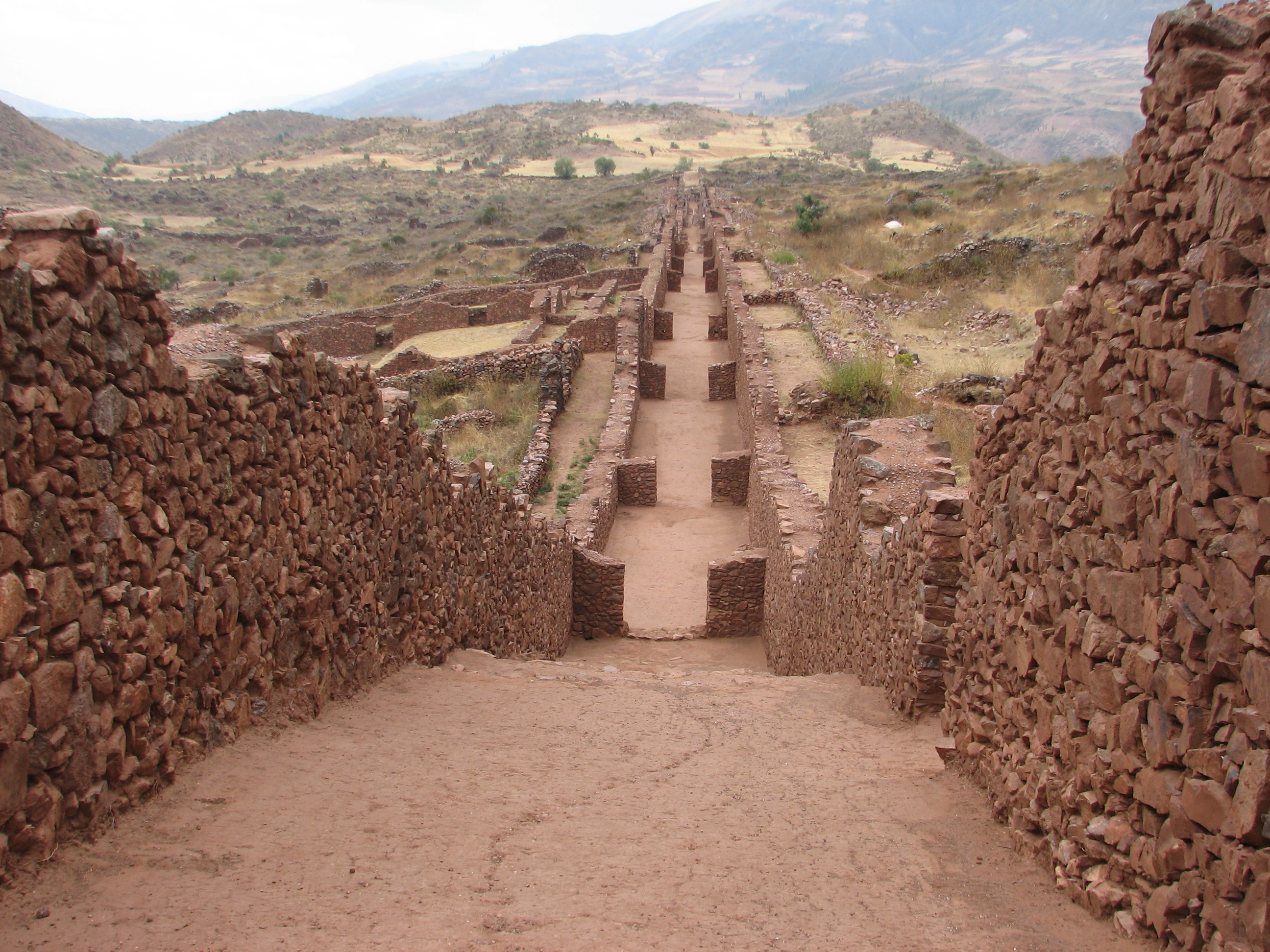
Pikillaqta administrative center, built by the Wari civilization in Cusco

== See also ==
- Choquepuquio
- Ollantaytambo
- Pocra culture
- Tiwanaku polity
- Wilcahuaín
