= List of Norte Chico archaeological sites =

The following is a list of archaeological sites of the Norte Chico civilization (also Caral civilization). The Norte Chico comprises four coastal river valleys.

Site Name	River	Earliest date, cal BC	Site Name	River	Earliest date, cal BC
Porvenir	Fortaleza	3720	Vinto Alto	Pativilca	2580
Cerro Lampay	Fortaleza	N/A	Huayto	Pativilca	2270
Caballete	Fortaleza	3120	Aspero	Supe	N/A
Cerro Blanco 1	Fortaleza	1720	Piedra Parada	Supe	N/A
Cerro Blanco 2	Fortaleza	2120	Era de Pando	Supe	N/A
Huaricanga	Fortaleza	3750	Lurihuasi	Supe	N/A
Cerro de la Cruz	Fortaleza	N/A	Miraya	Supe	N/A
Shaura	Fortaleza	2030	Pueblo Nuevo	Supe	N/A
Punta y Suela	Pativilca	9170	Caral	Supe	N/A
Upaca	Pativilca	2740	Alpacoto	Supe	N/A
Potao	Pativilca	1480	Peñico	Supe	N/A
Carreteria	Pativilca	2180	Huacachi	Supe	N/A
Pampa San Jose	Pativilca	2230	Huaural	Huaura	N/A
