= El Paraíso, Peru =

Archaeological site in Peru

El Paraíso
- Chuquitanta
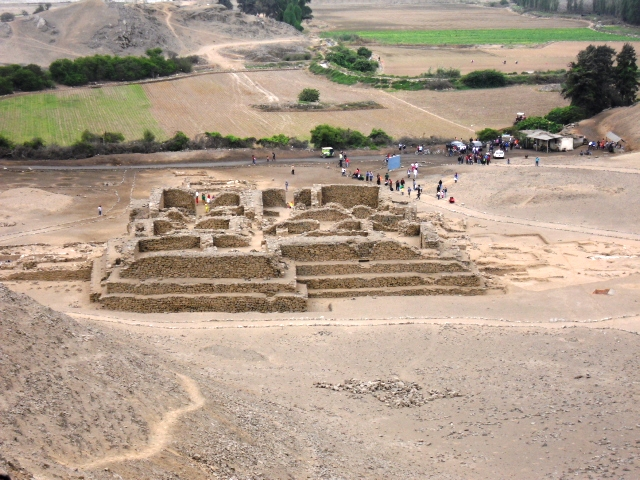
- Main pyramid at El Paraíso.

- Location within Peru
- 11°57′14″S 77°7′6″W
- Periods: Cotton Preceramic
- Location: San Martin de Porres, Chillon River Valley, Peru
- Region: Chillon River Valley

History
- Built: 3790 cal. B.P.
- Abandoned: 3065 cal B.P.

Site notes
- Excavation dates: 1960s, Frédérick Engel; 1980s Jeffrey Quilter
- Archaeologists: Jeffrey Quilter, Ripon College, Wisconsin ?
- Responsible body: Ministry of Culture, Peru

El Paraíso (Spanish pronunciation: [el paɾaˈiso], "The Paradise") or Chuquitanta (Quechua chuqui lance or metal, tanta bread) are the moderns names of a Late Preceramic (3500–1800 BC) archaeological site located in the Chillón Valley on the central coast of Peru. The site is situated several kilometers north of Lima, the capital of Peru, in the San Martin de Porres District in the Province of Lima. El Paraíso is one of the largest settlements from this period, encompassing over 58 hectares of land.

Other major centers from this period include Aspero and Caral on the northern coast in the Supé Valley. Sizable centers can be found in different ecozones, from the coast to inland areas. Stanish concluded that this was a time when settlements were broadly distributed, located at various distances from the coast allowing access to a variety of marine and agricultural resources.

== Historical occupation ==
The occupation period for El Paraíso was relatively short, lasting approximately 300 to 400 years, from 3790 cal BP to 3,065 cal BP (calibrated radiocarbon years before present). While it is generally accepted as a Preceramic site by most archaeologists, the occupation appears to have continued into the early Initial Period.

Also known as the Cotton Preceramic (a term coined by Fréderic Engel in 1957) site, the Preceramic designation is disputed by some researchers, especially Pozorski and Pozorski, who argue that it actually was occupied primarily in the early Initial Period, by which time many areas had ceramics. Since it is not associated with ceramics during its main occupation sequence, they consider El Paraíso to be an example of an "aceramic" site instead.

The purpose for the centre is unclear. The lack of substantial midden deposits in recognized dump areas, designated burial areas or cemeteries, and thick wall construction consisting of stone quarried in local hills, suggests that it was not a residential or domestic complex. Evidence instead promotes the contention that El Paraíso was either an economic or religious centre, and possibly both. As well, it may also have been a centralized hub for control and development of cotton rather than food production.

Archaeological findings suggest a possible connection to the Kotosh Religious Tradition of the Central Highlands (es:Cordillera Central (Perú)).

The site is notable for having a U-shape creating a 7 ha plaza; this layout resembles many nearby sites located in the Chillón-Rimac-Lurin Valleys from the later Ceramic Period, and therefore El Paraíso maybe a possible precursor to later architectural developments.

Stanish suggests that the social organization required to build El Paraíso represents what is known as a chiefdom level society, with no central polity but a series of autonomous settlements and regions that allowed for the collaboration of regional groups.

Unlike Aspero and Caral, which were part of a developed socio-economic interaction region (known as Norte Chico civilization) during the Late Preceramic, El Paraiso was part of a group of regionally isolated centers that developed along various parts of the Peruvian coast. Moseley considers it a major supporter of his Maritime Foundations Theory which argues that a heavy reliance on rich marine resources were instrumental in the early establishment of social complexity in the region.

As the name implies, the Preceramic period in the Andes is marked by the absence of ceramic material. This was a period of general growing social complexity along the Peruvian coast, which saw the introduction and increase in centers with monumental architecture, including indications for increasing trade and greater regional interactions, both up and down the coast, and between groups in low and high elevations. Population estimates range from between 1500 and 3000 people.

El Paraíso does not appear to have suffered any catastrophic final event, but shows evidence of gradual and relatively rapid abandonment in the early Initial Period; there is no indication for the cause for its decline and there is no evidence for a reoccupation phase.

== Research history ==
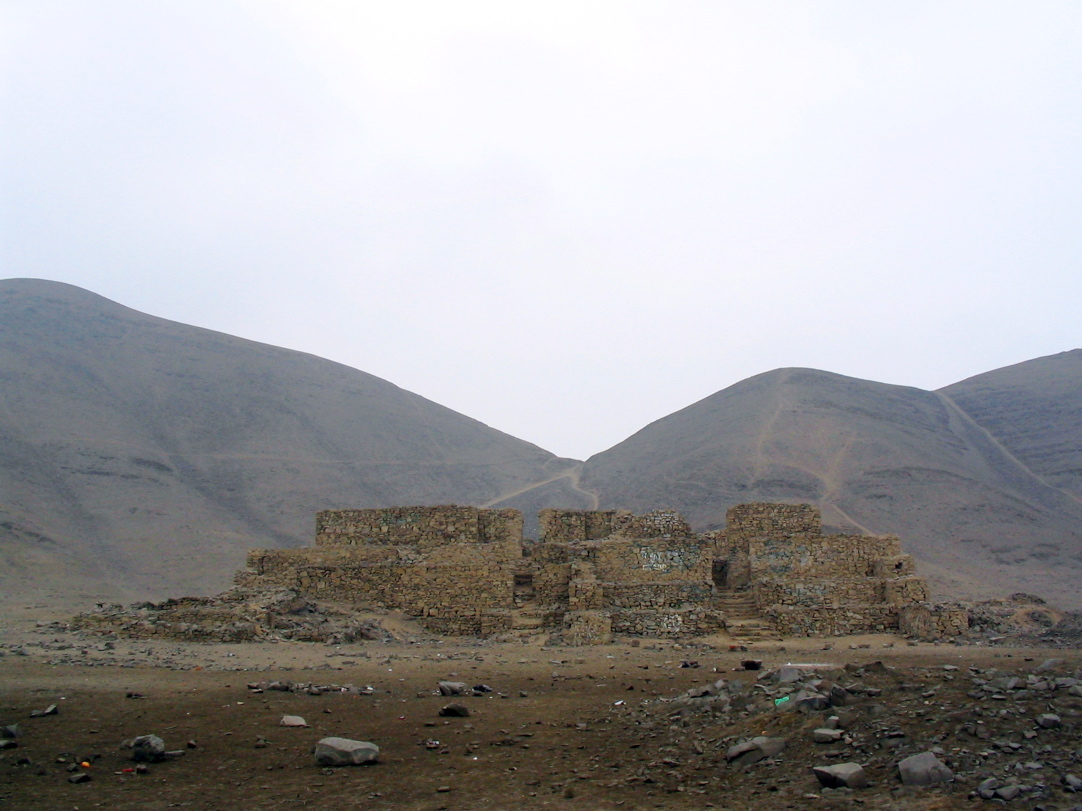
El Paraiso

- 1950s

Louis Stumer completes survey work in the Chillón Valley; names the site Chuquitanta, after a nearby hacienda

- 1964

Thomas C. Patterson and Edward P. Lanning first publish on the site, noting it as Preceramic

- 1965

Fréderick Engel conducts test excavations on Units I- VII; maps the site; restores the most southerly building, Unit I which also is the primary focus of his excavation work Renames the site El Paraíso, which becomes the official name and is used by the Instituto Nacional de Cultura. Confirms the site as Preceramic, based on textile remnants and lack of ceramics

- 1968

Thomas C. Patterson and Michael E. Moseley identify the existence of between nine and thirteen buildings

- 1982

Jeffrey Quilter begins the first of several field-seasons of a multi-disciplinary study, El Proyecto Bajo Valle del Chillón

- 1983

Jeffrey Quilter concentrates the project efforts on El Paraíso for the purpose of establishing a chronology, and establishing a better understanding of the architecture and subsistence economy of the site

=== El Proyecto Bajo Valle del Chillón (The Lower Chillón Valley Project) ===
- Jeffrey Quilter, principal investigator/field director
- Lucy Salazar de Burger, assistant field director
- Deborah House, laboratory director
- Elizabeth S. Wing and Daniel Sandweiss, faunal analysis
- Deborah Pearsall and Bernardino Ojeda, floral analysis
- Bernardino Ojeda, mapping

== Site excavations ==
The importance of El Paraíso as the "largest and earliest example of monumental architecture in the New World", has not resulted in a significant amount of archaeological investigation. The first mention of the site was in the 1950s when Louis Stumer surveyed the Chillón valley and includes it in his report. He initially named it Chuquitanta, after a local hacienda, however this name was later changed to El Paraíso by Fréderick Engel.

Early work suggested to excavators that the site was Preceramic, a fact that was later confirmed by radio carbon dating done by Jeffrey Quilter, who placed it in the latter part of the Preceramic.

There have been two independent excavation projects. The first excavations were done in the early and mid-1960s by Engel. This was followed up in the early to mid-1980s by Quilter, who headed a multi-year, multi-discipline orientated research project in the lower Chillon valley, El Proyecto Bajo Valle del Chillón. After a more regional focus in the first year, he concentrated subsequent efforts on El Paraíso itself.

There has been some uncertainty over the number of buildings on the site, primarily due to recent surface disturbance. For example, Unit VI appears to have been transected by a tractor since the 1960s when Patterson first reported it as a complete structure. In 1983, a surface survey determined that there were eleven buildings in total, seven of which were still free standing structures; though archaeologists are uncertain if more buildings once stood on the site.

=== Excavation work by Engel ===
Excavation work begun by Engel was concentrated on Unit I who also eventually partially rebuilt some of the walls. This building was revisited by Quilter in 1984, who also conducted excavations in Units II and IV, as well as several locations outside structures.

A variety of artifactual material has been recovered from the various excavation work detailing a wide array of subsistence, social and ideological insight. There are five burials associated with the site, all found by Engel.

An adult (burial 2) and the remains of an infant (burial 3) were found next to the south exterior wall of Unit I; the infant was wrapped in textiles dated to the Ceramic Period. Another adult (burial 1) was found on the west side of Unit I and a young infant (burial 4) was found at the base of the south wall of the west wing of Unit I. The final adult (burial 5) was found on the north side of Unit V.

The burials generally appear to intrude into occupation midden deposits, and researchers have determined it difficult to make particular inferences from them; only noting that in later Andean periods, child burials were often associated with fertility rituals.

Unit II produced a variety of remains, including cloth and textile fragments, and other domestic refuse. Unit IV produced almost exclusively food remains, and no other artifacts of consequence were found.

It appears that the inhabitants of El Paraíso buried most of their garbage in pits, either outside and often in association with structures, being either behind or beside buildings, or inside as room fill.

=== Textiles ===
Textile fragments consisted primarily of cotton yarns that were in natural shades, from white to dark brown, but others were colored in deep reds and two shades of blue. Other centers at this time revealed that dying cotton was not uncommon as yellow, red, bright emerald green and orange dyed textile remains have been found in such Preceramic sites as Huaca Prieta, Los Gavilanes, La Galgada and Asia (Peru).

As well, two objects were found with an inlay of dark blue stone, resembling lapis lazuli. Other items recovered during excavation work include mats, looped bags, nets, wood and bone artifacts, grinding stones, stone beads, spindle whorls, crude bifaces, a polished stone mirror, and figurine fragments.

=== Avian remains ===
Perhaps one of the more interesting discoveries were the avian remains found in Unit II. The skeletal remains of an immature sea bird was found, careful positioned with small fish and crab remains, in association with a right handprint pressed into a large piece of mortar. Another bird skeleton was found along with carefully arranged sticks parallel to one another. Two more sets of avian related materials were found: a large amount of bird guano and a scattering of bird down.

The bird guano was found in Room 2W in Unit II. In the same room there was also found colourful bird down and feathers, with a minimum of two species represented.

The remains of bird nesting boxes, special feed mix and stone bowls were found in the Preceramic site of Casa Grande, Peru; researchers suggest this was an aviary where birds were raised for use in sacrifices.

While it is impossible to say that birds were being raised at El Paraíso, it does indicate that they were being brought into the rooms, possibly for ceremonial purposes.

The room at El Paraíso also contained cotton and wood remains, including needles, suggesting that this may have been a place where feathers were incorporated into textile manufacture for ritual and prestige items.

Finally, Room 1, closely situated to Room 2W, had a scattering of colored down on the floor, similar to a scattering found at the Preceramic site of La Galgada.

Other evidence of ritual was found inside a wall in Unit I; a large stone offering resembling an Inka huacas (rock or other natural object believed to represent ancestral corporate groups). It was covered in red pigment, wrapped in cotton cloth and found in association with gourds containing food remains and a miniature schicra, a bag normally filled with stones but in this case filled with white ovoid lime cakes wrapped in leaves (possibly pacay). This suggests that leaf chewing with lime is an old tradition and reminiscent of the later adoption of coca use.

=== Ceramics ===
While there is a surface scattering of ceramics, dating from the early Initial or Ceramic period, this appears to have been an ephemeral occupation. There is no indication that it was linked with any significant activity, rather continued sporadic or even squatter-type use.

=== Early temple remains discovered (2013) ===
A news report in February 2013 of an expedition led by Mark Guillen stated that the remains of a temple had been found in the right wing of the main pyramid. Preliminary dating suggests that this could date to as early as 3000 BC. Built of stone, it measures 6.82 by 8.04 m (22.4 by 26.4 ft) and its yellow clay walls still show traces of red paint. Commenting on a hearth found in the centre of the temple, Mark Guillen said ""The main characteristic of their religion was the use of fire, which burnt in the centre...The smoke allowed the priests to connect with their gods."

=== Latest discoveries ===
In the last Research, Conservation and Value enhancement Project of the El Paraiso Monumental Archaeological Zone, in 2016, a 4,000-year-old cactus was found, possibly of the hallucinogenic species San Pedro (Echinopsis pachanoi), about 30 centimeters long, in perfect condition. That same year, archaeologist Dayanna Carbonel made another important discovery in Unit IV, a funerary bundle of approximately 3,700 years old, with a woman baptized as Eva Lucia, The Lady of El Paraíso, apparently belonging to a high social status, due to the funerary context in which it was found.

== Site ==
Approximately two kilometers inland on the Rio Chillón flood plain, El Paraiso is surrounded by over 90 hectares of arable land and 150 hectares of lowlands capable of sustaining irrigation supported agriculture.

It is just one of the six Preceramic sites in the Ancón-Chillón Valley, which also include the site of Pampa de los Perros, and Buena Vista.

Ancon (archaeological site) is another important site in the area.

El Paraiso is located just north of the other Preceramic and Ceramic sites, such as La Florida, which is situated in the nearby Rimac and Lurin valley river systems.

=== Dating ===
The occupation of El Paraiso is dated from 3790 BP to 3065 BP, which would date the site to the Preceramic Period. The oldest dates come from Unit 4, with calibrated dates coming from wood charcoal as late as 2540 B.C.

Unit 1, which was excavated and reconstructed by Frederic Engal, features arguably the most defining structure within El Paraiso. Dates from Unit 1 range from 2320 B.C. to 1105 B.C. Most samples come from room 2, which is believed to be the oldest and largest room in the Unit.

Most radiocarbon dates come from wood charcoal samples from midden, though there are two samples of reed fragments from pit 3 in Unit 4.

Thin layers of much later material have also been found on several sites within El Paraiso. These have been dated to belong to the Early Intermediate Period about 200 B.C. to 550 A.D. These remains show a short term use of the site during this time and can be easily separated from Preceramic materials, although they demonstrate that the abandoned site was revisited in later times.

=== Architecture ===
==== Site plan ====
Architecture has been the subject of considerable focus at El Paraíso. In 1965, Engle identified seven major structures and designated them Units I-VII. This naming convention was continued by Quilter's research team when five more structures were identified in the 1983 survey of the site. Unfortunately for archaeologists, modern machinery, roads, and irrigation canals have disturbed the ground in the immediate vicinity of the features, especially in the western half of the site. Because of this, the exact nature of the relationship between Units III and IX is unknown; additionally, Quilter has speculated that Unit III, a structure identified as a rubble pile, may in fact be two structures that have collapsed on themselves. In the eastern part of the site, a brick storage yard has been constructed on the remains of Unit VI, one of the two largest structures at the site; preliminary investigation suggests that the structure once extended under the brick yard.

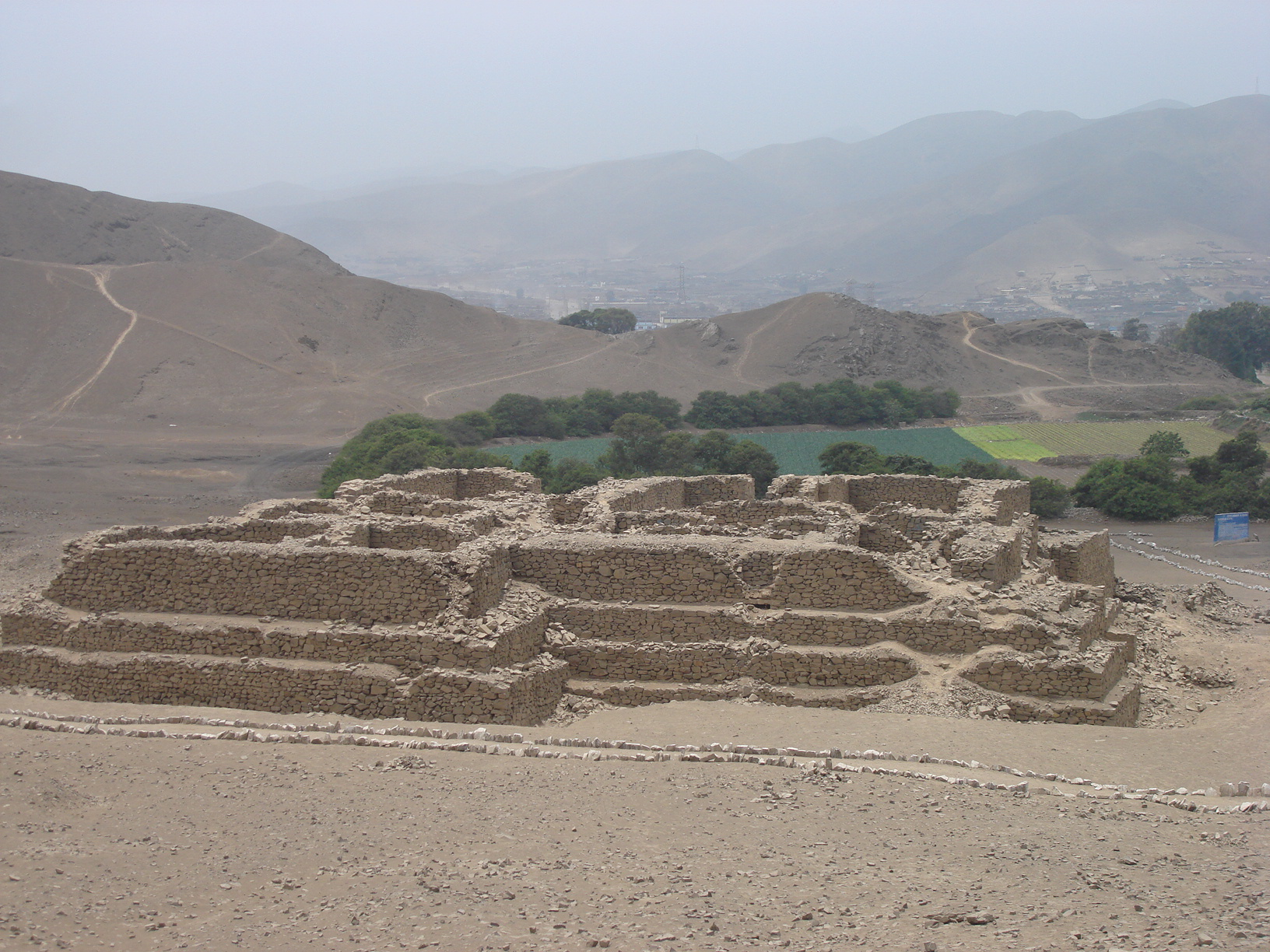
Huaca El Paraíso

Comparing the general layout of the site to other pre-ceramic sites in the region, such as Aspero and Rio Seco, reveals some interesting dissimilarities. Those sites are organized in a typical "U-shape," with monumental structures forming the sides and bottom of the "U". The structure at that bottom of the "U" is the largest in area and height, and creates a focus for the site at one end. At El Paraíso, the structure at the bottom of the "U" is neither the largest nor tallest. Instead the structures forming the sides of the U are larger than those at the bottom of the "U," and are roughly the same in height and length.

The geographic position of El Paraíso is also different from the other Preceramic period Peruvian sites. Those sites are situated overlooking the largest fields in the area, and with a view of the Pacific Ocean. In contrast, the view of the ocean at El Paraíso is blocked by hills, and the site does not overlook the largest adjacent fields. Coprolites from El Paraíso indicate a higher riverine component to the diet at the site; the positioning of the site farther from the ocean, and with no view shed coupled with the dietary data may suggest an inland focus at this site but this hypothesis is untested.

==== Unit I ====
The structure referred to as Unit I is located at the southern extremity of the site. It is built of rough trimmed stones quarried from a nearby hill side, assembled with coarse fill and mortar, and then covered in plaster. The unit consists of four tiered levels, corresponding to between four and six building phases. Direct corroboration of the phases of construction has been hampered by reconstruction during the excavations in the 1960s. Consecutive construction phases saw rooms filled in with fibre bags filled rocks, or shicra. Internal doorways and stairways within the multi-room structure indicate a changing pattern of use throughout the occupation.

Room 2 is the oldest in this complex, and an 80 x 80 cm excavation unit located in the north east corner contained four distinct floors, each separated by black midden deposits. Three dates are associated with this room, the earliest level is date to 2,185 to 1,685 cal BC and the upper most level is dated to 1,420–1,105 cal BC. The last phase suggests ceremonial use; the most notable finding in this building was the ritual offering placed inside one of the walls.

Quilter has suggested that there is a complex dynamic of control of space at this site. The northwest rooms of Unit I are accessed easily from the outside of the structure with wide staircases, but the rooms making up the southern half of the complex can only be accessed through a single staircase on the east side or through long narrow hallways along the western side of the structure.

==== Unit II ====
Like Unit I, multiple plaster floors and evidence of multiple construction phases is found at Unit II. The upper level of the excavation revealed a clay floor, with ceramic dating to the Intermediate period. Deeper in the excavation, two parallel lines of stone (possibly walls or foundations) were encountered. Unique engaged columns were found in two of the walls of one of the smaller rooms in the northwest quadrant of Unit II. Features like these have not been observed at other preceramic sites on the Peruvian coast.

Room 1, a 5 m square room was also excavated. The upper levels revealed ceramic sherds, cloth fragments, and domestic refuse suggesting a mixed use during occupation. A small central hearth was found beneath. One of the rooms had two short pillars or columns conjoined to opposite walls. A skeleton of an immature bird, small fish vertebrae, and crab were found as well. A large quantity of bird guano, avian skeletal material, and feathers were found in the lower layers but no associated remains of nesting boxes or other structures indicating aviculture. However, the abundance does indicate that birds were important at this site in either a ritual, production or consumption context. Other artifacts found in this room also included cotton, wool, needles and nine adobe bricks. The mix of artifact types suggests multiple activity patterns.

==== Unit IV ====
Unit IV is a single storied structure that showed evidence of looting. An excavation unit was placed immediately adjacent to that pit. This unit produced a clay floor, and a large amount of faunal material. Rather than an occupation site, Quilter speculates that this Unit may be a feasting site associated with Unit I.

=== 2013 damage ===
In late June, 2013, one of the pyramids at El Paraíso complex was completely destroyed. Property developers used bulldozers to knock-down the building, then set the remains ablaze. Police prevented the destruction of another 11 pyramids at the site. Prior to its destruction, the pyramid had a footprint of approximately 2,500 square meters and was 6 meters high. Criminal charges will be lodged against the companies associated to this incident, identified as Alisol and Provelanz.

== Marine resources ==
Maritime-adapted hunter-gatherers are people who have learned to harvest the resources of the sea and for whom marine foods make up the majority of their diets. In the material left by ancient people, archaeologists look for the kinds of food people were eating as well as the tools that they used to collect and process that food. In cultural deposits, if the remains of fish, shellfish, marine mammals and seabirds make up a majority of the faunal assemblage, and tools used to fish, hunt marine mammals and seabirds are found in the same context, the people would be considered to be maritime-adapted. Such is the case for the El Paraiso people.

It is significant that the El Paraiso people were maritime-adapted because the finds on the site provide the first direct evidence for the theory that the early civilization of Peru was founded on seafood resources and not upon domesticated plants and animals. Analysis of faunal remains showed that fish was the primary source of protein with anchovy as the most common fish. Clams were the most common molluscs but they represented a far less significant protein source. Analysis of ten coprolites showed that eight contained evidence of bony fish and crawfish.

== Social structure ==
Normally the cold Humboldt Current flows from south to north bringing nutrient rich plankton and with it an abundance of marine life along the Peruvian coast. For a few years every century, an El Niño event occurs that reverses the flow of the current resulting in extremely poor marine catches. In response to such a period of extreme poverty of resources, a priestly class may have arisen to provide leadership and to appeal to the gods for relief. Archaeological evidence for the existence of such elites includes prestige burials with status items such as elaborate clothing and jewelry. Since no prestige burials were found at El Paraiso, there is no direct evidence for the existence of elites. However, indirect evidence for elites lies in the size and complexity of the site. Division of labour and specialization is implied by the existence of a brick factory and the use of rock filled fibre bags. From measuring the structures, archaeologists determined that El Paraiso was built according to a standardized set of engineering principles and measurements. This means that the El Paraiso site was carefully planned and was not just an ad hoc group of buildings. The conclusion is that a hierarchy was necessary to plan the site and to organize and coordinate a large labour force but the precise nature of the social organization remains elusive.

== Environment ==
El Paraíso is situated near the mouth of the Chillón River Valley and is 2 km from the Pacific Ocean. The temperature averages at 70 °F (21 °C) ranging from 55 °F (13 °C) to 90 °F (32 °C). El Paraíso is a river valley, which provides rich resources and is surrounded by barren desert land. There is a large flood plain near the site, which supports the growth of cotton fields. The Pacific Ocean brings the Humboldt Current through, creating rich and diverse marine life as well as lush tropical vegetation. The Humboldt Current most likely provided an extremely important food source before the advent of agriculture on the coast. Due to the lack of geologic and climatic evidence, it is assumed that the current climate on the Peru Coast is much the same as it was 4–5000 years ago. Studies conducted by Reitz et al. found mollusc remains which indicated at least two major El Niño events took place during the occupation of El Paraíso. El Niño would have affected the abundance, diversity and species composition of available resources. Most likely, El Niño only affected two separate human life-times and there is evidence that people subsisted from remaining marine life and the lush vegetation which El Niño brings to desert lands.

== Subsistence ==
The diet of the inhabitants of El Paraíso consisted of a mix of domesticated and gathered resources. El Paraíso had a rather simple subsistence economy. There is a high amount of non-domesticated foods found in the archaeological record, which supports that there were sufficient resources that could be hunted or collected. Wild plants such as the roots of sedges, groundcherry and cat tails may have accounted for a substantial portion of the diet. More than 90% of their protein came from marine resources, predominantly bony fishes and molluscs. Based on minimum number of individuals (MNI) results, the bony fishes mainly consisted of anchovies and the most common molluscs were mussels. There is almost a complete absence of terrestrial fauna found at El Paraíso. The predominance of marine resources may have prevented any need for a complex agricultural subsistence economy. Cotton was cultivated to provide nets for fishing as well as clothing for the inhabitants of El Paraíso showing a prominence in industrial agriculture in subsistence strategies.

== Agriculture ==
The integration of plant cultivation in El Paraíso occurred slowly as there were plentiful sources of marine organisms. Due to the evidence of such high marine resources, agriculture mainly acted as an industrial resource. The earliest cultigens are found to be cotton (Gossypium barbadense) and bottle gourd (Lagenaria siceraria) which date back to 2500 B.C. Other cultigens include squash (Cucurbita ficifolia, C. maxima, and C. moschata), chili pepper (Capiscum sp), the common bean (P. vulgaris), achira (Canne edulis) and jicama (Pachyrrhizus tuberosus). There are remnants of guava, lúcuma and pacay which insist on a varied diet as well as management over some crops that were not cultivated. An abundance of Solanum spp., found within coprolite remains indicates there were plants ranging from night shades to potatoes most likely being domesticated as well. Cotton is one of the highest found crops at the site. It was important as an industrial crop to build nets and lines for catching fish and other marine resources. It also doubled as a resource manufactured into textiles to make clothing.

== See also ==
- Nohmul, Belizean pyramid destroyed in 2013
