= El Porvenir =

El Porvenir or Porvenir (Spanish: "The Future") may refer to:

== Places ==
- Porvenir Municipality, Bolivia
- Porvenir, Pando, Bolivia
- Porvenir, Chile
- Porvenir Volcano, Costa Rica
- Porvenir, Texas, United States
- El Porvenir Parish, Palanda Canton, Zamora-Chinchipe, Ecuador
- El Porvenir, Santa Ana, El Salvador
- El Porvenir (Maya site), a Maya civilization archaeological site in Petén Department, Guatemala
- El Porvenir, Atlántida, Honduras
- El Porvenir, Francisco Morazán, Honduras
- El Porvenir, Chiapas, Mexico
- El Porvenir, Chihuahua, Mexico
- El Porvenir, New Mexico, United States
- El Porvenir, Chiriquí, Panama
- El Porvenir, Guna Yala, Panama
- Porvenir (Norte Chico site), a Norte Chico civilization archaeological site in Peru
- El Porvenir District, San Martín, Peru
- El Porvenir District, Trujillo, Peru
- El Porvenir, Seville, Spain
- Porvenir, Uruguay

== Other uses ==
- Club El Porvenir, a football club based in Gerli, Greater Buenos Aires, Argentina
- Club Porvenir Guaireño, a Paraguayan social club
- Porvenir Miraflores, a football club based in Miraflores, Lima, Peru
- El Porvenir (newspaper), Monterrey, Mexico
- El Porvenir (film), a short documentary film directed by Alfredo Alcántara and Josh Chertoff

== See also ==
- Porvenir Massacre, a September 2008 ambush in Bolivia
- Villa Porvenir, Canelones Department, Uruguay
- Porvenir Massacre (1918), the killing of fifteen men by Texas Rangers in 1918
