= Peñico =

Ancient city in Peru

- Location within Peru
- 10.9318°S 77.4307°W
- Cultures: Caral civilization
- Location: Peru
- Region: Huaura

History
- Built: 1800–1500 BC

Site notes
- Archaeologists: Ruth Shady
- Discovered: 2017

Peñico was an ancient Caral city located in the Peruvian province of Huaura in the northern Lima Region. The city is thought to have been founded between 1800 and 1500 BC. The Peruvian Ministry of Culture announced opening the site to the public in July 2025 following eight years of research and restorations. Numerous ancient towns found in the Supe and adjacent valleys are readily apparent and visible in satellite imagery, only a few have developed visitation facilities.

== History ==
The city is believed to have been founded sometime between the 16th century BC and the 19th century BC, near the end of the Caral–Supe civilization. It is thought that the city was a key trading hub for the civilization as it is in a strategic location for societes to exchange between the Andes, the Amazon and the Pacific coast. Archaeologist Ruth Shady led the research into Peñico after leading the excavation of Caral, a nearby city considered the center of the same civilization. Researchers have described the city's discovery as integral to understanding what happened to the civilization after its collapse, which has been attributed to climate change.

Over eight years of research, a total of 18 structures were unearthed at the site, including ceremonial temples and residential complexes, as well as the walls of a central plaza. Upon the announcement of the city opening to the public on 3 July 2025, archaeologists also announced findings of artifacts inside these buildings: ceremonial objects; clay sculptures of animal and human figures; and necklaces made from beads and seashells. Inside one structure, which was named B1-B3, archaeologists found ceremonial tools, clay sculptures and pututus (trumpets made from the shells of the Eastern Pacific giant conch). Researchers theorised that the city's prominence may have been attributable to the trade of hematite.
