= Chillón River =

River in Peru

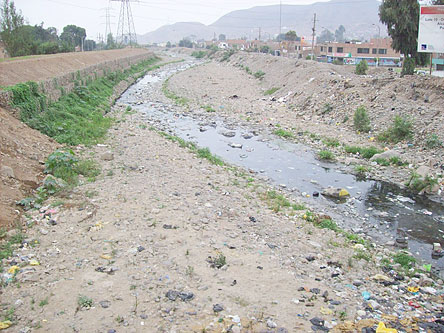
- Chillón River in the northern part of Lima

- Location of mouth
- Native name: Río Chillón (Spanish)

Location
- Country: Peru

Physical characteristics
- Mouth: Pacific Ocean
  - coordinates: 11°56′24″S 77°08′19″W

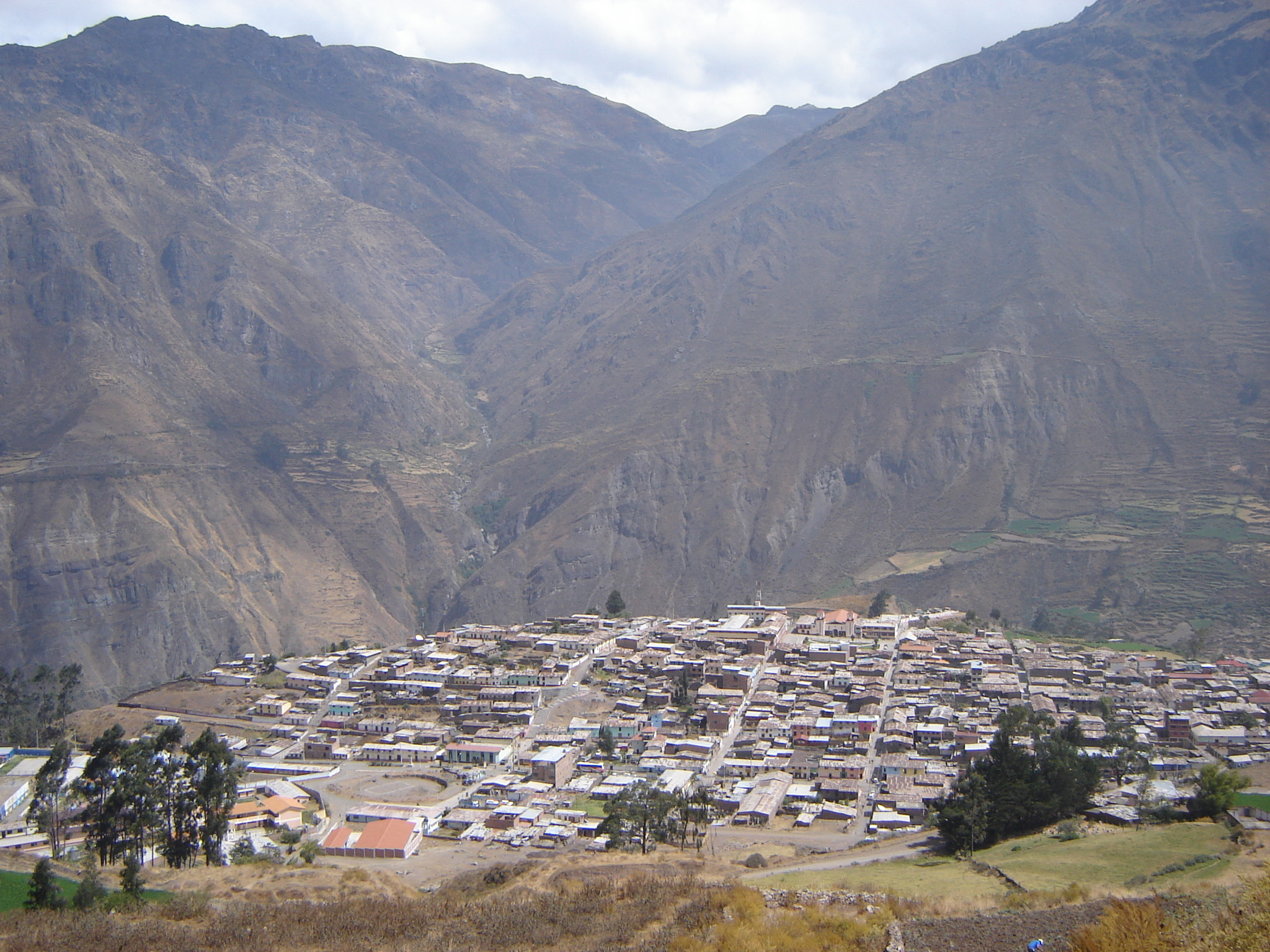
The town of Canta at the southern bank of the Chillón River

The Chillón River is a river located in western Peru. It originates in the glaciers of the Andes, and its mouth is located in the Pacific Ocean coast of the Callao Region. Its volume gets higher during the summer months (December to March). The river's valley is very fertile. It has been inhabited by varying indigenous cultures (including the Chancay culture) for more than ten thousand years, as shown by archaeological evidence.

The Pan-American Highway follows the valley to the north of Lima, Peru's capital city.

The 4,000-year-old ruins known as El Paraíso are located 40 kilometres north-east of Lima in the Chillón River Valley. A temple at the site is believed to be about 5,000 years old; if the date is confirmed it would be among the oldest sites in the world, comparable to the ancient city of Caral, a coastal city 200 kilometres to the north.
