= Huaricanga =

Archaeological site in Peru

Coordinates: 10°29′S 77°46′W

Huaricanga is the earliest city of the Norte Chico civilization, called Caral or Caral-Supe in Peru and Spanish language sources. Established around 3500 BC, Huaricanga was the oldest city in the Americas. This Late Archaic site is located in the arid Fortaleza Valley on Peru’s north central coast. It is 14 mi (23 km) inland from the Pacific Ocean. The site covers a total area of 100 hectares, and is the largest Late Archaic construction in the Norte Chico region.

The three earthwork mounds on the large site are believed to be remains of pyramidal-shaped structures. Two standing stones, known as huancas, also survive. Excavation in 2007 revealed a structure believed to be a temple, of a design similar to, but predating, the Mito architectural tradition seen in the Peruvian highlands.

In addition, later research in the Fortaleza and Pativilca valleys has found evidence of maize cultivation, as well as fourteen other domesticated species of fruits and vegetables. This suggests that agriculture may have been more important to the development of Caral-Supe civilization than previously thought, as it was for other independent civilizations of the world, such as Mesopotamia, Egypt, China, and India.

== History of Norte Chico or Caral-Supe ==
Approximately 5000 years ago, the Norte Chico region gave rise to the first civilization in the Americas, also known as Caral-Supe or Caral. Ruth Shady, a Peruvian archeologist, first identified this as an independent civilization and has been writing about it since 1994. North American researchers have also joined in conducting archeological excavations, investigating the region, and publicizing the work in English-language sources. It has altered the understanding of Andean highlands history.

This region on Peru’s north central Pacific coast is approximately 100 miles north of the modern city of Lima. It contains four river valleys: Fortaleza, Pativilca River, Supe River, and Huaura River. Archaeological surveys have uncovered 30 Late Archaic sites, ranging from 10 to 200 hectares in area. These sites are characterized by large, pyramid-like structures, sunken ceremonial plazas, and other assorted temples and housing.

== Description ==
Today the Pativilca-Huaraz highway divides the site. Near the river, the current site consists of the remains of two mounds, the larger of which measures roughly 220 m (720 ft) in length. Near this larger mound were two standing stones, known as huancas, which are believed to hold some sacred ceremonial purpose. Huaricanga is believed to have served as a religious center. Residents persuaded fishermen and inhabitants of the nearby highlands to participate in seasonal rituals.

Additionally, a third, U-shaped mound is located here above the river floodplain. It is known as El Castillo de Huaricanga. Judging from dating the ceramics found at the site, it was from the Initial Period (1800–900 BC). During this time and during the Early Horizon Period (900–200 BC), El Castillo de Huaricanga served as a stop for travelers on their way to the major religious site of Chavin de Huantar.

The land in and around Huaricanga consists mainly of rock and dirt, with very few trees. The climate is generally dry. The ancient people of Huaricanga were completely dependent on irrigation for crop cultivation. Some experts theorize that an increased frequency of the weather phenomenon El Niño worsened fishing conditions, driving people inland towards sites such as Huaricanga.

The site of Huaricanga was excavated in 2003 and 2007 by PANC (Proyecto Arqueológico Norte Chico). The 2007 excavation uncovered evidence of a structure that consisted of a two-level floor, a surrounding bench, a central fire pit, and walls with niches. This indicates that the temple was constructed in the Mito architectural tradition, which is also seen in the Peruvian highlands. But radiocarbon dating has confirmed that the structure was constructed around 2560 BC, prior to the earliest known examples of the Mito tradition. A range of samples was tested, including mixed plant fibers, bag fibers, and charcoal.

== Role of agriculture ==
The reasons why so many South American ancient civilizations emerged in Peru in the Late Archaic period has long been a topic of debate. Many historians believed that the nearby marine resources were the catalyst to the rapid cultural development in the Andean region of Peru, which is different from the reliance of most original civilizations on cultivation of agriculture and production of surpluses. The minimal macroscopic evidence of corn at this site led researchers to believe that it was used simply for ceremonial purposes.

But, between 2002 and 2008, researchers have conducted exploratory excavations in the valleys of Pativilca and Fortaleza, and reported on it in 2013. They particularly investigated the sites of Caballete and Huaricanga.

Researchers looked at microscopic evidence found in prehistoric soil samples, stone tools, and coprolites (fossilized fecal matter). They found an abundance of Zea mays pollen, which is congruent with evidence found in Mesopotamia, Egypt, India, and China—other ancient civilizations that arose based on development of agriculture. Also, a large majority of stone tools tested showed evidence of corn starch grains or corn phytoliths, which are plant silica bodies. Finally, most of the coprolites tested contained corn starch grains or corn phytoliths, plus evidence of sweet potatoes and anchovies. All of this evidence suggests that agriculture supported the development of civilization in Huaricanga and the entire Andean region. Recent research indicates the presence of 14 other domesticated plant species, both fruits and vegetables. Researchers believe that these botanical species were used for religious rituals, healing rituals, and construction materials, in addition to consumption in diet.

== Present work ==
Archaeological excavations are being carried out at the Huaricanga site as part of the Huaricanga Archaeological Research Project (HARP). These efforts are being co-directed by Matthew Piscitelli and Carmela Alarcon, in association with the Field Museum in Chicago, Illinois, USA.
