= Aspero =

Archaeological site in Peru

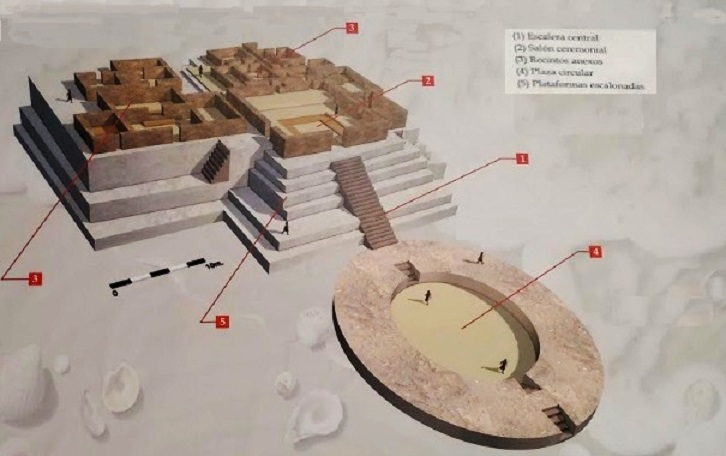
- 3D reconstruction of one of the temples of Aspero

- Location in Peru
- 10.8156°S 77.741°W
- Type: Settlement
- Periods: Pre-ceramic
- Cultures: Norte Chico civilization
- Location: Lima, Peru

History
- Built: c. 3700 BC
- Abandoned: c. 1800 BC

Aspero is a well-studied Late Preceramic site archaeological complex located near the mouth of the Supe River, south of Supe Puerto, on the central coast of Peru. It forms part of the ancient Caral-Supe civilization and was occupied during the Late Archaic period, from around 3700 BC to around 1800 BC. It is connected culturally to the ancient city of Caral, located 25 km up-valley, for which it presumably served as a major fishery. The site covers an area of approximately 14 hectares (35 acres) and features numerous temples or huacas, of which the most prominent are the Huaca Alta, the Huaca de los ídolos and the Huaca de los Sacrificios. Remains of human sacrifice have been found in the latter, dated to about 4,500 years ago.

== Location ==
Aspero is located on the right bank of the Supe River, 2 km south of the port of the same name, around 500 meters from the Pacific Ocean, in the midst of sandy hills, wetlands and cultivated fields. It belongs to the jurisdiction of the district of Supe Puerto in the province of Barranca in the department of Lima. To access the site, visitors have to walk 2 km southwest from the Plazuela Grau, along the Pérez de Cuellar housing estate.

== Excavations ==
After excavations archaeologists have found that each mound was built in stages, having two or three tiers rising around 10 meters above the surface. They have found ceremonial buildings, plazas, terraces, and large middens. Caches were found in these structures including clay figurines, wooden bowls, feathers, cotton, and string and cane objects. The diet of Aspero is believed to have been primarily maritime because of its proximity to the Pacific Ocean. Fish hooks and nets have also been found in trash middens and domestic contexts to support this idea. Research at the site led to the controversial "Maritime Foundations of Andean culture" theory, which suggests that the initial development of ancient Peruvian culture was based on fishing, shellfish collecting, and hunting sea mammals, rather than agriculture. The idea is widely disputed by other scholars who claim there is evidence of earlier, inland sites where irrigation agriculture was widespread.

New technology has led to the discoveries that changed our views of Aspero. Carbon dating has given a more exact date, while also connecting Aspero to other more agriculturally based inland sites. Carbon dating of the communal structures of the local sites surrounding the Supe Valley places Aspero within 3700~2500 cal. B.C. or the middle to late Archaic Period.

These connections have led archaeologists to believe that Aspero wasn't mainly a maritime culture, but an agriculture-based community with more local maritime traits. In other words, Aspero exploited the trade and knowledge of agriculture from the inland sites, such as Caral and Lurihuasi. This does not completely disprove the maritime theory because Aspero was taking advantage of its proximity to the Pacific Ocean for maritime resources. These new dates not only provide an insight into how Aspero developed, but also show the cultural connection that Aspero had with its neighboring sites. Researchers have established a general timeline which links Aspero and its adjacent sites to a much larger cultural system that spread across several valleys.

== See also ==
- Andean preceramic
- Huaricanga

== Bibliography ==
- Giesso, Martin, 2008, Historical Dictionary of Ancient South America, The Scarecrow Press Inc. Lanham, Maryland, Toronto and Plymouth, UK.
- Isbell William, H. and Helaine Silverman, 2006, Andean Archaeology III: North and South, Springer.
- Moseley, Michael E., 2001, The Incas and their Ancestors. The Archaeology of Peru. Revised Edition. Thames & Hudson
- Pozoroski Shelia and Thomas Pozoroski, 2008, Early Cultural Complexity on the Coast of Peru, in The Handbook of American Archaeology, edited by Helaine Silverman and William H. Isbell, Springer, pp: 603–631.
- Sandweiss, D. H.; Solis, R. S.; Moseley, M. E.; Keefer, D. K.; Ortloff, C. R. (2009). "Environmental change and economic development in coastal Peru between 5,800 and 3,600 years ago". Proceedings of the National Academy of Sciences. 106 (5): 1359–63. Bibcode:2009PNAS..106.1359S. doi:10.1073/pnas.0812645106. PMC 2635784. PMID 19164564.
- Stanish, Charles, 2001, The Origin of State Societies in South America. Annual Review of Anthropology, Vol. 30, pp. 41–64.
