= El porvenir (film) =

- Promotional poster
- Directed by: Alfredo Alcántara; Josh Chertoff
- Produced by: Ben Alcantara
- Starring: Abelardo Olguín Cuevas
- Cinematography: Alfredo Alcántara
- Edited by: Josh Chertoff
- Music by: Kelly Pratt
- Release date: 2015
- Running time: 14 minutes
- Country: United States
- Language: Spanish

El porvenir is a 2015 short documentary film directed by Alfredo Alcántara and Josh Chertoff. The premiere was aired at the 2015 South by Southwest (SXSW) Film Festival. El porvenir is an inside look at the world of Mexican cockfighting, where men and roosters meet at the intersection of life, death, and sport.

== Plot ==
This short documentary follows Abelardo Olguín Cuevas, a third-generation Mexican cockfighter struggling to hold on to his family's traditions in the face of a growing movement to ban the sport across the country. Cockfighting has been Abelardo's passion since he was five years old. Now, with children of his own, he hopes to pass on tradition, but he and his fellow cockfighters see the world changing before their eyes.

The film explores Abelardo's day-to-day life in Ixmiquilpan, Central Mexico, from his farm, where he trains his roosters, to the cockfighting tournaments. A unique glimpse into the vibrant and controversial culture of cockfighting.

== About the film ==
The director's goal in dealing with this controversial subject was to remain as objective as possible and not pass any judgment. The film does not aim at answering any moral or ethical questions but rather explore the world of the passionate Mexican cockfighter.
