= Ruth Shady =

Peruvian anthropologist and archaeologist (born 1946)

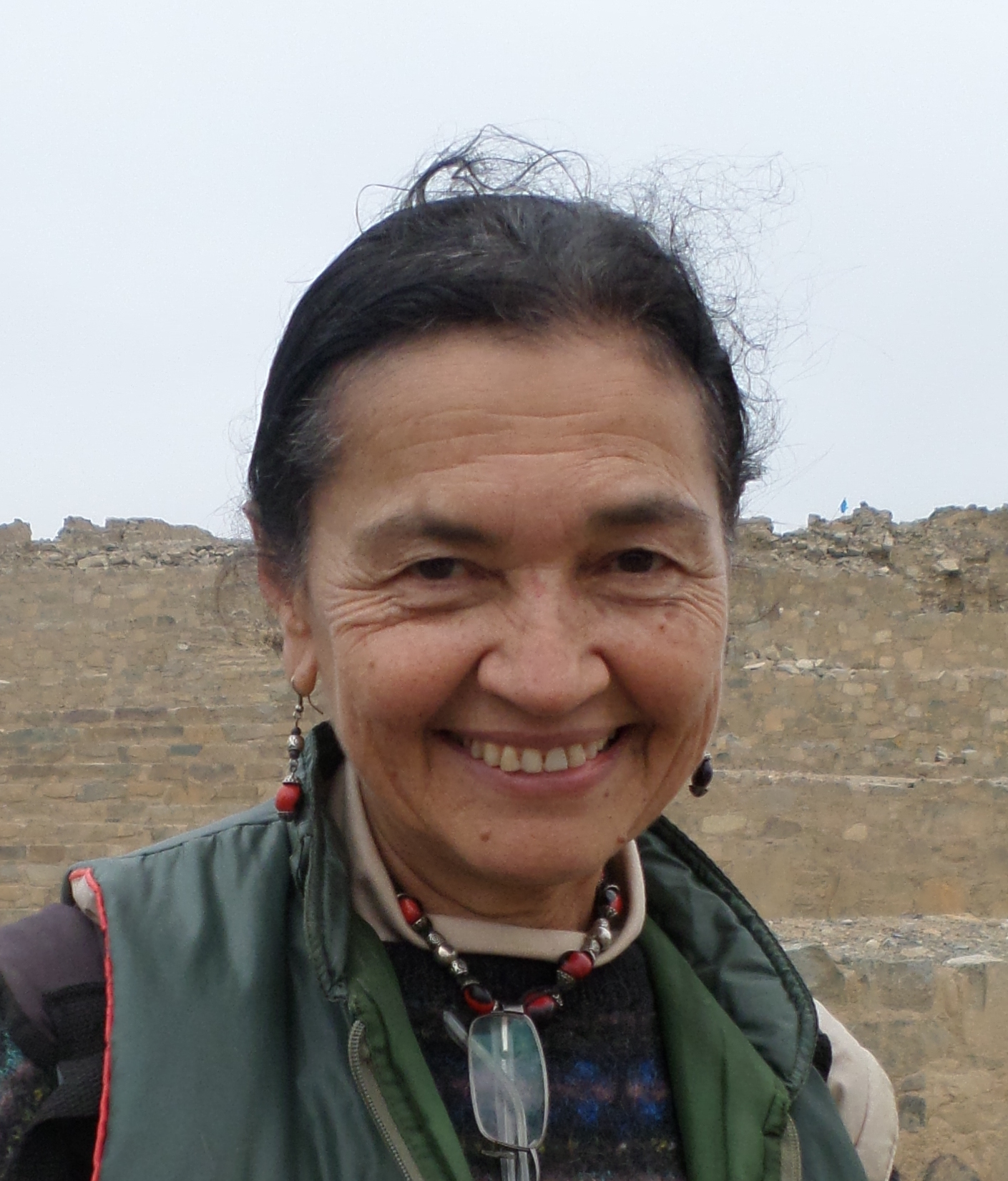
- Shady in 2014
- Born: Ruth Martha Shady Solís; 29 December 1946 (age 79); Callao, Peru
- Occupations: Anthropologist and archaeologist
- Known for: First extensive documentation of the Norte Chico civilization
- Awards: BBC's 100 Women 2020

Ruth Martha Shady Solís (born 29 December 1946) is a Peruvian anthropologist and archaeologist. She is the founder and director of the archaeological project at Caral.

== Career ==
Throughout her career, she has directed many different projects of archeological investigation on the coast, the highlands and the rain forests of Peru, placing emphasis on the study of the development of the complex socio-political organizations. She was director of the Museo Nacional de Arqueología y Antropología del Perú (National Museum of Archaeology and Anthropology of Peru), and director of the Museum of Archeology and Anthropology of National University of San Marcos. She has worked at the Caral site from 1994 onwards and is credited with the discovery of Norte Chico, the first known civilization of the Americas, and one of the oldest in the world. Shady has named the civilization after Caral, while the term Norte Chico has been adopted in English.

In 2001, Shady and others published radiocarbon dates from the site of Caral in the Supe Valley of Peru, indicating that monumental corporate architecture, urban settlement, and irrigation agriculture began in the Americas by 4090 years before the present (2627 calibrated years B.C.) to 3640 years before the present (1977 calibrated years B.C.). Caral is located 23 kilometers (14 miles) inland from the Pacific coast and contains a central zone of monumental, residential, and nonresidential architecture covering an area of 65 hectares (160 acres). Caral is one of 18 large preceramic sites in the Supe Valley.

Shady holds the offices of President of ICOMOS-PERU, principal professor and co-ordinator of the master of archeology graduate program faculty of social sciences of the University of San Marcos and director of the special archeological project Caral-Supe/INC.

== Awards ==
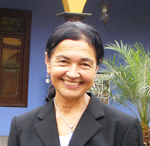
Ruth Shady after an archaeology conference at University of San Marcos in Lima, Peru.

- In 2007, Shady won the Esteban Campodónico Prize in the area of outstanding professional activity in service to Peruvian society.
- Shady won the 2018 L'Oreal-UNESCO Peru National Prize for Women in Science.
- Shady was on the list of the BBC's 100 Women announced on 23 November 2020.
- In 2021, the president of the Republic of Peru bestowed on Shady the Order of Merit for Distinguished Services, in the Grand Cross degree.
