= Culture of Asia =

Map of Asia

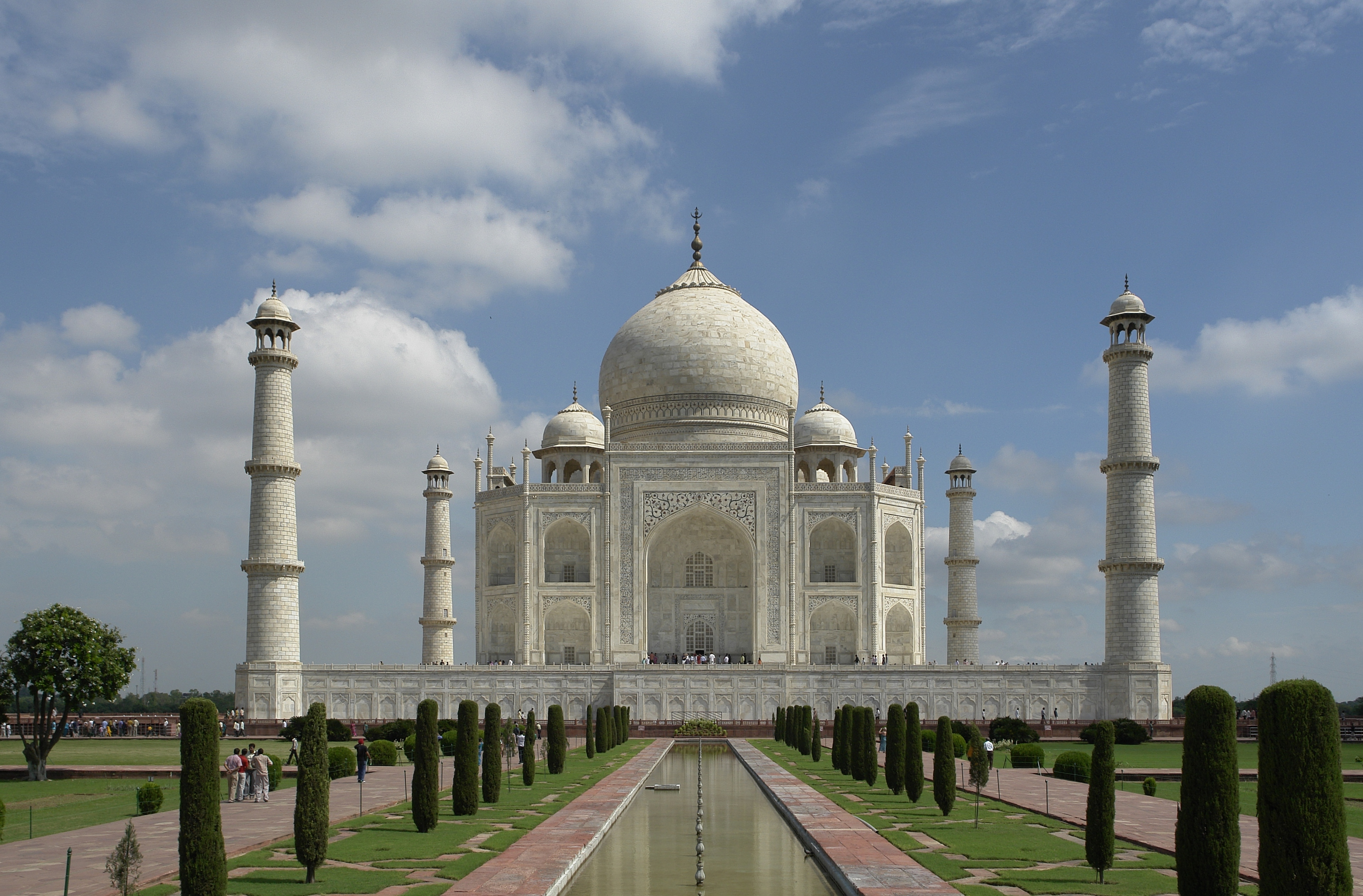
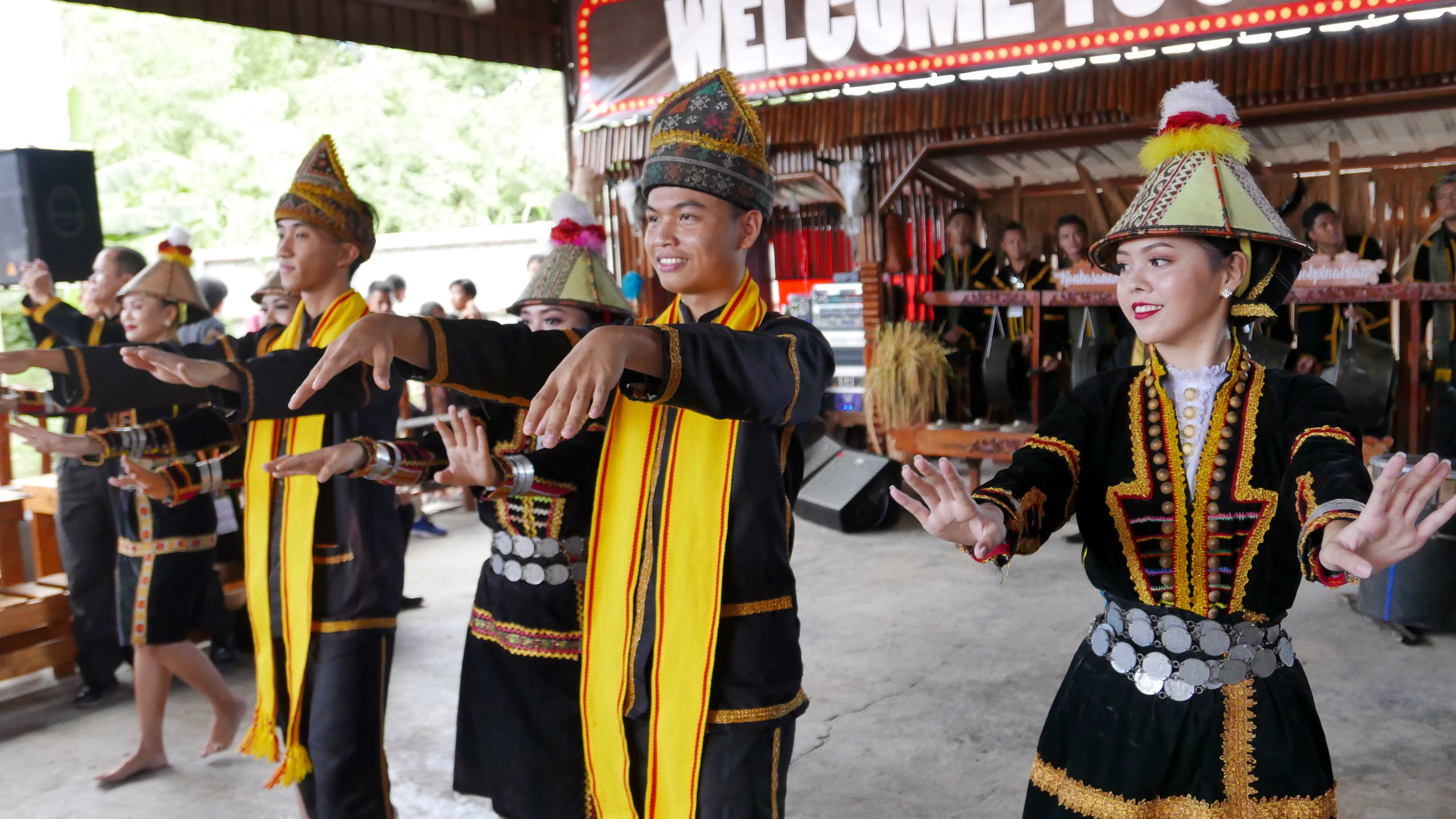
The Taj Mahal in Agra, India (left), Malaysian dancers in traditional clothing (right).

The culture of Asia encompasses the collective and diverse customs and traditions of art, architecture, music, literature, lifestyle, philosophy, food, politics and religion that have been practiced and maintained by the numerous ethnic groups of the continent of Asia since prehistory. Identification of a specific culture of Asia or universal elements among the colossal diversity that has emanated from multiple cultural spheres and three of the four ancient River valley civilizations is complicated. However, the continent is commonly divided into six geographic sub-regions, that are characterized by perceivable commonalities, like culture, religion, language and relative ethnic homogeneity. These regions are Central Asia, East Asia, North Asia, South Asia, Southeast Asia and West Asia.

As the largest, most populous continent and rich in resources, Asia is home to several of the world's oldest civilizations, that produced the majority of the great religious systems, the oldest known recorded myths and codices on ethics and morality.

Asia's enormous size separates the various civilizations by large distances and hostile environments, such as deserts and mountain ranges. By challenging and overcoming these distances, trade and commerce gradually developed a Pan-Asian character. Inter-regional trade was the driving and cohesive force, by which cultural elements and ideas spread to the various sub-regions, via the vast road network and the many sea routes.

== Multiple cultural regions ==
Asia's various modern cultural and religious spheres correspond roughly with the principal centers of civilization.

West Asia (or Southwest Asia as Ian Morrison puts it, or sometimes referred to as the Middle East) has their cultural roots in the pioneering civilizations of the Fertile Crescent and Mesopotamia, spawning the Persian, Arab, Ottoman empires, as well as the Abrahamic religions of Judaism and later Islam. According to Morrison, in his book Why the West Rules--For Now, these original civilizations of the Hilly Flanks are so far (by archaeological evidence) the oldest (first evidence of farming c. 9000 BC). The Hilly Flanks is also the birthplace of his definition of the west (which groups the Middle East with Europe). According to his definition this would make Asia the origin of western culture. Not everybody agrees with him though.

India, South Asia, and the Indosphere emanate from the Indus Valley Civilization.

The East Asian cultural sphere developed from the Yellow River civilization. Southeast Asia's migration waves of more varied ethnic groups are relatively recent. Commercial interaction with South Asia eventually lead to the adoption of culture from India and China (including Hinduism, Buddhism, Confucianism, Daoism). The region later absorbed influences from Islam as well, and the Malays are currently the largest Islamic population in the world. North Asia's (otherwise known as Siberia) harsh climate and unfavorable soil proved to be unsuited to permanently support large urban settlements and only permits the presence of a pastoral and nomadic population, spread over large areas. Nonetheless, North Asian religious and spiritual traditions eventually diffused into more comprehensive systems such as Tibetan Buddhism that developed its own unique characteristics (e.g. Mongolian Buddhism). For these reasons it is becoming more unconventional to separate it from the rest of East Asian cultures.

Central Asia has also absorbed influences from both West Asia and East Asia (including Persia and Mongolia), making it another melting pot of cultures.

The cultural spheres are not mutually disjoint and can even overlap, representing the innate diversity and syncretism of human cultures and historical influences.

=== East Asia ===
East Asian cultural sphere

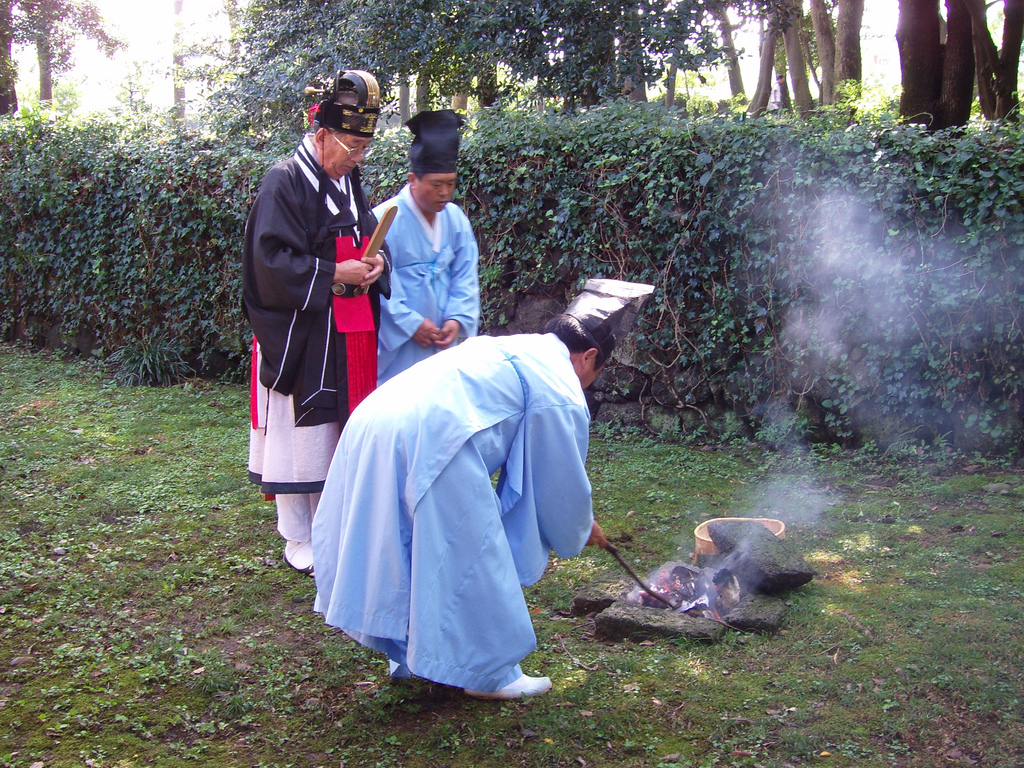
A Confucian ritual ceremony in Jeju, South Korea

The term East Asian cultural sphere defines the common cultural sphere of China, Japan, North Korea, South Korea in East Asia and Vietnam in Southeast Asia. Ethnic and linguistic similarities, shared artistic traditions, written language and moral values suggest that most East Asian people are descendants of the Yellow River civilization, that emerged in the flood plains of northern China around 10.000 years B.P.

Historically, China occupied the prominent, central role in East Asia for a long time in recorded history, as it "deeply influenced the culture of the peripheral countries and also drew them into a "China-centered" [...] international order", that was briefly interrupted by the 20th century. Nations within its orbit from Central Asia to Southeast Asia paid to the Chinese tributary system (see List of tributaries of China). The Imperial Chinese tributary system is based on the Confucian religious and philosophical idea of submission to celestial harmony was also recognized by nations beyond, in Southeast Asia in particular. Ceremonies were presided over by the Emperor of China as the Son of Heaven and curator of the Mandate of Heaven. In elaborate ceremonies both, the tributary state and the various Chinese dynasties agreed to mutually favorable economic co-operation and beneficial security policies.

Some of defining East Asian cultural characteristics are the Chinese language and traditional writings systems of Hanzi as well as shared religious and ethical ideas, that are represented by the Three teachings: Buddhism, Taoism and Confucianism. The Chinese script is one of the oldest continuously used writing systems in the world, and has been a major unifying force and medium for conveying Chinese culture in East Asia. Classical Chinese was the literary language of elites and bureaucrats. Historically used throughout the region, it is still in use by Chinese diaspora communities around the world, as well as in Japan, Korea, Vietnam, and pockets of Southeast Asia.

However, as Chinese writing concepts were passed on to Korea, Japan and Vietnam, these nations developed their own characteristic writing systems to complement Hanzi. Vietnam invented their own Chữ Nôm glyphs, Japan invented Kana, and Korea invented their own alphabet Hangul. To this day, Vietnam mostly writes in Chữ Quốc ngữ (a modified Latin alphabet) but there is also a resurgence of Hán-Nôm (a type of writing that combines both Chữ Hán and Chữ Nôm) as well. Sino cognates compose a vast majority of the vocabulary of these languages (see Sino-Vietnamese vocabulary, Sino-Korean vocabulary, Sino-Japanese vocabulary). In the 20th century, China has also re-borrowed terms from Japan to represent western concepts known as Wasei-kango.

Apart from the unifying influence of Confucianism and Taoism, Chinese characters and numerous other Chinese cultural influences, East Asian national customs, architecture, literature, cuisines, traditional music, performing arts and crafts also have developed from many independent and local concepts, they have grown and diversified as many rank among the most refined expressions of aesthetic, artistic and philosophical ideas in the world. Notable among others are Japanese gardens and landscape planning, Heian literature, Vietnamese Water puppetry and the artifacts of the Đông Sơn culture. Modern research has also focused on the several nations pivotal role on the collective body of East Asian Buddhism and the Korean influence on Japanese culture as well as Japanese influence on Korean culture.

=== Southeast Asia ===
Southeast Asia divides into Mainland Southeast Asia, that encompasses Vietnam, Laos, Cambodia, Thailand, Myanmar and West Malaysia, and Maritime Southeast Asia, that includes Indonesia, East Malaysia, Singapore, the Philippines, East Timor, Brunei, Cocos (Keeling) Islands, and Christmas Island. At the crossroads of the Indian and East Asian maritime trade routes since around 500 B.C., the region has been greatly influenced by the culture of India and China. Most of the influence of India came in the era of the Chola dynasty spreading Tamil and Hindu cultures across present Southeast Asian countries and even expanding and establishing Hindu kingdoms in the region. The term Indianised Kingdoms is a designation for numerous Southeast Asian political units, that had to a varying degree adopted most aspects of India's statecraft, administration, art, epigraphy, writing and architecture. The religions Hinduism, Buddhism, and Islam gradually diffused into local cosmology. Nonetheless, the Southeast Asian nations have very diversely adapted to these cultural stimuli and evolved their distinct sophisticated expression in lifestyle, the visual arts and most notably in architectural accomplishments, such as Angkor Wat in Cambodia and Borobudur in Indonesia.

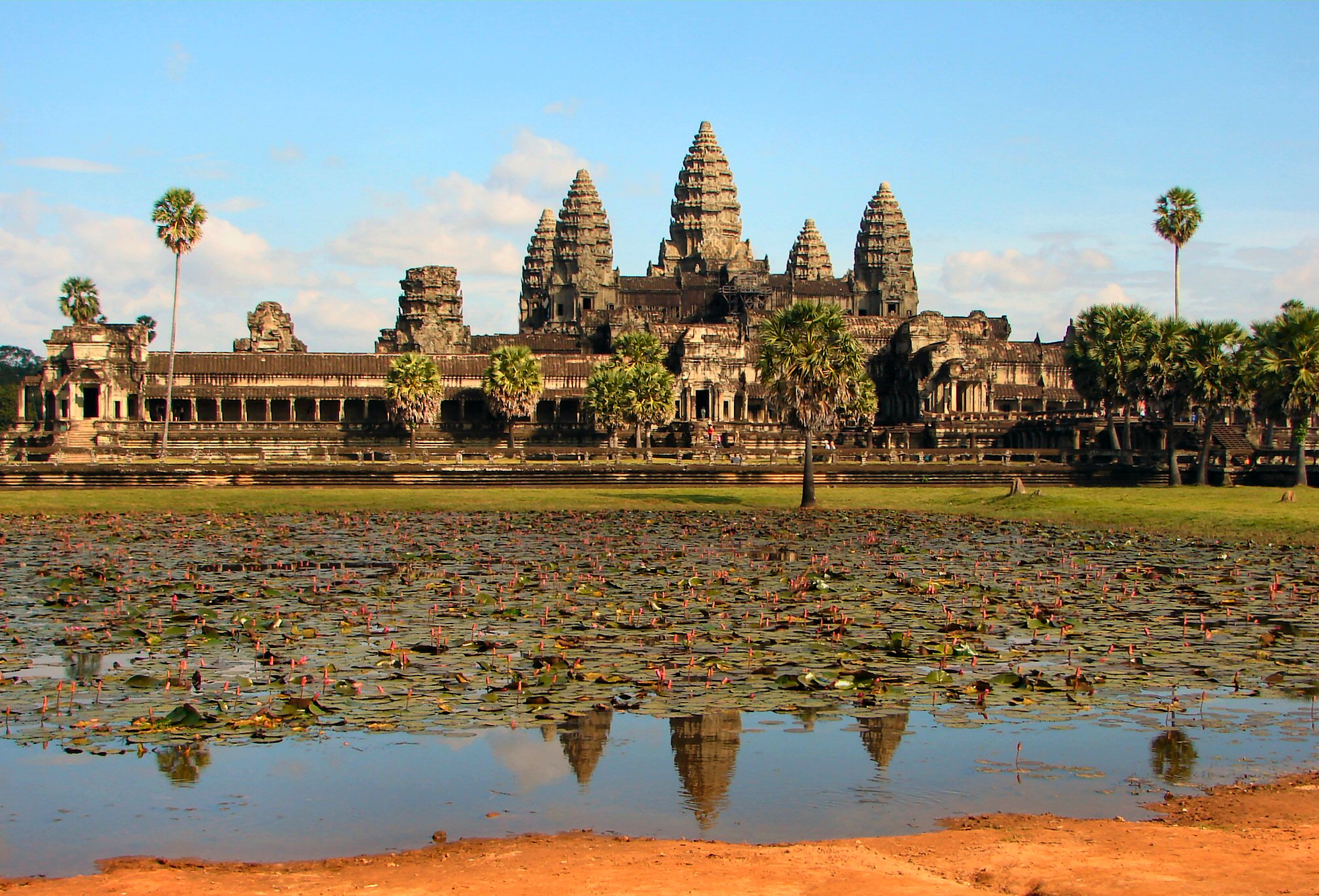
Angkor Wat, Khmer Empire

Buddhist culture has a lasting and significant impact in mainland Southeast Asia; most Buddhists in Indochina practice Theravada Buddhism. In the case of Vietnam, it is also influenced much by Confucianism and the culture of China. Myanmar has also been exposed to Indian cultural influences. Before the 14th century, Hinduism and Buddhism were the dominant religions of Southeast Asia. Thereafter, Islam became dominant in Indonesia, Malaysia and Brunei. Southeast Asia has also had a lot of Western influence due to the lasting legacy of colonialism. One example is the Philippines which has been heavily influenced by the United States and Spain, with Christianity (Catholicism) as the dominant religion. East Timor also demonstrates Portuguese influence through colonialism, as is also a predominantly Christian nation.

A common feature found around the region are stilt houses. These houses are elevated on stilts so that water can easily pass below them in case of a flood. Another shared feature is rice paddy agriculture, which originated in Southeast Asia thousands of years ago. Dance drama is also a very important feature of the culture, utilizing movements of the hands and feet perfected over thousands of years. Furthermore, the arts and literature of Southeast Asia is very distinctive as some have been influenced by Indian, Chinese, Buddhist, and Islamic literature.

=== South Asia ===
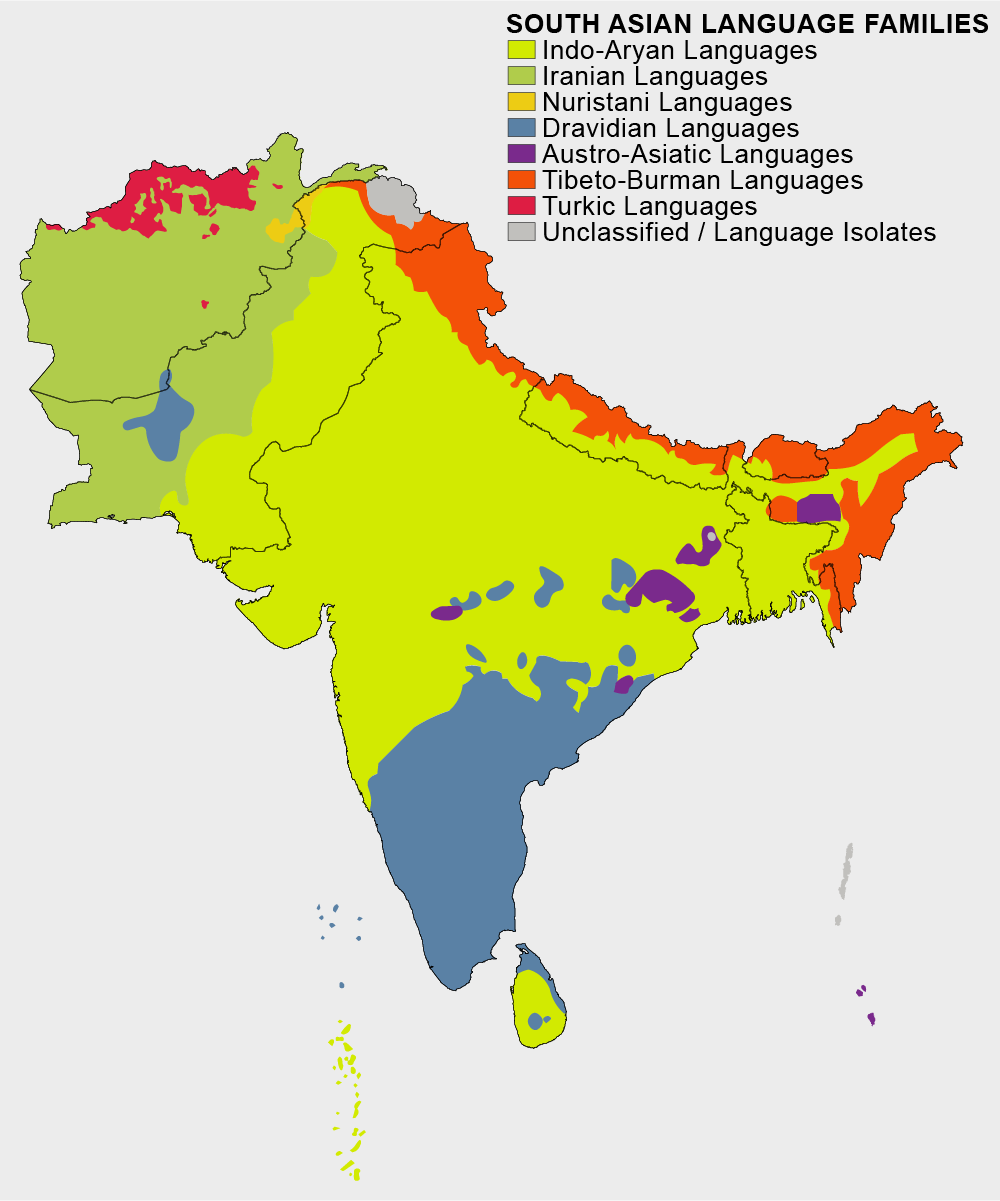
Language families in South Asia

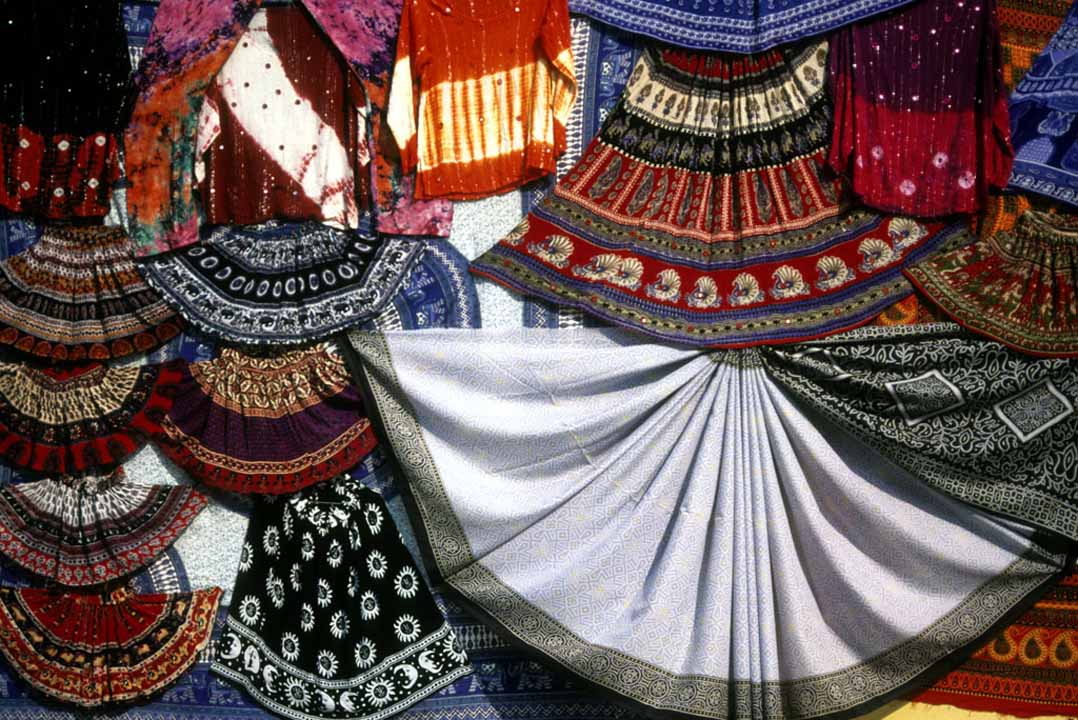
Traditional Rajasthani garments from Jaipur, Rajasthan

Evidence of Neolithic culture has been found throughout the modern countries of Afghanistan, Bangladesh, Bhutan, Maldives, Nepal, India, Pakistan and Sri Lanka that represent South Asia (sometimes known as the Indian subcontinent). In 3300 B.C., in northwestern South Asia, a sophisticated Bronze Age cultural tradition emerged that, after only a few centuries, fully flourished in urban centers. Due to the high quality of its arts, crafts, metallurgy and buildings, the accomplishments in urban planning, governance, trade and technology, it has been classified as one of the principal cradles of civilization. Referred to as the Indus Valley Civilisation or Harappan Civilisation it thrived for almost 2.000 years until the onset of the Vedic period (c. 1500 – c. 600 B.C.). The great significance of the Vedic texts (that don't mention cities or urban life) for South Asian culture, their impact on family, societal organisation, religion, morale, and literature has never been contested. The Indus Civilisation on the other hand has only come to light by means of 20th century archaeology. Scholars, who employ several periodization models argue over whether South Asian tradition is consciously committed to the Harappan culture.

Declining climatic conditions, (aridification) and population displacement (Indo-Aryan migration) are regarded as to have caused the fatal disruption of the Harappan culture, that was superseded by the rural Vedic culture.

Following the Indo-Aryan settlement in the Indo-Gangetic Plain and the establishment of the characteristic social groups (Brahmins, Kshatriyas, Vaishyas and Shudras) in the caste system based on the Jāti model in the Varna order, the tribal entities variously consolidated into oligarchic chiefdoms or kingdoms, the Mahajanapadas, beginning in the sixth century B.C. The late Vedic political progress results in urbanization, strict social hierarchy, commercial and military rivalries among the settlers, that have spread all over the entire subcontinent. The large body of Vedic texts and literature, supported by the archaeological sequence allows researchers to reconstruct a rather accurate and detailed image of the Vedic culture and political organisation. The Vedas constitute the oldest work of Sanskrit literature and form the basis of religious, ethic and philosophic ideas in South Asia. They are widely, but not exclusively regarded the basics and scriptural authority on worship, rituals, ceremonies, sacrifices, meditation, philosophy and spiritual knowledge for the future Hindu and Buddhist cosmology. Commentaries and discussions also focus on the development of valid political ideas and concepts of societal progress and ethic conformity.

Hinduism, Buddhism, Jainism and Sikhism are major religions of South Asia. After a long and complex history of cosmological and religious development, adoption and decline, the Hindu-synthesis and the late but thorough introduction of Islam about 80% of modern-day Indians and Nepalis identify as Hindus. In Sri Lanka and Bhutan most people adhere to various forms of Buddhism. Islam is the predominant religion in Afghanistan, the Maldives (99%), Pakistan (96%) and Bangladesh (90%).

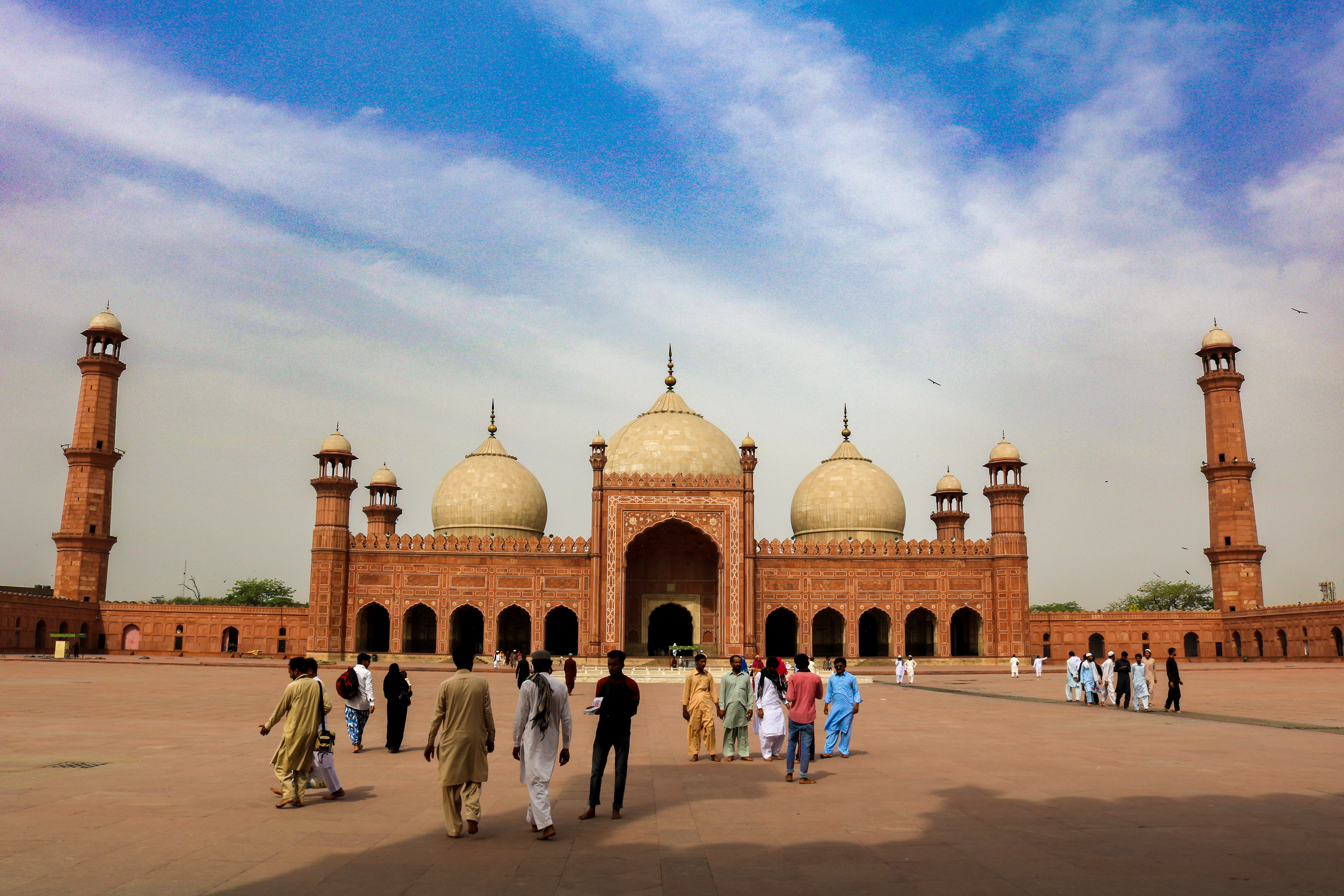
Badshahi Mosque built under the Mughal emperor Aurangzeb in Lahore, Pakistan

Afghanistan and Pakistan are situated at the western periphery of South Asia, where the cultural character has been made by both the Indosphere and Persosphere. Pakistan is split with its two western regions of Baluchistan and Khyber Pakhtunkhwa sharing a greater Iranic heritage due to the native Pashtuns and Baloch people of the regions. Its two eastern regions of Punjab and Sindh share cultural links to Northwest India. Bangladesh and the Indian state of West Bengal share a common heritage and culture based on the Bengali language. The culture of India is diverse and a complex mixture of many influences. Nepal is culturally linked to both India and Tibet and the varied ethnic groups of the country share many of the festivals and cultural traditions used and celebrated in North and East India and Tibet. Nepali, the dominant language of Nepal uses the Devanagari alphabet which is also used to write many North Indian languages. Bhutan is a culturally linked to Tibet and India. Tibetan Buddhism is the dominant religion in Bhutan and the Tibetan alphabet is used to write Dzongkha, the dominant language of Bhutan. There is a cultural and linguistic divide between North and South India. Sri Lanka is culturally tied to both India and Southeast Asia. Sinhala, the dominant language in the country is written in Sinhala script which is derived from the Kadamba-Pallava alphabet, certain cultural traditions, and aspects of its cuisine, for example, show South Indian influences. Cultural festivals, aspects of its cuisine and Theravada Buddhism, the dominant religion in Sri Lanka, show a Southeast Asian affinity.

Indo-Aryan languages are spoken in Pakistan, Bangladesh, the Maldives, Sinhala of Sri Lanka and most of North, West and East India and Nepal. Dravidian languages namely Telugu, Tamil, Kannada and Malayalam languages are spoken across South India and in Sri Lanka by the Tamil community while Brahui is spoken in Balochistan, Pakistan. Tibeto-Burman languages are spoken in Nepal, Bhutan, North Pakistan and North & Northeast India. Iranic Languages are spoken in Baluchistan and Khyber Pakhtunkhwa in Pakistan. The main languages of Afghanistan are Pashto and Dari.

=== Central Asia ===
Central Asia, in between the Caspian Sea and East Asia, envelops five former Soviet Socialist Republics: Kazakhstan, Kyrgyzstan, Tajikistan, Uzbekistan and Turkmenistan. However, Afghanistan is sometimes included. Its strategic and historic position around the east–west axis and the major trading routes such as the Silk Road has made it a theatre a steady exchange of ideas and east–west conflicts such as the Battle of Talas. The region was conquered and dominated by a variety of cultures, such as the Chinese, Greeks, Mongols, Persians, Tatars, Russians, and Sarmatians. As some Central Asian areas have been inhabited by nomadic people, numerous urban centers have developed in a distinct local character.

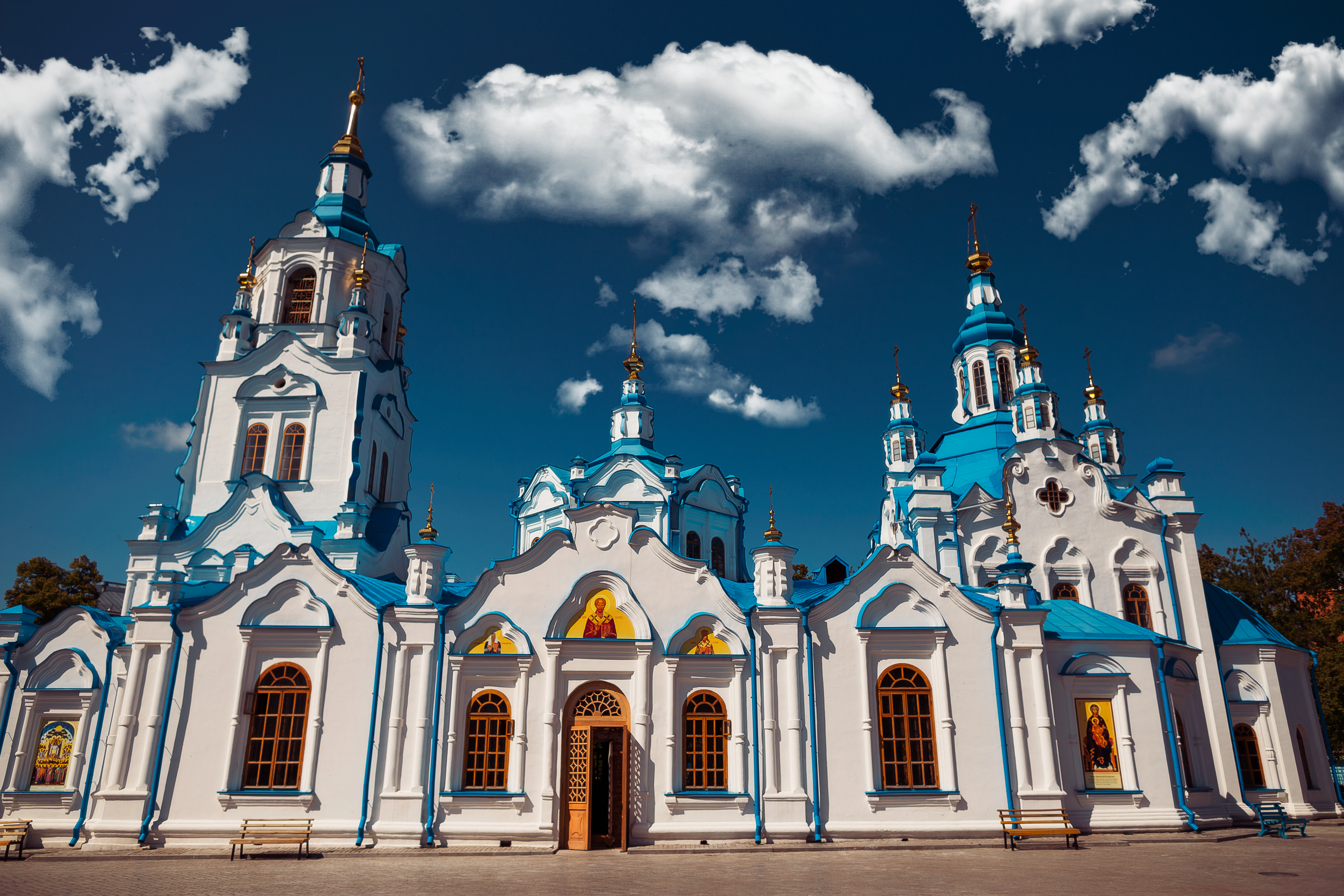
The Russian Znamensky Cathedral in Tyumen built in 1768

This region was mainly dominated by Russians in the Soviet era and even after its dissolution in 1991. Even now the region is dominated by them.

=== North Asia ===
For the most part, North Asia (more widely known as Siberia) is considered to be made up of the Asian part of Russia solely. The geographic region of Siberia was the historical land of the Tatars in the Siberia Khanate. However Russian expansion essentially undermined this and thus today it is under Russian rule. Other ethnic groups that inhabit Siberia include the Buryats, Evenks, and Yakuts. There are roughly 40 million people living in North Asia and the majority consists now of ethnic Russians. However, many East Asians also inhabit the region, and historically they have been the majority before Russia's expansion east.

=== West Asia ===
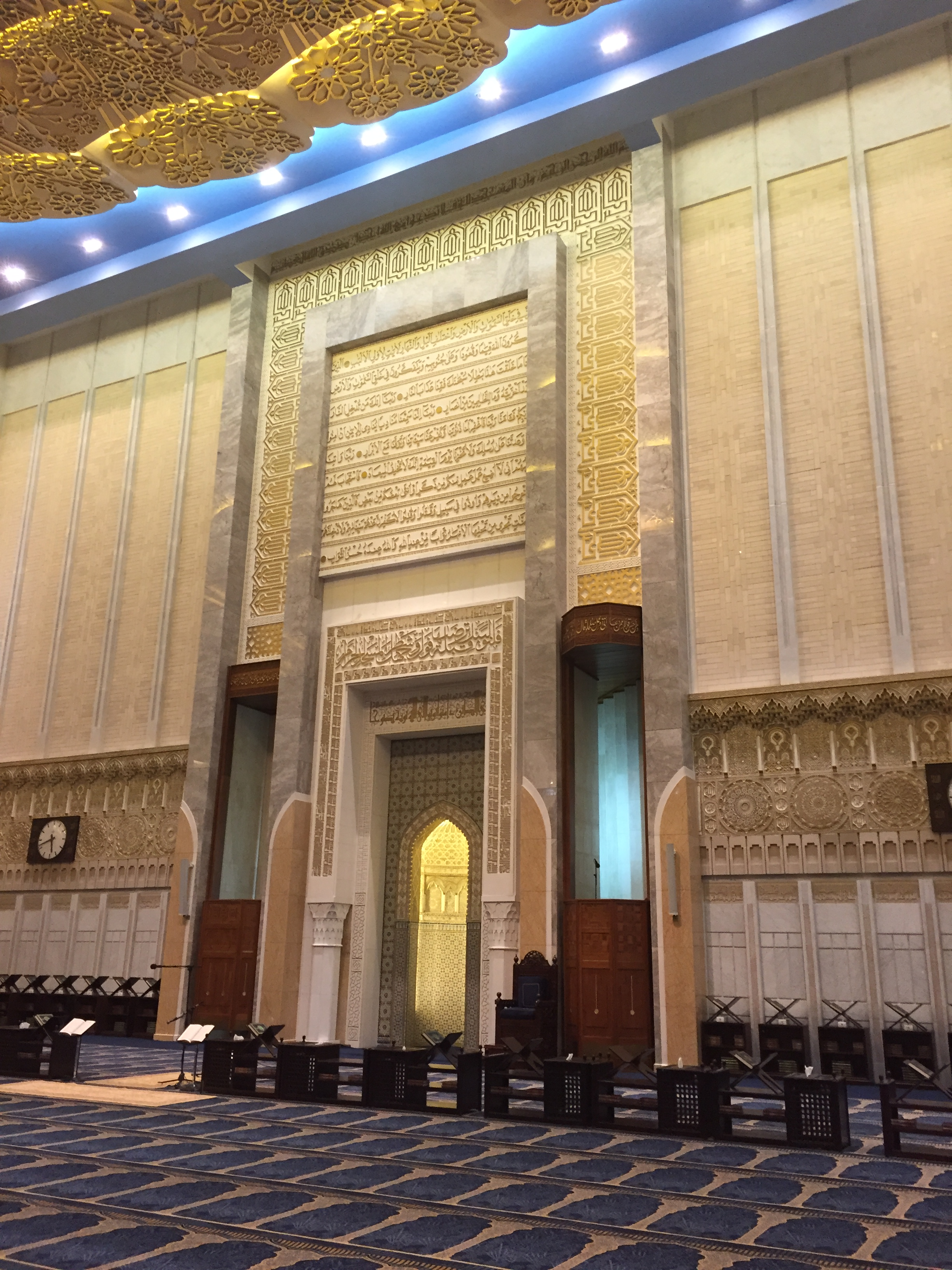
The Grand Mosque in Kuwait City, one of the largest mosques in the region

West Asia must be distinguished from the Middle East, a more recent Eurocentric term, that also includes parts of Northern Africa. West Asia consists of Turkey, Syria, Georgia, Armenia, Azerbaijan, Iraq, Iran, Lebanon, Jordan, Israel, Palestine, Saudi Arabia, Kuwait, Bahrain, Qatar, United Arab Emirates, Oman and Yemen. Cyprus is frequently considered to be part of the region but it has ethnic and cultural ties to Europe as well. The Israelite/Jewish civilization of the Fertile Crescent would have a profound impact on the rest of West Asia, giving birth to the Abrahamic faiths. In addition, the Jewish origins of Christianity, along with the many cultural contributions from both Jews and Arabs in Europe, meant that West Asian culture had left a lasting impact on Western civilization as well. Other indigenous West Asian religions include Zoroastrianism, Yazidism, Alevism, Druze and the Baháʼí Faith.

Today, almost 93% of West Asia's inhabitants are Muslim and is characterized by political Islamic, with the exception of Israel, a Jewish state. At its north-western end, Armenia and Georgia have an unmistakable Christian tradition, while Lebanon shares a large Christian and a large Muslim community. Ethnically, the region is dominated by Arab, Persian, Kurdish, Azerbaijani, and Turkish people. Among them smaller indigenous groups are the Jews, Assyrians, Druze, Samaritans, Yazidis and Mandeans. Many Middle Eastern countries encompass huge deserts where nomadic people live to this day. In great contrast, modern cities like Abu Dhabi, Dubai, Amman, Riyadh, Tel Aviv, Doha and Muscat have developed on the coastal lands of the Mediterranean Sea, the Persian Gulf and at the periphery of the Arabian Desert.

West Asian cuisine cuisine features a rich array of regional culinary traditions, shaped by diverse geographies, agricultural practices, and cultural exchanges. The literature is also immensely rich with Arabic, Jewish, Persian, and Turkish dominating.

== Architecture ==
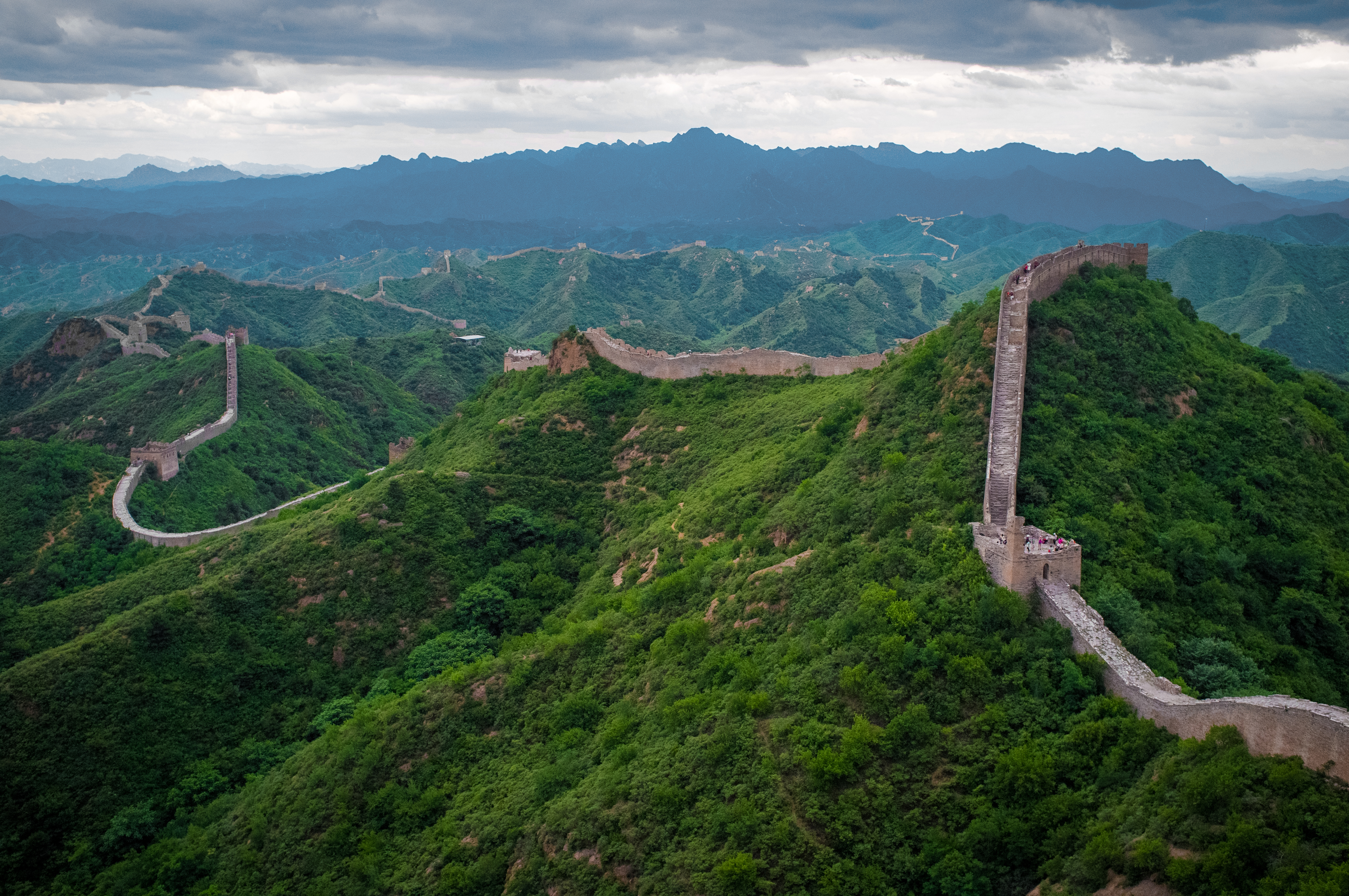
The Great Wall of China at Jinshanling

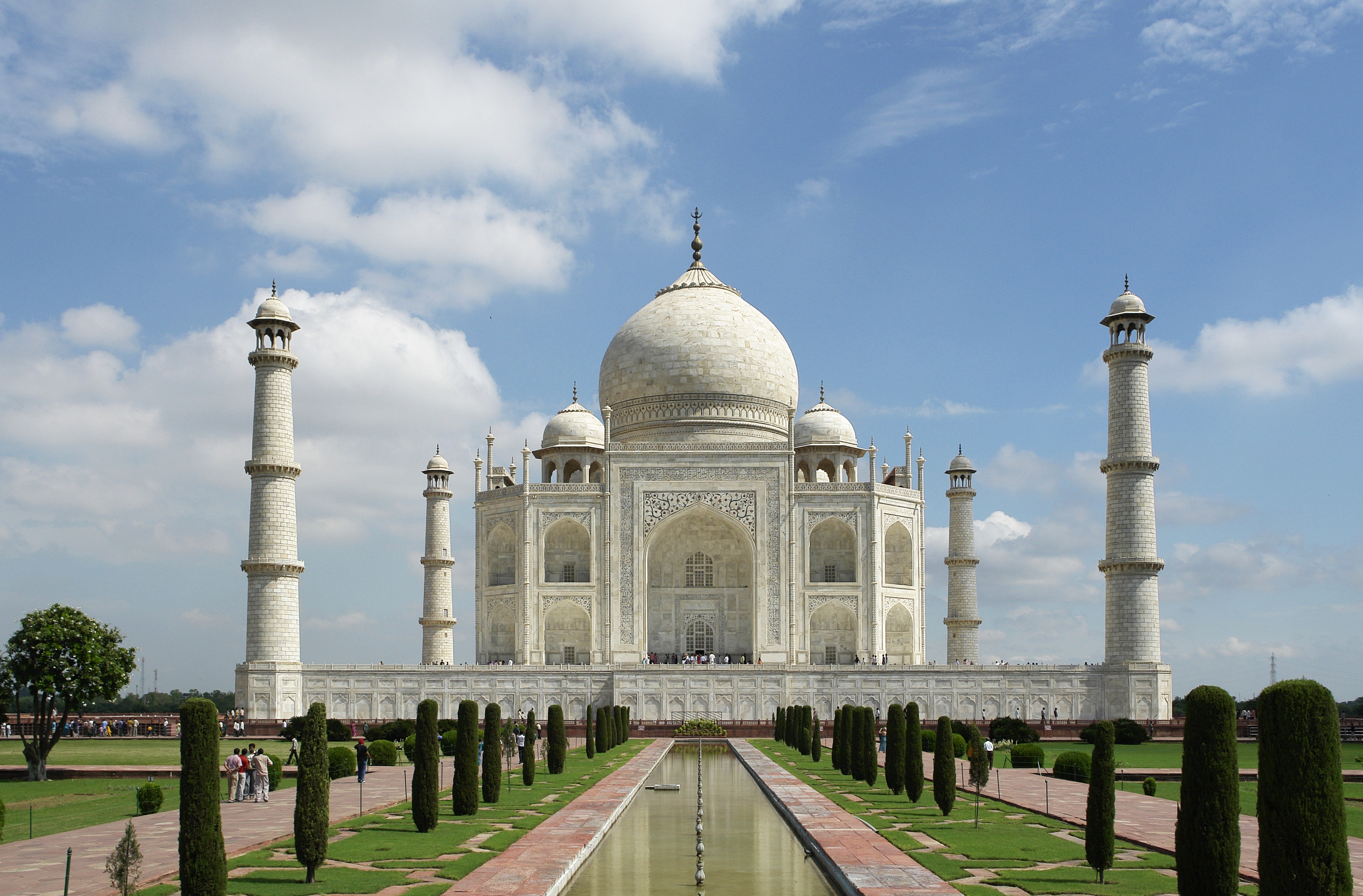
The Taj Mahal, Agra, India

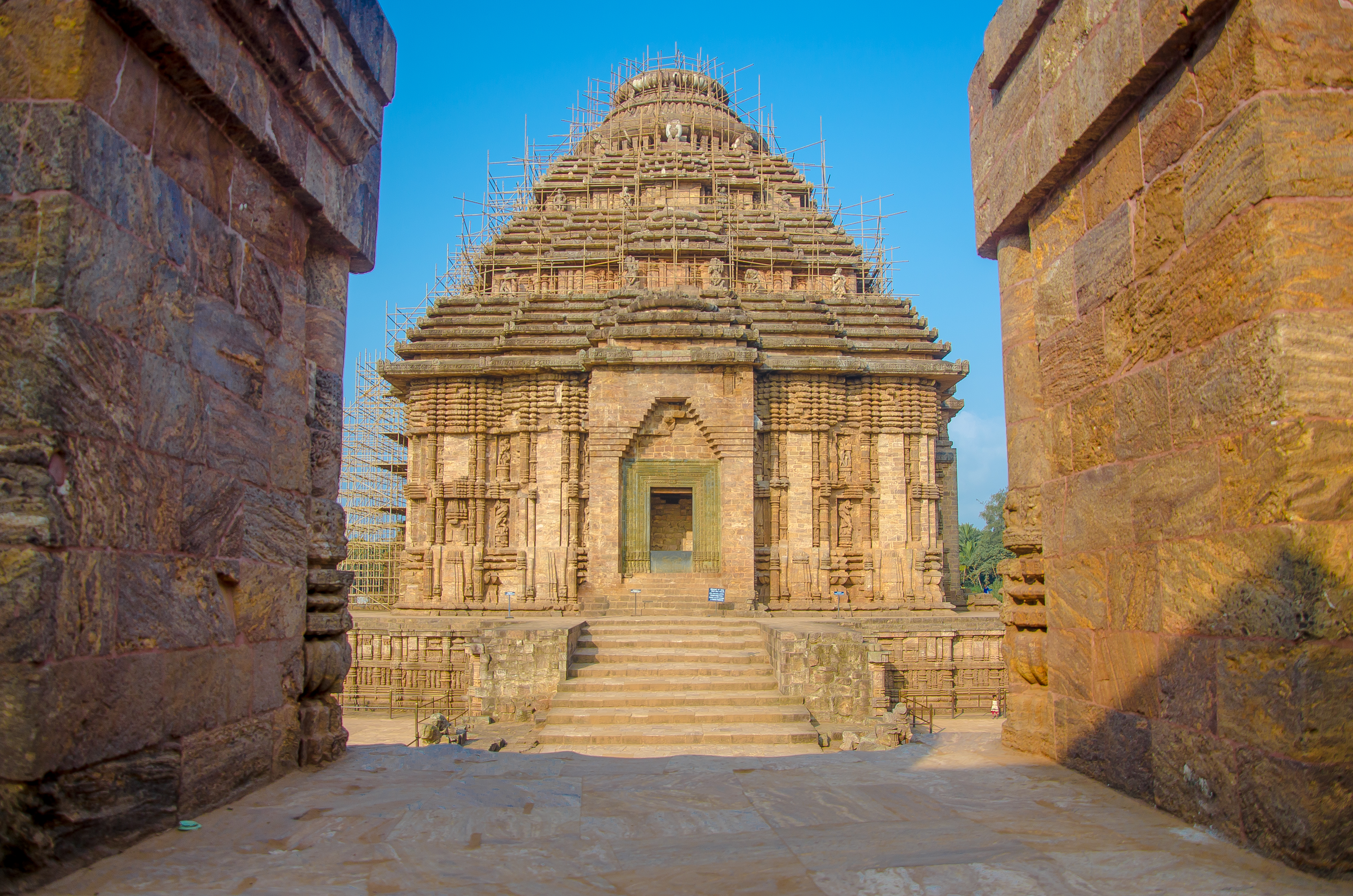
Sun temple at Konarka, Odisha, India

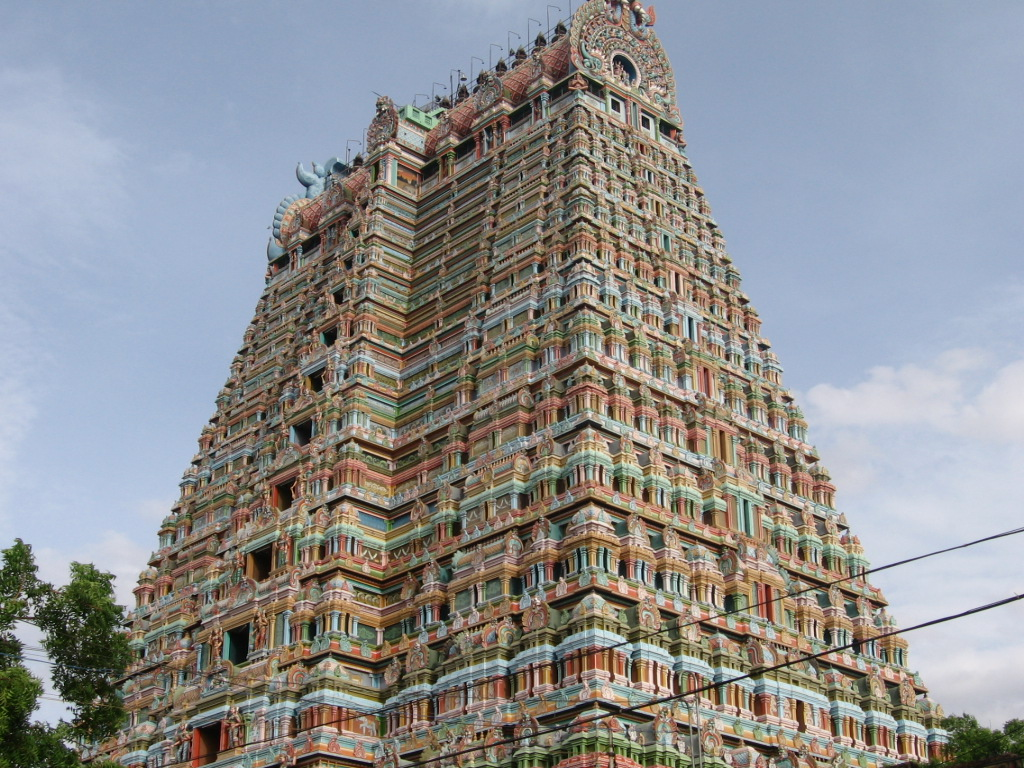
A typical example of Dravidian architecture

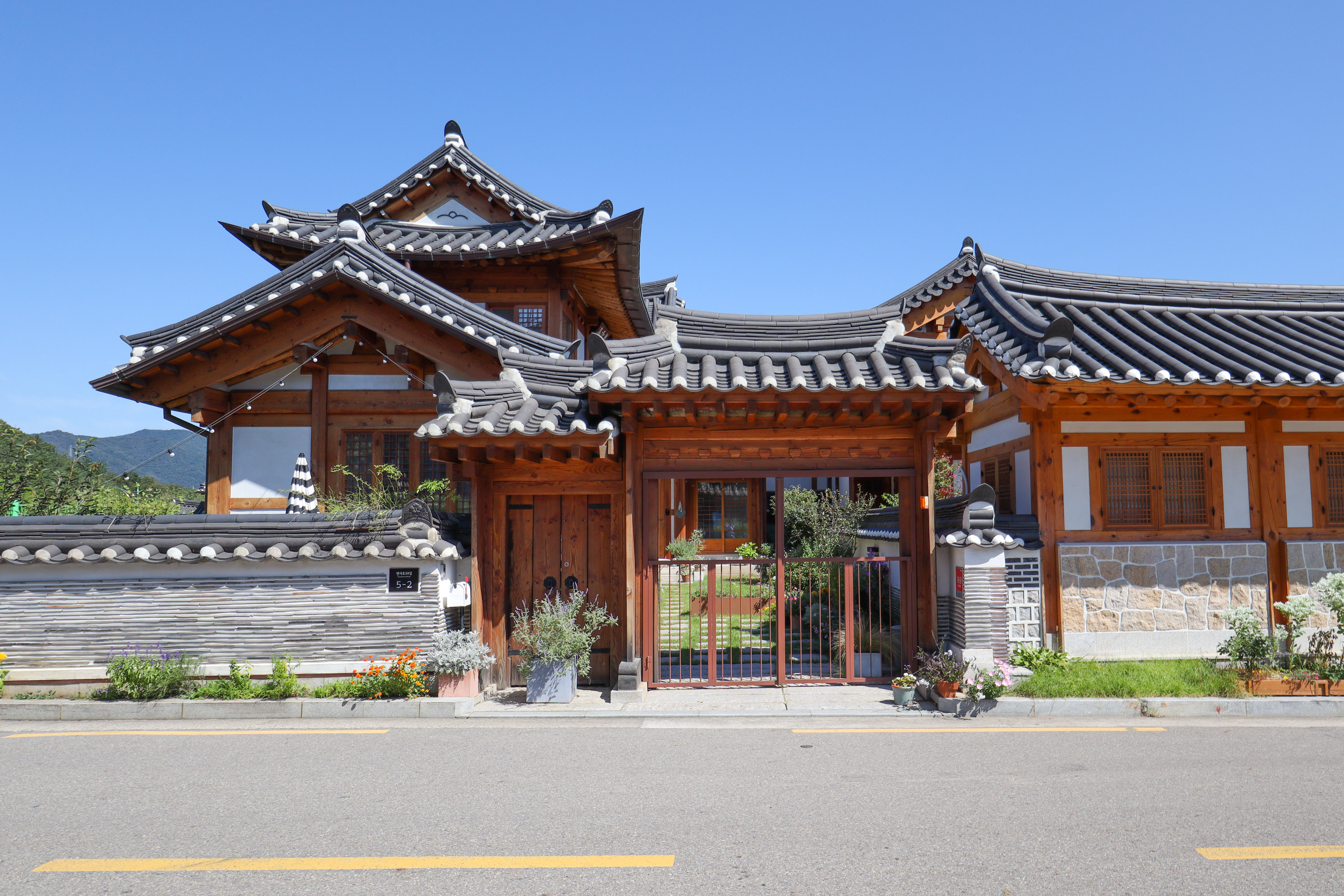
Eunpyeong Hanok Village in Seoul, South Korea

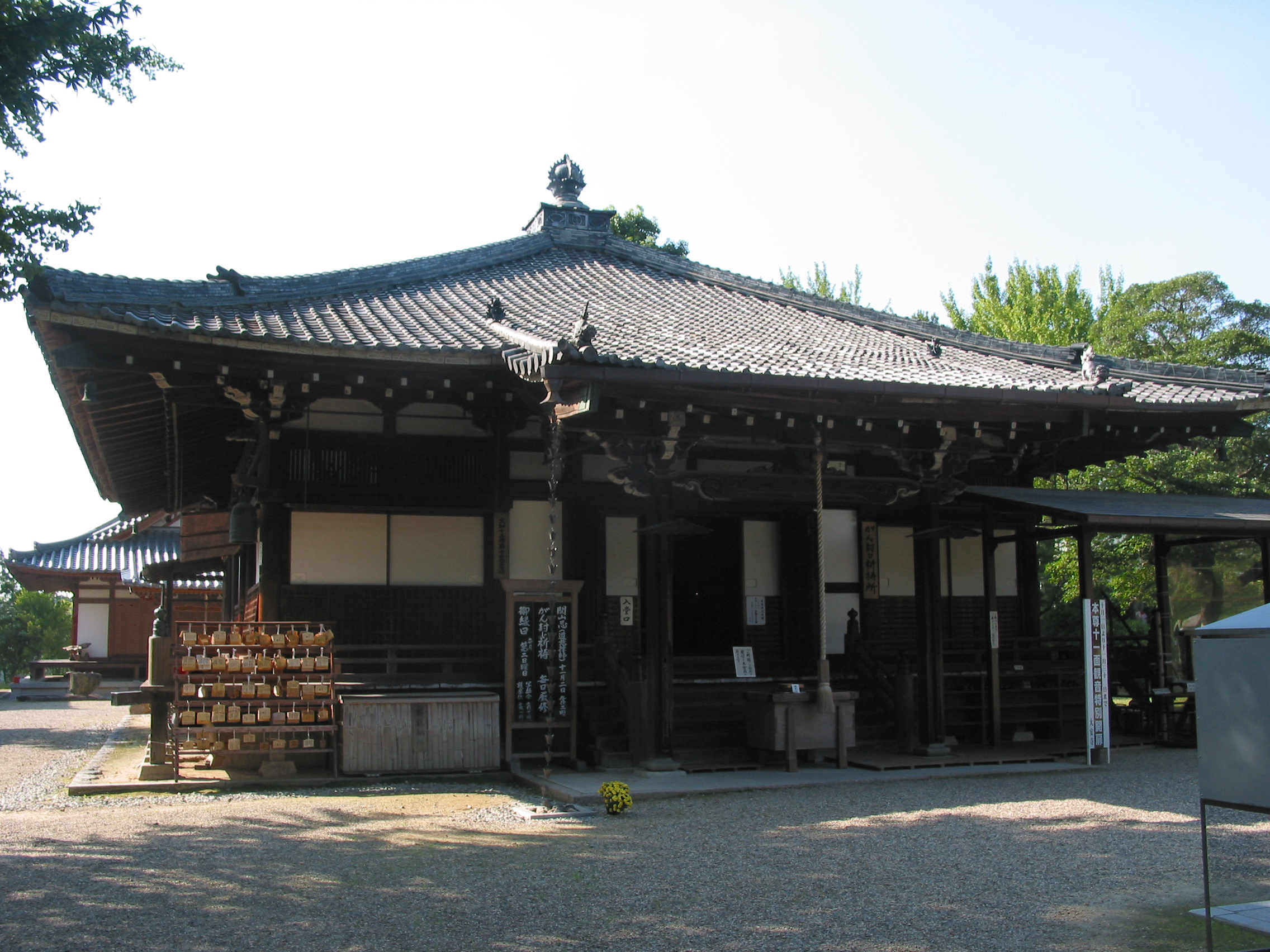
Daian-ji temple at Nara, Japan

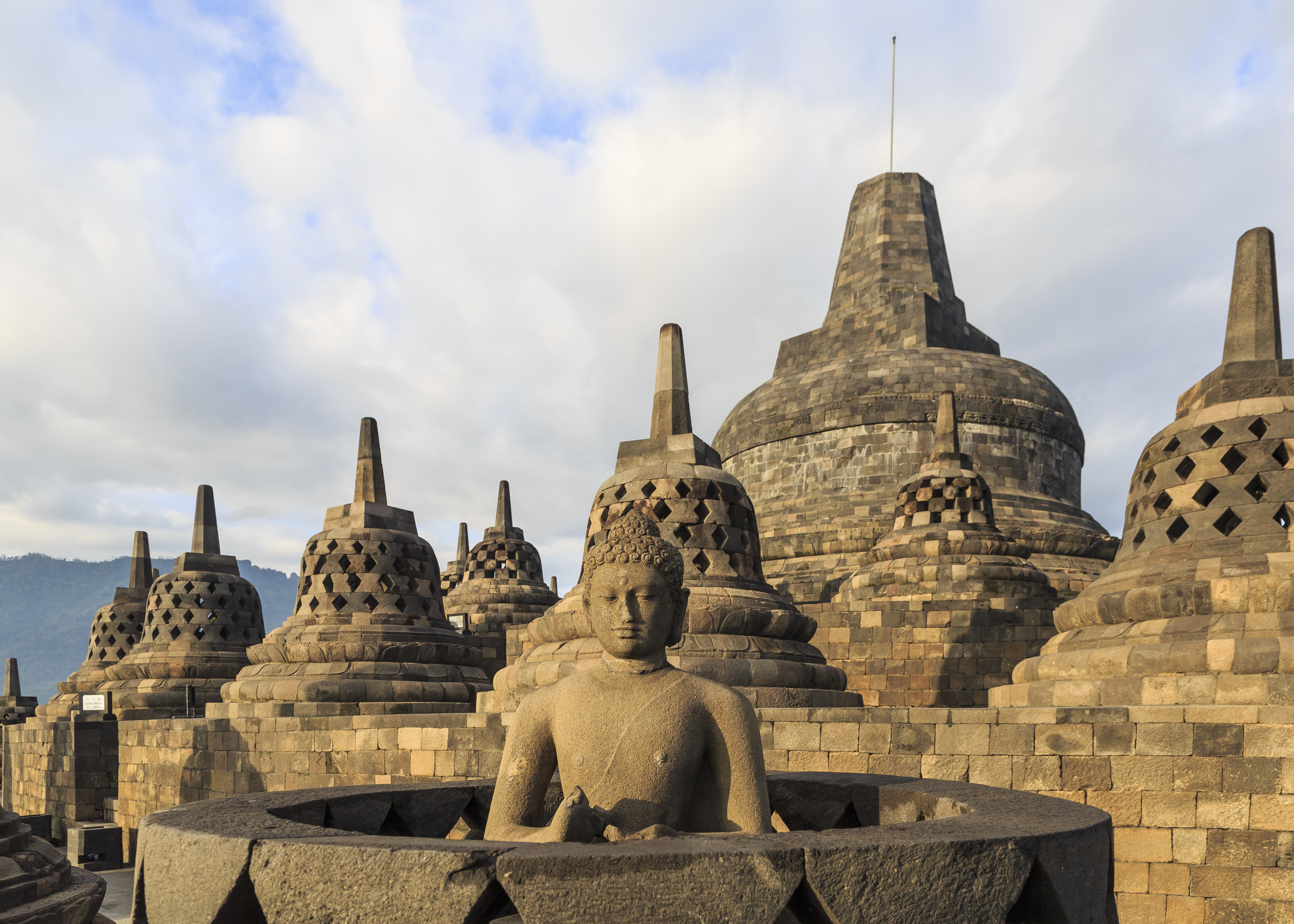
Borobudur, a Buddhist temple in Indonesia

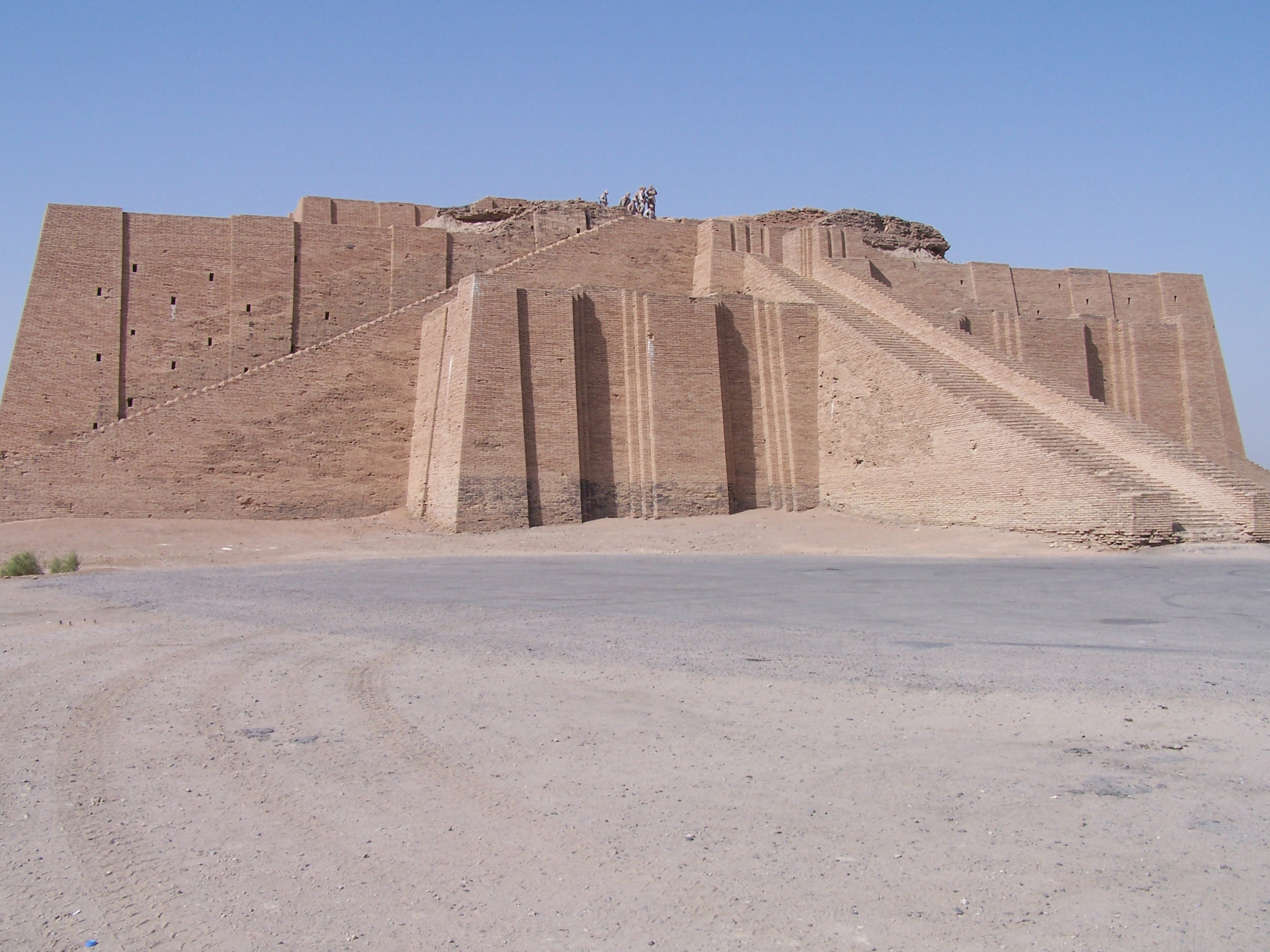
Ancient ziggurat, Iraq

Asia has a rich architectural heritage, with historic structures ranging from religious monuments and temples to castles, fortifications and palaces. However, many remarkable buildings and architectural sites have been lost over the centuries through destruction, neglect or dismantling. These include the ziggurats of Mesopotamia, sections of the Great Wall of China, ancient Greek and Hellenistic temples, and the royal cities of Persia.The architecture of a region reflects its history, culture and traditions. The choice of building materials, along with the forms, shapes, lines, curves and colours used in construction, gives each architectural style its own character and identity.

=== China ===
Chinese architecture has taken shape in East Asia over many centuries as the structural principles have remained largely unchanged, the main changes being only the decorative details. An important feature in Chinese architecture is its emphasis on articulation and bilateral symmetry, which signifies balance. Bilateral symmetry and the articulation of buildings are found everywhere in China, from palace complexes to humble farmhouses. Since the Tang dynasty, Chinese architecture has had a major influence on the architectural styles of Korea, Vietnam, and Japan.

=== India ===
Indian architecture is that vast tapestry of production of the Indian subcontinent that encompasses a multitude of expressions over space and time, transformed by the forces of history considered unique to the subcontinent, sometimes destroying, but most of the time absorbing. The result is an evolving range of architectural production that nonetheless retains a certain amount of continuity across history. Dravidian architecture in Southern India flourished under the Chola's, Vijayanagara, Satavahana, and many other southern Indian kingdoms until the Mughals occupation and followed by Britishers in India.

=== Korea ===
Korean architecture refers to an architectural style that developed over centuries in Korea. Just like in the case of other Korean arts, architecture tends to be naturalistic, favors simplicity, avoids the extremes and is economical with shapes.

=== Indonesia ===
The Indonesian architecture reflects the diversity of cultural, historical and geographic influences that have shaped Indonesia as a whole. It ranges from native vernacular architecture, Hindu-Buddhist temples, colonial architecture, to modern architecture.

Indonesian vernacular architecture is called rumah adat. The houses hold social significance in society and demonstrate local ingenuity in their relations to environment and spatial organisation. Notable examples include Rumah Gadang, Tongkonan, Balinese houses and Javanese Joglo. Hindu-Buddhist temple monument called candi, with the best example are Borobudur massive stone mandala-stupa and Prambanan Hindu temple dedicated to Trimurti gods. By the 16th century, the Portuguese followed by the Dutch colonize Indonesian archipelago, and developed European architecture technique and developed colonial architecture.

=== Japan ===
Japanese architecture is distinctive in that it reflects a deep ″understanding of the natural world as a source of spiritual insight and an instructive mirror of human emotion″. Attention to aesthetics and the surroundings is given, natural materials are preferred and artifice is generally being avoided. Impressive wooden castles and temples, some of them 2000 years old, stand embedded in the natural contours of the local topography. Notable examples include the Hōryū Temple complex (6th century), Himeji Castle (14th century), Osaka Castle (16th century) and Hikone Castle (17th century).

=== Vietnam ===
Traditional houses in Vietnam were characterized by wooden structures topped by steep roofs. The roofs would be covered with fish-scale tiles and curve outwards, while beams and rafters held up the main building. In some places, stilt houses were built and the houses usually had an odd number of rooms. However, the coming of various dynasties shaped cultural landmarks in the country in different ways. Palaces, pagodas and citadels flourished in Vietnam for over 500 years.

The Lý dynasty of the 11th century, for example, was deeply influenced by Buddhism and incorporated intricate reliefs and motifs into their architecture. In 1031, a staggering 950 pagodas were constructed by the reigning monarch Lý Thái Tông. During this period, rounded statues, door-steps, decorated roofs and bannisters were common features of Vietnamese architecture. The Imperial Citadel of Thăng Long, a UNESCO World Heritage Site now, is a must-visit for tourists looking to experience Vietnamese heritage up close. Located in present-day Hanoi, the citadel was the political center of the region for 13 centuries consecutively and will delight history buffs in particular. This magnificent structure is a fine example of Vietnamese architecture from the medieval era.

Trần dynasty, which gained a foothold in the 13th century, brought its own set of beliefs and customs that made its mark in Vietnam's architectural history. Buildings became more complex and demarcated, and gardens became a part of temples and places of worship. Tower-temples also emerged at this time; The Phổ Bình Tower in Nam Định province and Bình Sơn Tower in Vĩnh Phúc province are relics from the Trần dynasty.

=== Malay Peninsula ===
Various cultural influences, notably Chinese, Indian and Europeans, played a major role in forming Malay architecture. Until recent time, wood was the principal material used for all Malay traditional buildings. However, numerous stone structures were also discovered particularly the religious complexes from the time of Srivijaya and ancient isthmian Malay kingdoms.

=== West Asia ===
The ancient architecture of the region of the Tigris–Euphrates River system dates back to the 10th millennium BC and lead to the development of urban planning, the courtyard house, and ziggurats. The basic and dominant building material was the mudbrick, which is still in use in the region for the construction of residential structures. Kiln-burnt bricks were coated with a vitreous enamel for purposes of decoration and bitumen functioned as cement. Palaces or temples were constructed on terraces as rooms usually grouped round quadrangles, with large doorways and the roofs rested on richly ornamented columns.

== Art ==
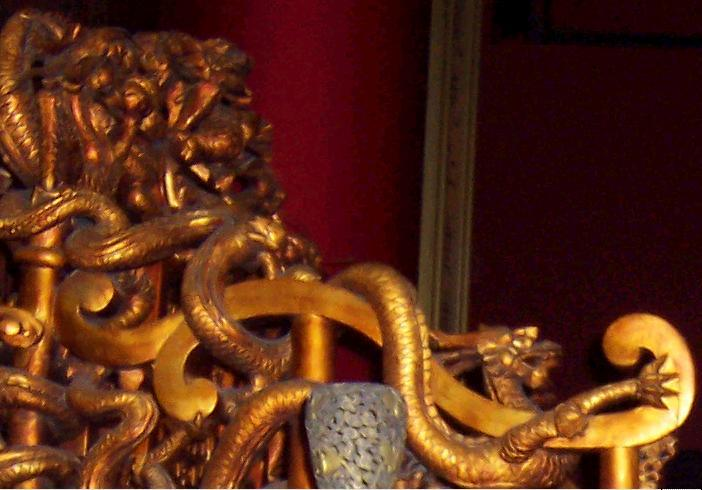
Detail of the Dragon Throne used by the Qianlong Emperor of China, Forbidden City, Qing dynasty. Artifact circulating in U.S. museums on loan from Beijing

Middle Eastern dance has various styles and has spread to the West in the form known as bellydancing. In the Punjab region of India and Pakistan, bhangra dance is very popular. The bhangra is a celebration of the harvest. The people dance to the beat of a drum while singing and dancing.

In Southeast Asia, dance is an integral part of the culture; the styles of dance vary from region to region and island to island. Traditional styles of dance have evolved in Thailand and Burma. The Philippines have their own styles of dance such as Cariñosa and Tinikling; during the Spanish occupation of the Philippines, practitioners of Filipino martial arts hid fighting movements into their dances to keep the art alive despite the fact that it was banned by the occupiers.

=== Martial arts ===
Martial arts figure prominently in many Asian cultures, and the first known traces of martial arts date from the Xia dynasty of ancient China from over 4000 years ago. Some of the best known styles of martial arts in the world were developed in East Asia, such as Karate from Okinawa, Judo from Japan, Taekwondo from Korea and the various styles of Chinese martial arts known collectively as kung fu. Ancient India was home to many martial arts that were mentioned in the Vedas such as Khadgavidya, Dhanurvidya, Gadayuddha, and Malla-yuddha. These various martial arts and communities flourished after the Vedic period. Many other styles of martial arts originated in Southeast Asia, Southeast Asian boxing from Indochina, Vovinam from Vietnam, Arnis from the Philippines, and Pencak Silat from Indonesia. In addition, popular styles of wrestling have originated in Turkey and Mongolia.

Development of Asian martial arts continues today as newer styles are created. Modern hybrid martial arts systems such as Jeet Kune Do and Krav Maga often incorporate techniques from traditional East Asian martial arts. Asian martial arts are highly popular in the Western world and many have become international sports. Karate alone has 50 million practitioners worldwide.

=== Cinema ===
Cinema is prominent in South Asia, where the Bollywood (representing the most-spoken language in the region of Hindi) and South Indian film industries vie for dominance. Pakistan's Lollywood also is growing, while historically, Bengali cinema was highly acclaimed by international film circles, with the movies of Satyajit Ray still praised today.

China's cinema has grown in recent decades, with the country also influencing the content of Hollywood productions by virtue of its large market. Hong Kong cinema was historically very influential, with kung fu films a major cultural export of the city for decades.

Japanese and Korean productions have become very popular recently; Japanese anime and manga have supplemented each other and become a part of world culture, while Korean films, dramas, and music (K-pop) have grown with much support from the Korean government. The 2019 Korean film Parasite was the first Asian film to win an Academy Award.

== Languages ==
Asia is a continent with great linguistic diversity, and is home to various language families and many language isolates. In fact, Asia contains almost every major language family except the Bantu languages. A majority of Asian countries have more than one language that is natively spoken. For instance, according to Ethnologue, over 600 languages are spoken in Indonesia while over 100 are spoken in the Philippines. The census of India of 2001 recorded 30 languages which were spoken by more than a million native speakers and 122 which were spoken by more than 10,000 people, with hundreds of other, smaller languages. Korea, on the other hand, is home to only one language.

The main languages found in Asia, along with examples of each, are:

- Afro-Asiatic: Arabic, Aramaic, Hebrew
- Altaic languages (not accepted to be a family but a convenient grouping): Japonic: Japanese, Ryukyuan; Korean; Mongolic: Buryat, Mongolian; Turkic: Azeri, Kazakh, Kyrgyz, Turkish, Turkmen; Tungusic: Manchu
- Austroasiatic: Khasi, Khmer, Mon, Santali, Vietnamese, Wa
- Austronesian: Bicolano, Cham, Ilocano, Javanese, Kapampangan, Kedayan, Malay (Indonesian & Malaysian), Minangkabau, Pangasinan, Sundanese, Tagalog, Tetum, Visayan (Cebuano, Hiligaynon, Waray)
- Chinese or Sino-Tibetan: Hakka, Hokkien (Taiwanese), Mandarin, Wu (Shanghainese), Yue (Cantonese), Burmese, Dzongkha, Lepcha, Meitei, Nepal Bhasa, Tibetan, Tshangla
- Miao–Yao: Hmong, Iu Mien
- Tai–Kadai: Bouyei, Isan, Kam, Lao, Shan, Thai, Zhuang
- Circassian: Kabardian
- Dagestanian: Chechen, Ingush
- Dravidian: Kannada, Malayalam, Tamil, Telugu and relatively less spoken languages such as Tulu, Kodagu etc...
- Georgian
- Indo-European: Armenian, Assamese, Bengali, Bhojpuri, Dhivehi, Gujarati, Hindustani (Hindi, Urdu), Kashmiri, Kurdish, Maithili, Marathi, Nepali, Odia, Pashto, Persian (Tajik and Dari), Punjabi, Sanskrit, Sindhi, Sinhala, Russian, Greek; as well as Romance-based creoles: Chavacano, Macanese
- Uralic: Khanty, Mari, Nenets, Permics

== Literature ==
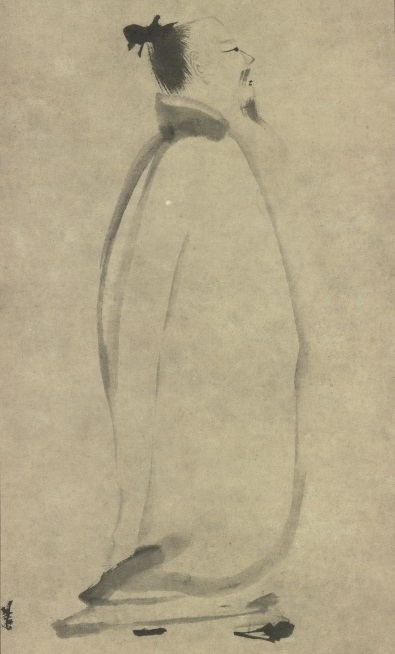
Tang dynasty Chinese poet Li Bai, in a 13th-century depiction by Liang Kai

=== Arabic ===
Arabic literature is the writing, both prose and poetry, produced by writers in the Arabic language. One of the most famous literary works of West Asia is One Thousand and One Arabian Nights.

=== Chinese ===
In Tang and Song dynasty China, famous poets such as Li Bai authored works of great importance. They wrote shī (Classical Chinese: 詩) poems, which have lines with equal numbers of characters, as well as cí (詞) poems with mixed line varieties.

=== Hebrew and Diaspora Jewish ===
Jewish literature consists of ancient, medieval, and modern writings by Jews, both in their original homeland and in the diaspora. A sizable amount of it is written in the Hebrew language, although there have been cases of literature written in Hebrew by non-Jews. Without doubt, the most important such work is the Hebrew Bible (Tanakh). Many other ancient works of Hebrew literature survive, including religious and philosophical works, historical records, and works of fiction.

=== Indian ===
The famous poet and playwright Kālidāsa wrote two epics: Raghuvamsham (Dynasty of Raghu) and Kumarasambhavam (Birth of Kumar Kartikeya); they were written in Classical Sanskrit rather than Epic Sanskrit some other examples of his plays are Abhigyanam Shakuntalam. Other examples of works written in Classical Sanskrit include the Pānini's Ashtadhyayi which standardized the grammar and phonetics of Classical Sanskrit. The Laws of Manu is an important text in Hinduism. Kālidāsa is often considered to be the greatest playwright in Sanskrit literature, and one of the greatest poets in Sanskrit literature, whose Recognition of Shakuntala and Meghaduuta are the most famous Sanskrit plays. He occupies the same position in Sanskrit literature that Shakespeare occupies in English literature. Some other famous plays were Mricchakatika by Shudraka, Svapnavasavadattam by Bhasa, and Ratnavali by Harsha. Later poetic works include Geeta Govinda by Jayadeva. Some other famous works are Chanakya's and Vatsyayana's Kamasutra.

=== Japanese ===
In the early eleventh century, court lady Murasaki Shikibu wrote Tale of the Genji considered the masterpiece of Japanese literatures and an early example of a work of fiction in the form of a novel. Early-Modern Japanese literature (17th–19th centuries) developed comparable innovations such as haiku, a form of Japanese poetry that evolved from the ancient hokku (Japanese language: 発句) mode. Haiku consists of three lines: the first and third lines each have five morae (the rough phonological equivalent of syllables), while the second has seven. Original haiku masters included such figures as Edo period poet Matsuo Bashō (松尾芭蕉); others influenced by Bashō include Kobayashi Issa and Masaoka Shiki.

=== Korean ===
Korean literature begins in the Three Kingdoms period, and continues through the Goryeo and Joseon dynasties to the modern day. Examples of Korean poetric forms include sijo and gasa, with Chŏng Ch'ŏl and Yun Sŏndo considered to be the supreme Korean poets. Examples of renowned Korean prose masterpieces include the Memoirs of Lady Hyegyeong, The Cloud Dream of the Nine and the Chunhyangjeon.

=== Pakistani ===
Pakistani literature has a rich history, and draws influences from both Persian, Muslim and Indian literary traditions. The country has produced a large number of famed poets especially in the national Urdu language. The famous Muhammad Iqbal, regarded as the national poet, was often called "The Poet of the East" (Shair-e-Mashriq). Their Urdu poetry is widely famous in the whole world. Many times "Mushairas" are held.

=== Vietnamese ===
The earliest surviving literature by Vietnamese writers is written in Chữ Hán or Văn ngôn (Classical Chinese). Almost all of the official documents in Vietnamese history were written in Chữ Hán, as were the first poems. Not only is the Chữ Hán foreign to modern Vietnamese speakers nowadays, these works are mostly unintelligible even when directly transliterated from Chinese into the modern Quốc ngữ script due to their Chinese syntax and vocabulary. As a result, these works must be translated into colloquial Vietnamese in order to be understood by the general public. These works include official proclamations by Vietnamese emperors, royal histories, and declarations of independence from China, as well as Vietnamese poetry. In chronological order notable works include:

- Thiên đô chiếu (遷都詔) 1010, Edict on transfer the capital of Đại Cồ Việt from Hoa Lư (modern Ninh Bình) to Đại La (modern Hanoi).
- Nam quốc sơn hà (南國山河) 1077, Mountains and rivers of the Southern country, poem by General Lý Thường Kiệt.
- Đại Việt sử ký (大越史記) Annals of Đại Việt by Lê Văn Hưu, 1272.
- Dụ chư tì tướng hịch văn 諭諸裨將檄文, Proclamation to the Officers, General Trần Hưng Đạo, 1284.
- An Nam chí lược (安南志略) Abbreviated Records of Annam, anon. 1335
- Gia huấn ca (家訓歌 The Family Training Ode), a 976-line Confucian morality poem attributed to Nguyễn Trãi 1420s
- Lĩnh Nam chích quái (嶺南摭怪) "The wonderful tales of Lĩnh Nam" 14th century, edited Vũ Quỳnh (1452–1516)
- Đại Việt sử lược (大越史略) Abbreviated History of Đại Việt, anon. 1377
- Việt điện u linh tập (越甸幽靈集), Spirits of the Departed in the Viet Realm, Lý Tế Xuyên 1400
- Bình Ngô đại cáo (平吳大誥), Great Proclamation upon the Pacification of the Wu Forces, Nguyễn Trãi 1428
- Đại Việt sử ký toàn thư (大越史記全書) Complete Annals of Đại Việt, Ngô Sĩ Liên 1479.
- Truyền kỳ mạn lục (傳奇漫錄, Collection of Strange Tales, partly by Nguyễn Dữ, 16th century
- Hoàng Lê nhất thống chí (皇黎一統志) Unification Records of the Le Emperor, historical novel ending with Gia Long. anon.
- Chinh phụ ngâm (征婦吟) "Lament of the soldier's wife", the original Chữ Hán version by Đặng Trần Côn d.1745
- Đại Việt thông sử (大越通史) history by Lê Quý Đôn 1749
- Vân đài loại ngữ (芸臺類語) encyclopedia Lê Quý Đôn 1773
- Phủ biên tạp lục (撫邊雜錄) Frontier Chronicles Lê Quý Đôn 1776
- Việt Nam vong quốc sử (越南亡國史), by Phan Bội Châu in Japan in 1905

Works written in chữ Nôm - a locally invented script based on chữ Hán - was developed for writing the spoken Vietnamese language from the 13th century onwards. For the most part, these chữ Nôm texts can be directly transliterated into the modern chữ Quốc ngữ and be readily understood by modern Vietnamese speakers. However, since chữ Nôm was never standardized, there are ambiguities as to which words are meant when a writer used certain characters. This resulted in many variations when transliterating works in chữ Nôm into chữ Quốc ngữ. Some highly regarded works in Vietnamese literature were written in chữ Nôm, including Nguyễn Du's Truyện Kiều, Đoàn Thị Điểm's chữ Nôm translation of the poem Chinh Phụ Ngâm Khúc (征婦吟曲 - Lament of a Warrior Wife) from the Classical Chinese poem composed by her friend Đặng Trần Côn (famous in its own right), and poems by the renowned poet Hồ Xuân Hương.

==== Other notable works include ====
- Chinh phụ ngâm (征婦吟) "Lament of the soldier's wife", translations from Chữ Hán into vernacular chữ Nôm by several translators including Phan Huy Ích and Đoàn Thị Điểm
- Cung oán ngâm khúc (宮怨吟曲) "Lament of the Concubine" by Nguyễn Gia Thiều d.1798
- Truyện Kiều (傳翹) "Tale of Kiều" epic poem by the blind poet Nguyễn Du
- Hạnh Thục ca (行蜀歌) "Song of Exile to Thục" Nguyễn Thị Bích, 1885
- Lục súc tranh công (六畜爭功) "The Quarrel of the Six Beasts"
- Lục Vân Tiên (蓼雲仙傳) epic poem by the blind poet Nguyễn Đình Chiểu d.1888
- Nhị độ mai (貳度梅) "The Plum Tree Blossoms Twice"
- Phạm Công – Cúc Hoa (范公菊花) Tale of Phạm Công and Cúc Hoa
- Phạm Tải – Ngọc Hoa (范子玉花) Tale of the orphan Phạm Tải and princess Ngọc Hoa
- Phan Trần (潘陳) The clan of Phan and the clan of Trần
- Quốc âm thi tập (國音詩集) "National pronunciation poetry collection" attributed to Nguyễn Trãi after retirement
- Thạch Sanh tân truyện (石生新傳) anon. 18th century
- Tống Trân and Cúc Hoa (宋珍菊花) Tale of Tống Trân and his wife Cúc Hoa
- Trinh thử (貞鼠) "The Virgin Mouse"
- Hoa tiên (花箋) The Flowered Letter

Modern literature While created in the seventeenth century, chữ Quốc ngữ was not widely used outside of missionary circles until the early 20th century, when the French colonial government mandated its use in French Indochina. During the early years of the twentieth century, many periodicals in chữ Quốc ngữ flourished and their popularity helped popularize chữ Quốc ngữ. While some leaders resisted the popularity of chữ Quốc ngữ as an imposition from the French, others embraced it as a convenient tool to boost literacy. After declaring independence from France in 1945, Empire of Vietnam's provisional government adopted a policy of increasing literacy with chữ Quốc ngữ. Their efforts were hugely successful, as the literacy rate jumped overnight.

In those early years, there were many variations in orthography and there was no consensus on how to write certain words. After some conferences, the issues were mostly settled, but some still linger to this day. By the mid-20th century, all Vietnamese works of literature are written in chữ Quốc ngữ, while works written in earlier scripts are transliterated into chữ quốc ngữ for accessibility to modern Vietnamese speakers. The use of the earlier scripts is now limited to historical references.

==== Works in modern Vietnamese include ====
- Việt Nam sử lược (越南史略) by Trần Trọng Kim 1921
- Số đỏ by Vũ Trọng Phụng 1936

=== Modern literature ===
The polymath Rabindranath Tagore, a Bengali poet, dramatist, and writer from India, became in 1913 the first Asian Nobel laureate. He won his Nobel Prize in Literature for notable impact his prose works and poetic thought had on English, French, and other national literature of Europe and the Americas. He also wrote Jana Gana Mana the national anthem of India as well as Amar Sonar Bangla the national anthem of Bangladesh. Moreover, translation of his another song “Namo Namo Matha" is the national anthem of Sri Lanka. This song was collected by his student Mr. Ananda Samarakoon and M. Nallathamby translated in Tamil language. Other Asian writers won Nobel Prizes in literature, including Yasunari Kawabata (Japan, 1966), and Kenzaburō Ōe (Japan, 1994). Yasunari Kawabata wrote novels and short stories distinguished by their elegant and spartan diction such as the novels Snow Country and The Master of Go.

== Family ==
Families have very great importance in Asian cultures. They teach their kids that the family is their protection and the major source of their identity. They expect loyalty from their children. Parents define the law and the children are expected to obey them. This is called filial piety, the respect for one's parents and elders, and it is a concept that originated in China as 孝 (xiao) with Confucian teachings. They are expected to have self-control, thus making it hard for them to express emotions, they are also expected to show respect through their motions and the way they speak. Children are expected to look after their parents when they grow older. Sons are expected to stay home, while daughters go and live with their husband's family. In Chinese culture, sometimes children are expected to care for their elders (赡养), and in various diaspora communities one may find Chinese children living with even their grandparents.

The practice of matrilocality in Korea started in the Goguryeo period, continued through the Goryeo period and ended in the early Joseon period. The Korean saying that when a man gets married, he is "entering jangga" (the house of his father-in-law), stems from the Goguryeo period.

== Philosophy ==
Asian philosophical traditions originated in India and China, and has been classified as Eastern philosophy covering a large spectrum of philosophical thoughts and writings, including those popular within India and China. The Indian philosophy include Jain philosophy, Hindu and Buddhist philosophies. They include elements of non-material pursuits, whereas another school of thought Cārvāka, which originated in India, and was propounded by Charvak around 2500 years before, preached the enjoyment of material world. Middle Eastern philosophy includes Islamic philosophy as well as Jewish and Iranian philosophy.

During the 20th century, in the two most populous countries of Asia, two dramatically different political philosophies took shape. Mahatma Gandhi gave a new meaning to Ahimsa, and redefined the concepts of nonviolence and nonresistance. During the same period, Mao Zedong's communist philosophy was crystallized.

== Religions ==
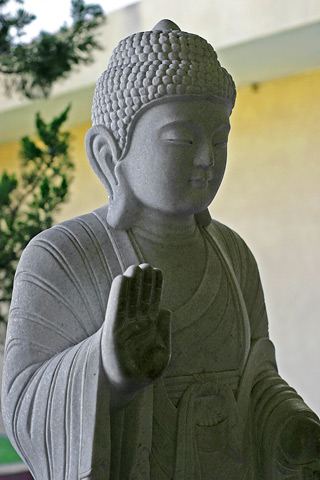
A stone image of the Buddha

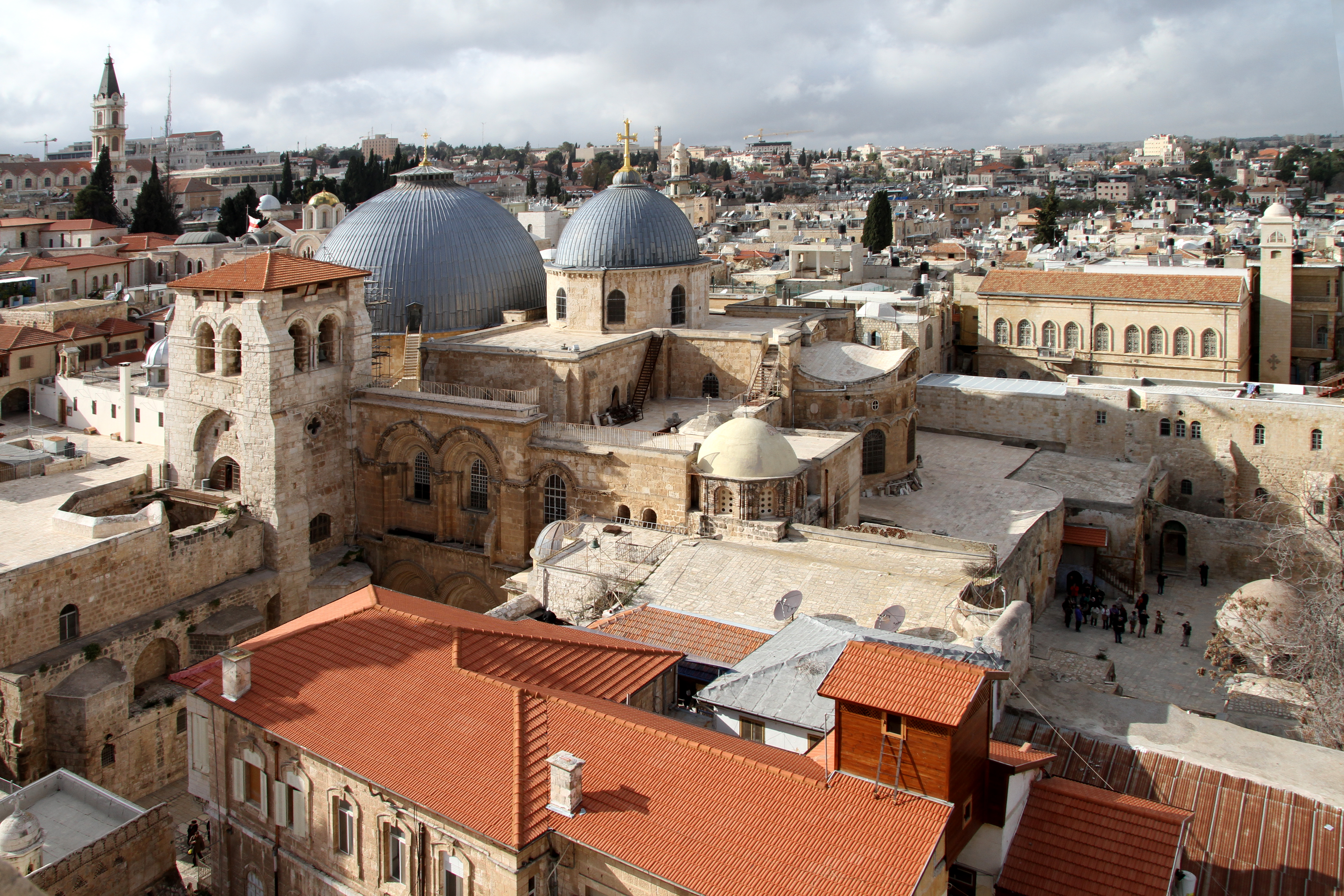
Church of the Holy Sepulchre in Jeruslam

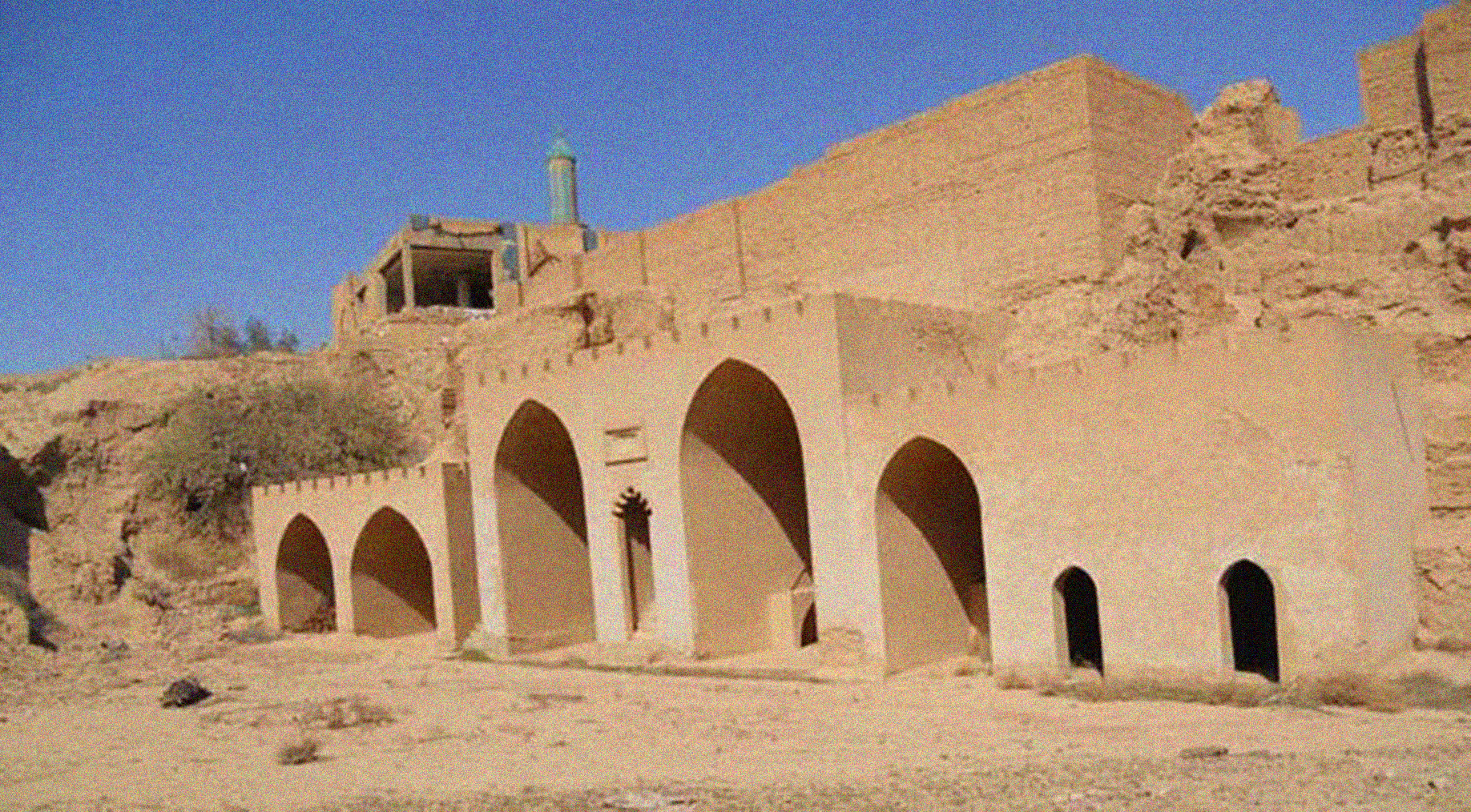
The Syriac Orthodox Saint Ahoadamah Church was a 7th-century church building in the city of Tikrit, one of the oldest in the world until its destruction by the Islamic State of Iraq and the Levant on 25 September 2014.

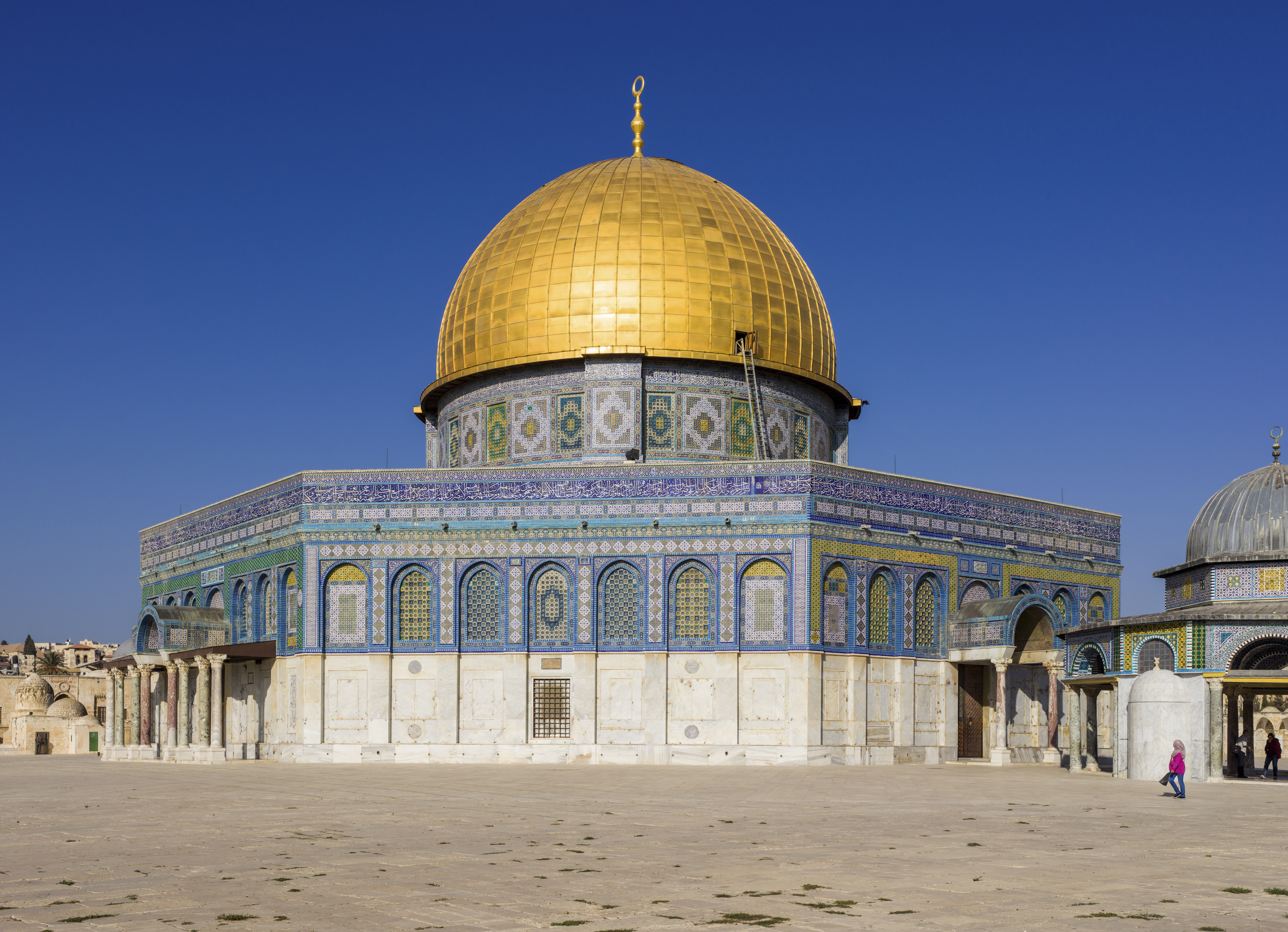
Dome of the Rock, an Islamic shrine in Jerusalem.

Asia is the birthplace of many religions such as Buddhism, Christianity, Confucianism, Druze, Hinduism, Islam, Jainism, Judaism, Mandaeism, Shintoism, Sikhism, Taoism, Yazdânism, and Zoroastrianism. All major religious traditions are practiced in the region and new forms are constantly emerging. The largest religions in Asia are Islam and Hinduism, both with approximately 1.1 billion adherents. In 2010, the Pew Research Center found five of the ten most religiously diverse regions in the world to be in Asia.

Hinduism, Buddhism, Jainism and Sikhism originated in India, a country of South Asia. In East Asia, particularly in China and Japan, Confucianism, Taoism, Zen Buddhism and Shinto took shape. Other religions of Asia include the Baháʼí Faith, Shamanism practiced in Siberia, and Animism practiced in the eastern parts of the Indian subcontinent.

Over 60% of the global Muslim population is in Asia. About 25% of Muslims live in the South Asian region, mainly in Pakistan, India, Bangladesh and the Maldives. If Afghanistan is counted, this number is even higher. The world's largest single Muslim community (within the bounds of one nation) is in Indonesia. There are also significant Muslim populations in the Philippines, Brunei, Malaysia, China, Russia, Central Asia and West Asia.

Christianity is a widespread religion in Asia with more than 286 million adherents according to Pew Research Center in 2010, and nearly 364 million according to Britannica Book of the Year 2014. In the Philippines and East Timor, Roman Catholicism is the predominant religion; it was introduced by the Spaniards and the Portuguese, respectively. In Russia, Georgia, and Armenia, Orthodox Christianity is the predominant religion. Eastern Christian sects are the most dominant denomination in Asia, having adherents in portions of the Middle East (the Levant Anatolia and Fars) and South Asia. Eastern churches include Assyrian Church of the East, Syriac Orthodox Church, Maronite Church, Syriac Catholic Church, Chaldean Catholic Church and Syro-Malabar Catholic Church, among others. Significant Christian communities also found in Central Asia, South Asia, Southeast Asia and East Asia. Judaism is the major religion of Israel.

Religions founded in Asia and with a majority of their contemporary adherents in Asia include:

| Religion | Image | Adherents | Followers in Asia | ref(s) |
|---|---|---|---|---|
| Baháʼí Faith | | 7 million | 3,433,000 | |
| Buddhism: Mahayana Buddhism; Theravada Buddhism; Vajrayana Buddhism | | 520 million | >400,000,000 | |
| Hinduism | | 984 million | >900,000,000 | |
| Judaism | | 14 million | 6,373,700 | |
| Islam: Ahmadiyya Islam; Shia Islam; Sunni Islam | | 2.1 billion | 1,160,000,000 | |
| Christianity: Syriac Christianity; Eastern Orthodox; Oriental Orthodox; Roman Catholic; Protestantism | | 2.4 billion | 286,100,000 - 364,000,000 | |
| Jainism | | >4.2 million | >4,200,000 | |
| Shinto | | Unknown | Unknown | |
| Sikhism | | 25 million | Unknown | |
| Taoism | | ~173 million | ~173 million | |
| Druze | | 1 million | >1 million | |
| Zoroastrianism | | 190,000 | Unknown | |
| Shamanism | | Unknown | Unknown | |
| Animism | — | Unknown | Unknown | |

== Festivals and celebrations ==
Asia has a variety of festivals and celebrations. In China, Chinese New Year, Dragon Boat Festival, and Mid-Autumn Moon Festival are traditional holidays, while National Day is a holiday of the People's Republic of China.

In Japan, Japanese New Year, National Foundation Day, Children's Day, O-bon, The Emperor's Birthday and Christmas are popular. According to Japanese syncretism, most Japanese celebrate Buddhism's O-bon in midsummer, Shinto's Shichi-Go-San in November, and Christmas and Hatsumoude in winter together.

In India, Republic Day and Independence Day are important national festivals celebrated by people irrespective of faith. Major Hindu festivals of India include Diwali, Dussehra or Daserra, Holi, Makar Sankranti, Pongal, Mahashivratri, Ugadi, Navratri, Ramanavami, Baisakhi, Onam, Rathayatra, Ganesh Chaturthi and Krishna Janmaashtami. Islamic festivals such as Eid ul-Fitr and Eid ul-Adha, Sikh festivals such as Vaisakhi, and Christian festivals such as Christmas, are also celebrated in India.

The Philippines is also tagged as the "Fiesta Country" because of its all-year-round celebrations nationwide. There is a very strong Spanish influence in their festivals, thus making the Philippines distinctively "Western", yet retaining its native Asian characteristics. Fiesta is the term used to refer to a festival. Most of these fiestas are celebrated in honor of a patron saint. To summarize it all, at least every city or municipality has a fiesta. Some prime examples include Sinulog from Cebu and Dinagyang of Iloilo. Other famous Philippine festivals include the MassKara Festival of Bacolod and Panagbenga Festival of Baguio.

In Indonesia, the Independence Day and the birthday of Pancasila are important. This Muslim majority country also celebrates Islamic celebrations and festivals, such as Eid ul-Fitr, Eid ul-Adha, Mawlid, Islamic New Year, Ashura, Tabuik, and Tasyrik day.

== Sports ==
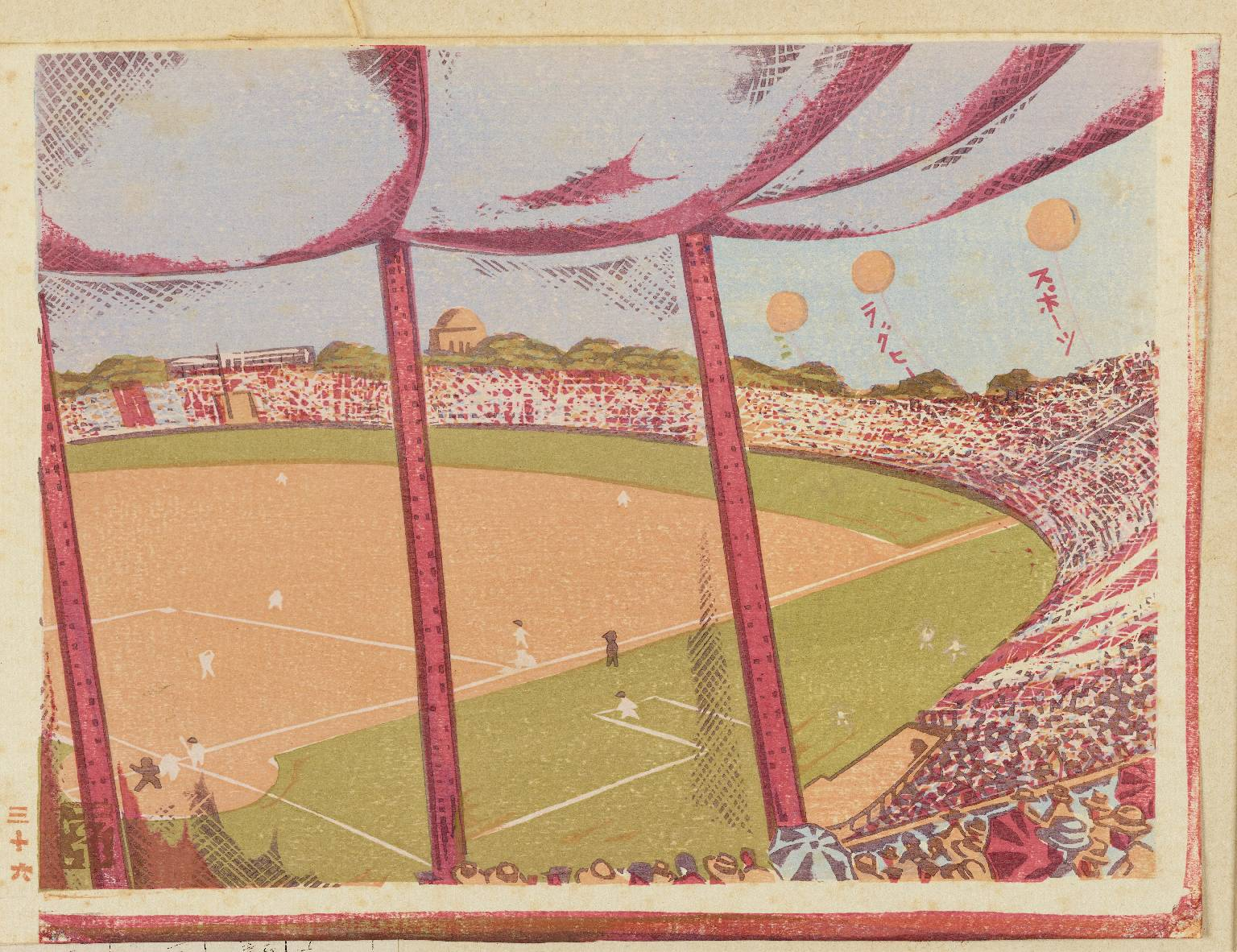
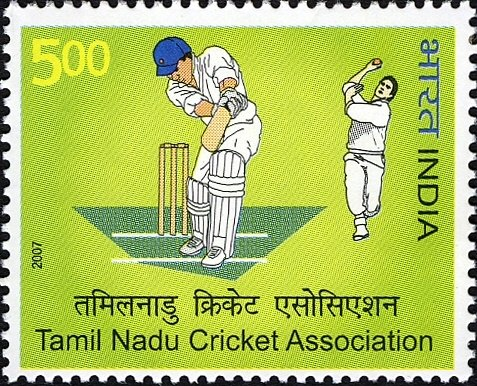
The bat-and-ball sports baseball (left) and cricket (right) are popular in East and South Asia respectively.

Due to the vastness of Asia, popularity of sports varies greatly across the continent.

Association football is widely popular in Asia. Boxing, badminton, and table tennis are very popular in East Asia. Baseball is popular in Japan, South Korea, and Taiwan. Cricket is especially popular in South Asia, having mainly been played in India, Pakistan, Bangladesh, and Sri Lanka, and more recently, in Nepal and Afghanistan. Traditional sports such as kabaddi and kho-kho also are watched to a significant extent in South Asia.

== Cuisine ==
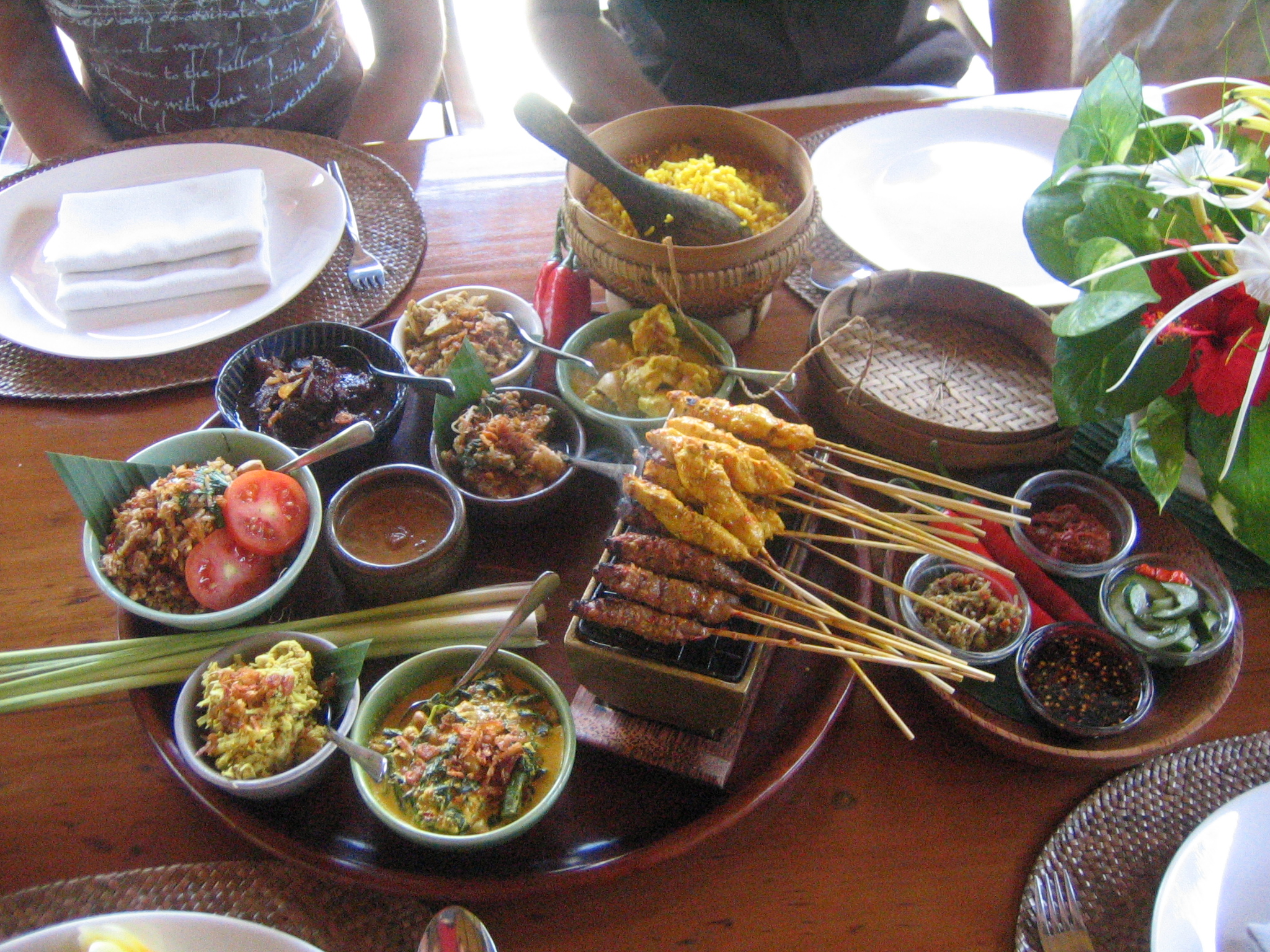
Indonesian Balinese cuisine

In many parts of Asia, rice is a staple food, and it is mostly served steamed or as a porridge known as congee. China is the world largest producer and consumer of rice. While grain flatbread were consumed in the Middle East to the Indian subcontinent.

Traditionally, it is a common practice in Central Asia, South Asia, West Asia, and some parts of Southeast Asia to eat using their bare hand. However, Western cutlery such as spoons and forks are currently being used increasingly and have also become widely available. With the advent of western cutlery, it may be viewed as rude in these nations to eat using the bare hands in some public places. While in China, Japan, Taiwan, Korea, and Vietnam, people usually use chopsticks to eat traditional food, but the shape of chopsticks are different in these countries. For example, Chinese chopsticks are long and square; Vietnamese chopsticks are long, being thick at one end and then gradually getting thinner at the other end, and are made of wood or bamboo; Japanese chopsticks are rounder, short, and spiral, having been designed to eat bony fish easily; Taiwanese chopsticks are made of materials such as bamboo, wood, and metal; Korean chopsticks are short, flat, and made of metal. It is said that wood is rarer than metal on the Korean Peninsula and that metal chopsticks can prevent poisoning. Fresh raw fish cuisines, such as sushi and sashimi are very popular in East Asia (especially Japan). These raw fish dishes were influenced by two major cultures: Chinese and Japanese.

In India, people often eat food with their hands, and many spices such as cardamom, cumin, and fennel seeds are used in every dish. Most spices originated within the Indian subcontinent. Durians are a common fruit in Southeast Asia, which, Alfred Russel Wallace, attested to its delicious flavor as worth the entire cost of his trip there.

The cuisine of Indonesia possess rich and diverse collection of dishes and recipes with regional cooking tradition flourished, such as Minang Sundanese to Balinese. Most Indonesians consume steamed rice with flavorful meat, fish, and vegetables in one serving such as in Nasi Padang and nasi campur. Other notable example include rendang, satay, soto, and nasi goreng.

In Filipino banquet, many unique dishes have arisen because of the country's long years of colonization and interactions with other neighboring cultures and nations; it has inherited Latin, Malay, Chinese, and American influences to its people's local blend.

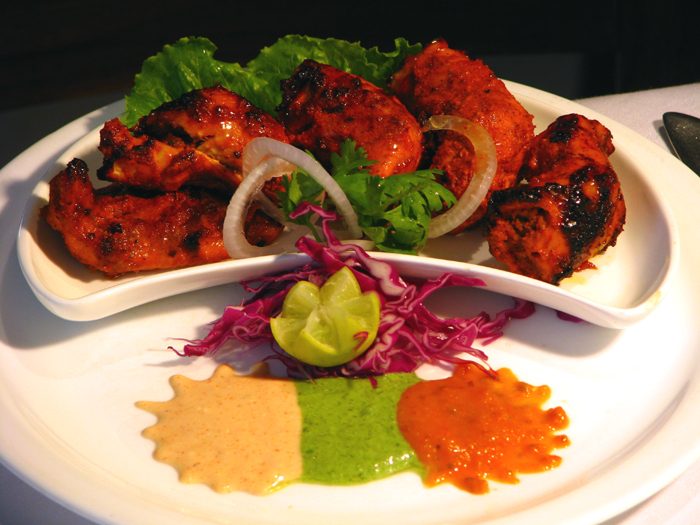
Chicken tikka, a well-known dish across the globe, reflects the South Asian cooking style.

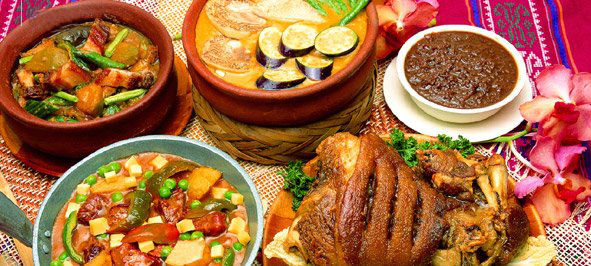
Philippine cuisine

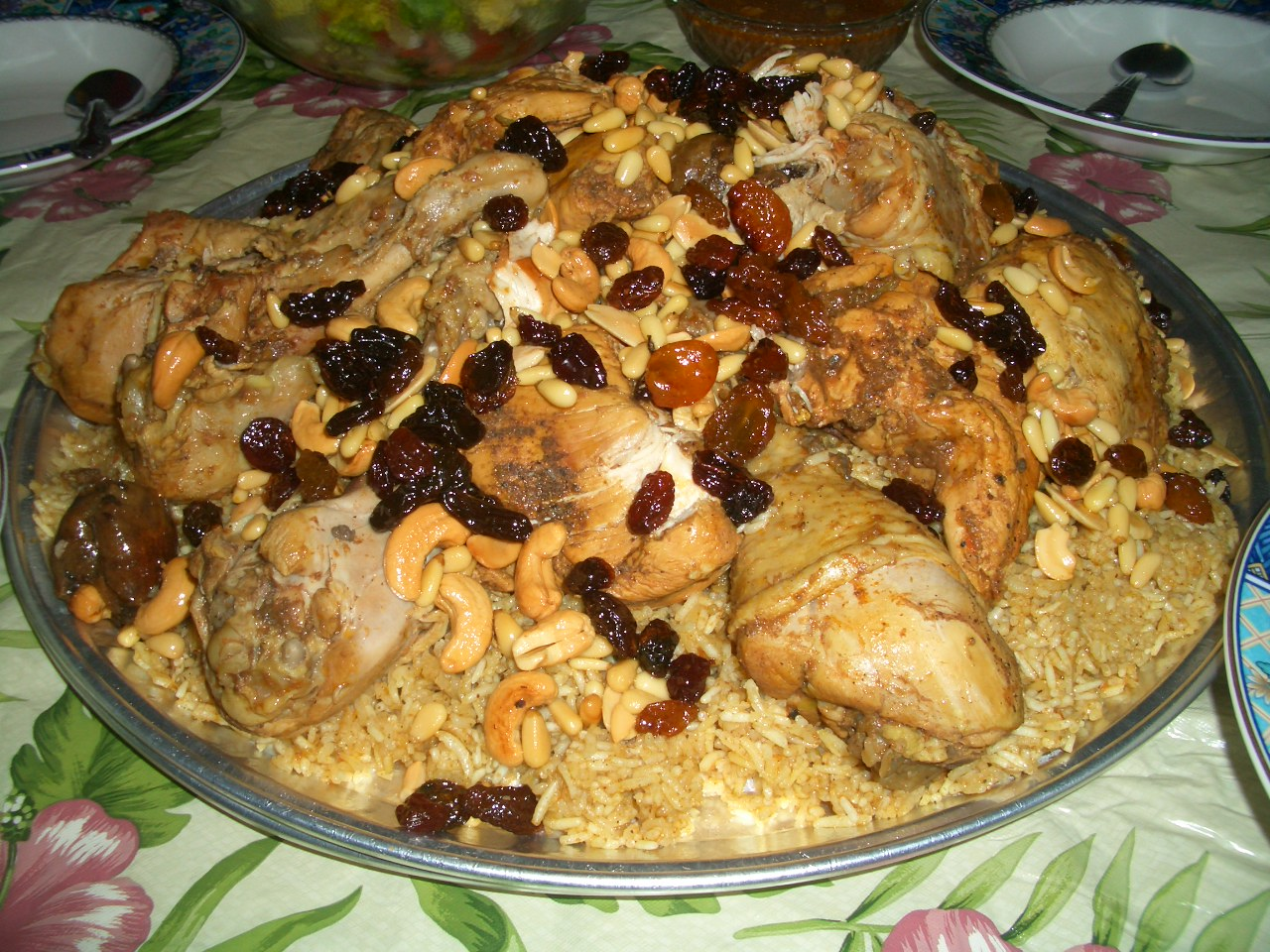
Kabsa also called Majboos, famous in Saudi Arabia, Kuwait, Qatar, Oman, Bahrain, and United Arab Emirates

== Cultural spheres ==
The culture of Asia is divided into several overlapping cultural spheres, including:

- Sinosphere
- Indosphere
- Persosphere
- Arabsphere

== Culture by people ==
- Afghan people
- Arab people
- Armenian people
- Assyrian people
- Aryan
- Azerbaijani people
- Baloch people
- Bangladeshi people
- Bengali people
- Betawi people
- Bihari people
- Buginese people
- Burmese people
- Chinese people
- Cambodian people
- Dravidian people
- Filipino people
- Georgian people
- Hadhrami people
- Haryanvi people
- Hmong people
- Hong Kong people
- Iranian people
- Indian people
- Indonesian people
- Igorot people
- Israeli people
- Japanese people
- Jat people
- Jewish people
- Korean people
- Kurdish people
- Lao people
- Macanese people
- Malay people
- Malaysian people
- Miao people
- Minangkabau people
- Mongolian people
- Moro people
- Marathi people
- Punjabi people
- Pakistani people
- Pashtun People
- Peranakan people
- Tibetan people
- Rajasthani people
- Rohingya people
- Romani people
- Russian people
- Sindhi people
- Tajik people
- Turkic peoples
- Taiwanese people
- Thai people
- Vietnamese people

== See also ==
- Culture of Africa
- Culture of Europe
- Culture of North America
- Culture of Oceania
- Culture of South America

== Notes ==
John Lindley (1889), Treasury of Botany vol 1. p. 435. Longmans, Green, & Co; New and rev. ed edition (1889)
