= Mallya Aditi International School =

Private school in Bangalore, India

Mallya Aditi International School
Established	1984
Location	Bangalore, India
Students	Approximately 650

Mallya Aditi International School (often abbreviated as MAIS or Aditi) is a private school located in New Town Yelahanka, Bangalore, India. In the 2024 CFore survey, Mallya Aditi International School is ranked among the top 10 schools in India and as one of the top 5 co-ed schools in Bengaluru.

== The school ==
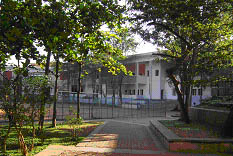
School campus

Mallya Aditi has a curriculum for its elementary school students that is designed to acquaint them with both Eastern and Western culture and methods of study. Aditi students study Indian languages, namely Kannada and Hindi, but can also study European and East Asian languages. Students are tutored in Western classical music as well as Indian dance and Indian classical music. Class sizes are generally small with roughly thirty students per classroom, meaning that students are able to receive personalized attention, and are able to grow and foster strong relationships with their peers and teachers. Aditi has received recognition for the excellence of its faculty. School has ISC topper for year 2019 with 100% score.

Examinations are held at the end of each academic year for grades 6, 7 and 8. For grades 9 and 10, a choice between the Indian Certificate of Secondary Education (ICSE) and the International General Certificate of Secondary Education (IGCSE) is offered. For grades 11 and 12, a choice between the Indian School Certificate (ISC) and the Advanced International Certificate of Education (AICE) is offered. IGCSE and AICE are conducted by the University of Cambridge International Examinations – CIE. Week-long internships are a compulsory part of the 12th-grade curriculum, through which students are able to gain exposure to the corporate world in fields of their interest.

== Clubs and facilities ==
Sports include basketball, football, cricket and swimming. School starts at 7:35 am and ends at 2:30 pm, with a breaks from 9:35–9:55 am, 11:30–11:36 and 1:10:1:40 pm

There are three computer labs serving the Junior School, the Senior School and the faculty. Alongside these computer labs, there are two technical hubs, which serve students and faculty with computers and educational material.

The Srishti School of Art Design and Technology – an affiliated school – is located on the Aditi campus.

The school produces plays, musicals and concerts. Now, Aditi has also started talent shows hosted by the 6th grade class. These talent shows usually have themes related to certain movie or music genres, and every class in Elementary school can participate. Student organisations include/have included the Dramatic Society, Model United Nations, Insight Club (sociology based debate club), Debating, Quiz and Chess Clubs, a school choir, the MAIS Film Club, Robotics Club, Rutuchakra, Aviation club, film and book club and the Photography Club.

Aditi students have their own newspapers and magazines. Past student publications include The Joke, Silhouette, The Scribbler, The White Crayon, The Big Issue, Aditi Spectrum and The Wise Guy. The current student Magazine is "The Scribe". A Kannada magazine was also launched in 2015.

The school's teams in football and basketball perform well in inter-school events. Aditi's football field is less than a third the size of a true football field (pentagon shape) and an astroturf surface as of 2014. The sports teams have excelled in many inter-school tournaments. The school also has an indoor basketball court as well as a swimming pool. Badminton nets are also available.

Aditi students of all grades have a Domains of Development (DOD) week every year. DOD is a learning project undertaken by MAIS. A week is allotted for DOD for grades 5 to 12. MAIS has identified four Domains of Development: personal, social, experiential and aesthetic. So one grade might attend a workshop in pottery and paper-making and another might go to Chennai to study South Indian music and dance while another might go rock climbing and trekking. The graduating class takes up a project under 'social useful productive work' for a week instead.A lot of Rich children study here including the children of Ministers
