= Phạm Tải – Ngọc Hoa =

The Story of Phạm Tải and Ngọc Hoa (Phạm Tải – Ngọc Hoa) is an anonymous 18th Century Vietnamese language epic poem of 934 verses.

The poem belongs to the genre of vernacular nôm script verse poems which includes Phạm Công – Cúc Hoa, Nhị độ mai ("The Plum Tree Blossoms Twice"), Lục súc tranh công ("The Struggle of the Six Animals"), the tale of Thạch Sanh, the tale of Chử Đồng Tử, the tales of Trạng Quỳnh, the tale of Tống Trân and Cúc Hoa, the Truyện Trinh thử ("Tale of the Virgin Mouse"), and the Hạnh Thục ca ("Lament while fleeing to Thục"). Interest in these vernacular Vietnamese-language poems was reawakened early in the nationalist cultural movement. As with another Vietnamese epic poem, the Tale of Tống Trân and Cúc Hoa, the Tale of Phạm Tải and Ngọc Hoa has also entered Thai tradition in a narrative translation.

== Plot ==
Phạm Tải is an orphan, and Ngọc Hoa is the daughter of a wealthy mandarin family. Their romance ends violently with Ngọc Hoa killing herself to protect Phạm Tải from the king.
