= Rutuchakra =

Indian menstrual equity organisation

RutuChakra (alternatively stylised Rutuchakra) is a youth-led organisation which has worked in the field of menstrual hygiene, inclusivity and dignity, predominantly in India since 2018. Through its 20+ chapters across India, it has provided over 200,000 menstrual products to underprivileged persons. The organization has been active throughout the COVID-19 pandemic, donating more than 50,000 products as of 2020. The organisation depends on several crowdfunding channels to raise funds for its activities. RutuChakra collaborates with Non-Governmental Organisations such as ThayiMane, Mitra Jyothi and Sandesh to provide sanitary napkins and workshops. For its work, the founder has received several accolades including the Renaissance Award (Economically Inclusive).

== History ==
Rutuchakra was founded in 2018 by Sanjana Dixit, an Ashoka Young Changemaker, with a founding team of 12 other individuals including current Directors, Soumya Gupta, Nikita Dhamija and Aryan Dixit. It began as a fundraising venture which raised 4.5 lakhs in its initial campaign.
