= Madhu Singhal =

- Born: Madhu Singhal; Haryana, India
- Occupation: Social Reformer
- Years active: 1990–present

Madhu Singhal is a social activist who works on projects for people with disabilities. The social activities taken upon by her focuses on promoting education and generating job opportunities for people with disabilities. She has won National Award for the Empowerment of Persons with Disabilities in 2008. She is the founder of Mitra Jyothi which serves people with disabilities.

== Early life and education ==
She was born in Haryana with permanent visual disability. Doctors advised that there was no treatment available to recover from her disability. She pursued her education with assistance from a Braille teacher. After 6th Grade, she moved to a regular school to continue her studies. She completed her graduation (B.A.) with 1st Division and was selected “The Best All Rounder Student” from ‘Vaish Women College’, Maharishi Dayanand University, Rohtak (Haryana), and completed M.A. with 1st Division, specialization in Hindustani Classical Vocal Music from Government College for Women, Maharishi Dayanand University, Rohtak (Haryana).

== Personal life ==
Madhu relocated to Kanpur after the death of her father. She was able to make a network of individuals with disabilities during her stay. When she relocated to Bangalore with aid of her brother-in-law Mr. G. P. Goyal, she was inspired to resume her activities in Bangalore. After coming to Bangalore she learnt Kannada and soon started Mitra Jyothi with the support from Mr.G.P Goyal and eight other individuals.

== Mitra Jyothi ==
Madhu Singhal is the Managing Trustee/Founder of Mitra Jyothi which is a charitable trust registered under Indian Trust Act. She established Mitra Jyothi in 1990 along with the support of 8 other individuals including her brother-in-law, Mr. G. P. Goyal. Programs being conducted by Mitra Jyothi include Talking Book Library, Computer Training Center, Independent Living Skills, Braille Transcription Center and Job Placement. The activities were recognized with a State Award in 2010 from the Directorate of Disabled Welfare and Senior Citizens, Government of Karnataka for its service for persons with disabilities. Mitra Jyothi is a member of the DAISY Forum of India (DFI). It conducts residential course for visually impaired women. The Independent Living Skills course included mobility and orientation, home management and maintenance, crafts, self-defence skills, personality development, health and hygiene.

== Positions held ==
- Founder and Managing Trustee of Mitra Jyothi since 1990.
- Life Member of Association of People with Disability.
- General Secretary of Daisy Forum of India.
- Chairperson of the Women's Committee of Asian Blind Union from 2008 to 2012.
