= Phạm Công – Cúc Hoa =

The Tale of Phạm Công and Cúc Hoa (范公菊花 Phạm Công – Cúc Hoa) is an anonymous 18th Century Vietnamese language poem written in luc bat verse and vernacular chu nom script. As with two similar poems, Phạm Tải – Ngọc Hoa and Tống Trân and Cúc Hoa, the title is made of the two names of a star-crossed couple, the boy Phạm Công and the girl Cúc Hoa.
