= Truyện Trinh thử =

15th-century Vietnamese poem

Trinh thử (貞鼠, "The Virgin Mouse") by Hồ Huyền Quy is a 15th-century Vietnamese Nôm poem in 850 lines in lục bát verse.
