= Phan Trần =

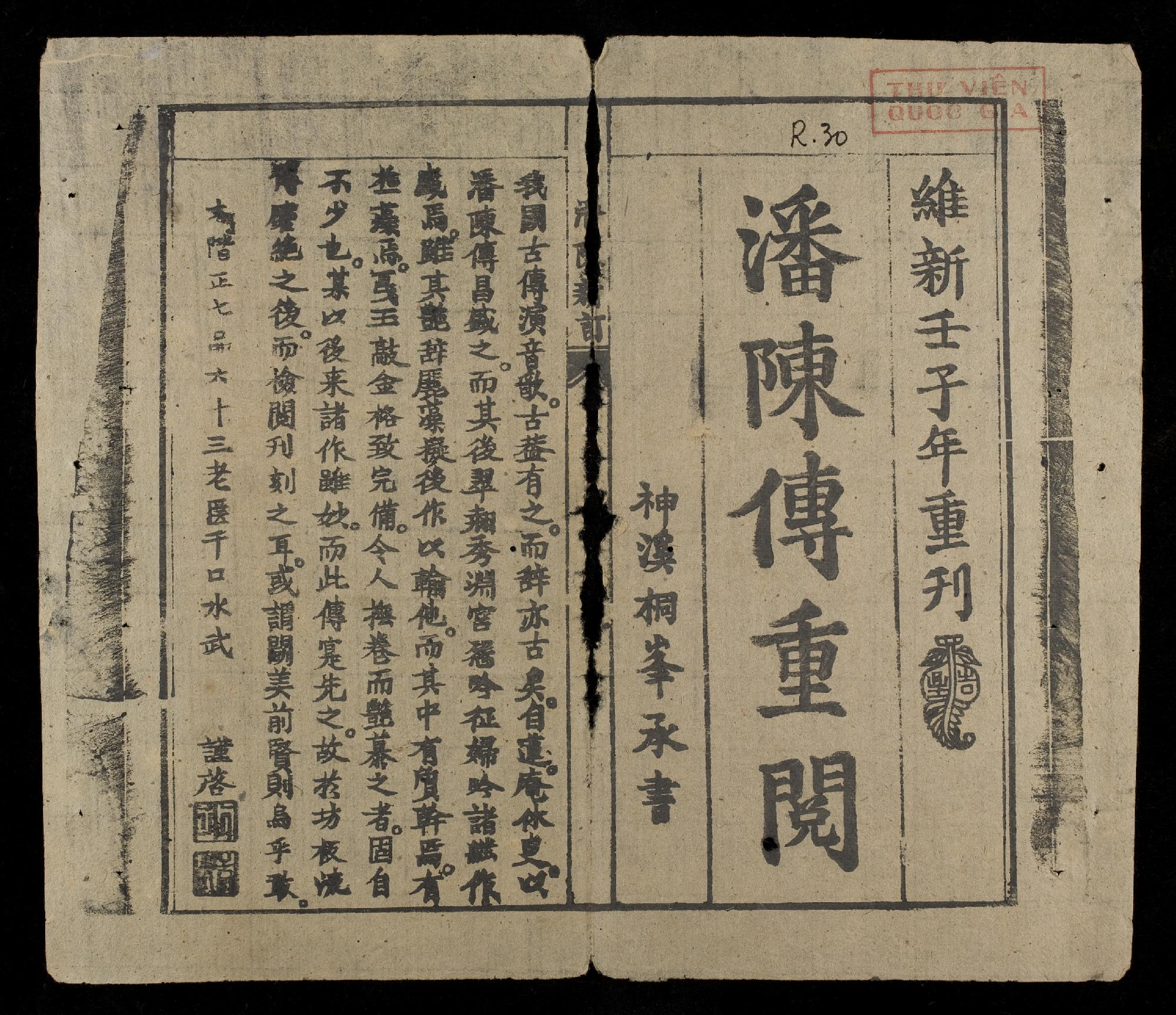
The front page of Phan Trần truyện trùng duyệt

Phan Trần (Vietnamese: Phan Trần truyện, chữ Hán: 潘陳傳) is an anonymous Vietnamese language epic poem in lục bát verse originally written in chữ Nôm. It was first transcribed into the Latin-based modern Vietnamese alphabet in 1889.

There was a saying that "Men should not talk about the story of Phan Trần, women should not talk about The Tale of Kiều," because the plot of Phan Trần concerns romantic emotions of a man, Phan Sinh, who falls in love with Diệu Thường, a girl from the Trần family even though his parents have arranged another marriage.

First 8 lines of Phan Trần
Vietnamese Alphabet (chữ Quốc Ngữ)
Trên am thong thả sách, cầm,
Nhàn nương án ngọc, buồn ngâm quyển vàng.
Thấy trong triều Tống Tĩnh khang,
Một chàng Hòa quận, một chàng Đàm chu,
Bảng vàng, bia đá nghìn thu,
Phan, Trần hai họ, cửa nho dõi truyền.
Kể từ đèn sách thiếu niên,
Một song tình nặng, một thuyền nghĩa sâu.
