= Mitra Jyothi =

Bangalore charity trust

Mitra Jyothi established in 1990 (36 years ago), is a charitable trust registered under Indian Trust Act based in Bangalore. Its aims to support the visually impaired through various programs it offers. These programs include Talking Book Library, Computer Training Center, Independent Living Skills, Braille Transcription Center and Job Placement. It received State Award in 2010 from the Directorate of Disabled Welfare and Senior Citizens, Government of Karnataka for its exemplary service for persons with disabilities. Mitra Jyothi is also a member of the DAISY Forum of India (DFI). DFI is a forum of Not for profit organizations from India who are involved in production of books and reading materials in accessible formats for persons who cannot read normal print.

== Founder ==
Ms Madhu Singhal, who is visually impaired herself, is the Managing Trustee/Founder of Mitra Jyothi. She established Mitra Jyothi in 1990 along with the support of 8 other individuals. She was given National Award in December 2008 for achievement in working for the cause of people with disabilities. She was also awarded “Saduru Gnanananda Awardees 2011” in the category Woman Social Entrepreneur, empowering the visually impaired.

== Programs ==
=== Talking Book Library ===
Library has collection of converted Audio Cassettes and CD’s of printed books. Volunteers help in recording Audio master cassettes and CDs at recording rooms. Library also produces a monthly audio magazine called 'Sanchaya'. The audiobooks are in the Digitally Accessible Information System (DAISY), which is the standard system of navigating through audio files for people with visual impairment and these audio CDs in DAISY format are made out of books and are also stored as master CDs and they also have an online library catalogue so that people can call up library and place an order for a particular audio book and they make a copy of the CD and post it to them. In case they don't have a book they take order and make attempt to convert them to DAISY format and in some cases the members send them the physical copy which can be used for conversion to DAISY format and add to their library collection. Currently the library has a collection of close to 3,000 books in English as well as four regional languages including Tamil and Hindi and a large number of these books are in Kannada as majority of their beneficiaries study in schools across Karnataka. The organisation also provides audio books for students studying Economics and Psychology at the Masters level.

=== Computer Training Centre ===
Established in 2005 Computer Training Centre provides computer training to the visually impaired and low vision students. They are offered programs including basic computer training courses for visually impaired and Teacher Training courses for teachers. The organisation trains around twenty students per batch and starts with basic instructions on how to operate a keyboard or monitor and gradually trains on to sending emails and simple text editing and finally on how to use various Microsoft Office Products and during this period students from all over the sub-continent live in dormitories during the six-month long programme.

=== Independent Living Skills ===
It is a residential training program for visually impaired women in the age group of 18 to 35 years. These women are taught life skills like mobility, home management skills, cooking, hygiene etc.

=== Braille Transcription Centre ===
Braille Transcription Centre is used to convert books required by visually impaired students into Braille. The team also makes efforts to make reading more accessible to visually impaired people by collecting funds for publishing 30 braille books in Kannada due to technology and financial constraints of the members in case of audio books. The organisation also observed that all visually impaired children start learning and studying using only braille and only if children are financially well off do they get to access electronic media.

=== Placement Cell ===
Established in 1999 Placement Cell helps visually impaired, and also people with other disabilities, find job opportunities according to their skills in various sectors. It also conducts Sensitization programs for both employers and employees.
