= Tống Trân and Cúc Hoa =

Vietnamese poem

The Tale of Tống Trân and Cúc Hoa (宋珍菊花 Tống Trân Cúc Hoa) is a traditional epic poem in lục bát verse from 18th or 19th Century Vietnam. The poem is anonymous. The poem was widely published in the early days of Vietnamese printing, including engraved plates with illustrations. It is counted as one of the principle works of the chữ Nôm script verse-story genre.

== Plot ==
Tống Trân is a poor student. When Cúc Hoa his wife dies Tống Trân, as Orpheus in Greek myth, descends into the underworld to seek from the Emperor of the Underworld her release, which he receives.
