= Peasant =

Agricultural laborer or farmer with limited land ownership

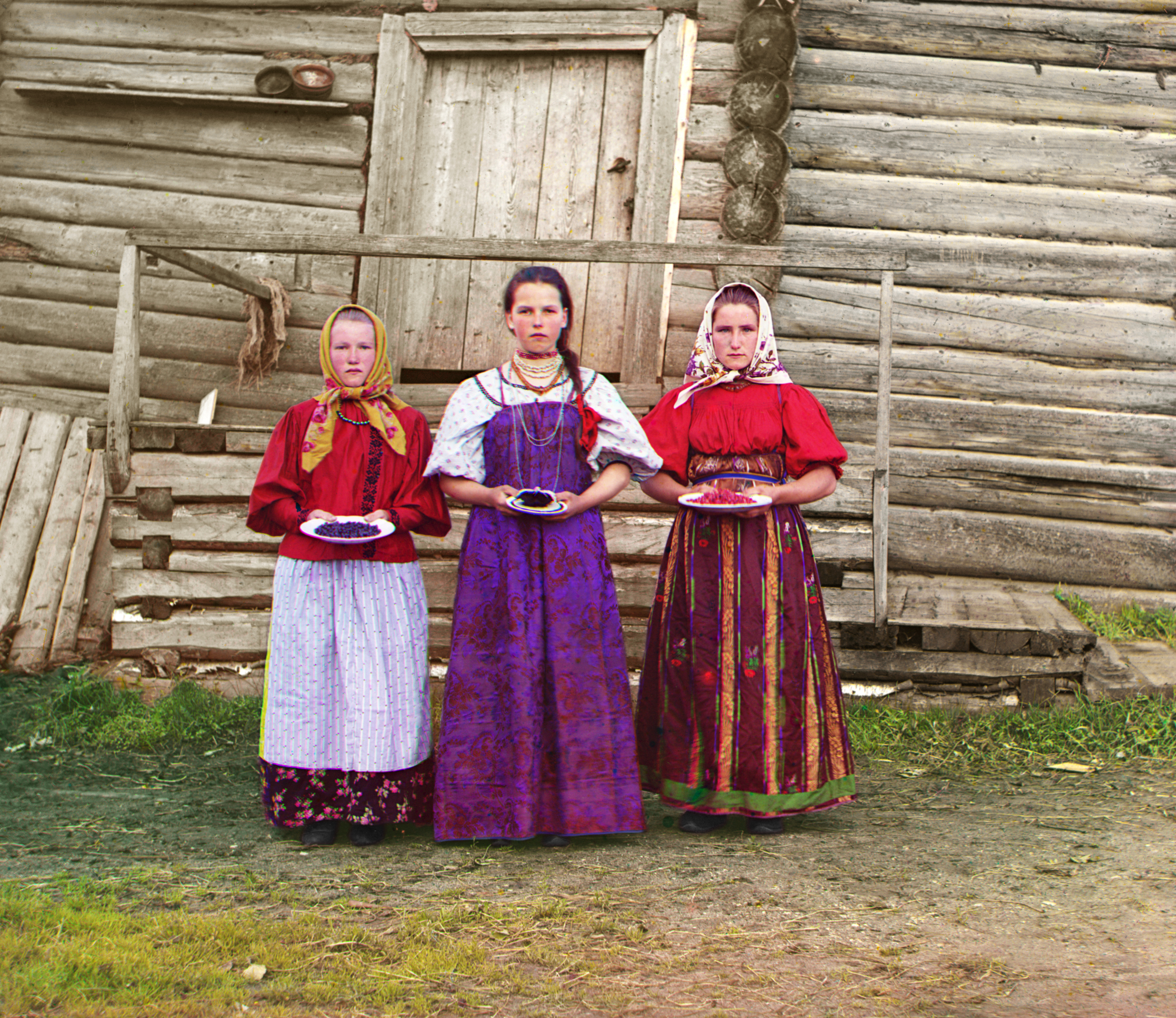
Young women offer berries to visitors to their izba home, 1909. Those who had been serfs among the Russian peasantry were officially emancipated in 1861. Photograph by Sergey Prokudin-Gorsky.

A peasant is a pre-industrial agricultural laborer or a farmer with limited land-ownership, especially one living in the Middle Ages under feudalism and paying rent, tax, fees, or services to a landlord. In Europe, three classes of peasants existed: non-free slaves, semi-free serfs, and free tenants. Peasants might hold title to land outright (fee simple), or by any of several forms of land tenure, among them socage, quit-rent, leasehold, and copyhold.

In some contexts, "peasant" has a pejorative meaning, even when referring to farm laborers. As early as in 13th-century Germany, the concept of "peasant" could imply "rustic" as well as "robber", as the English term villain/villein. In 21st-century English, the word "peasant" can mean "an ignorant, rude, or unsophisticated person". The word rose to renewed popularity in the 1940s–1960s as a collective term, often referring to rural populations of developing countries in general, as the "semantic successor to 'native', incorporating all its condescending and racial overtones".

The word peasantry is commonly used in a non-pejorative sense as a collective noun for the rural population in the poor and developing countries of the world. Via Campesina, an organization claiming to represent the rights of about 200 million farm-workers around the world, self-defines as an "International Peasant's Movement" as of 2019. The United Nations and its Human Rights Council prominently use the term "peasant" in a non-pejorative sense, as in the UN Declaration on the Rights of Peasants and Other People Working in Rural Areas adopted in 2018. In general English-language literature, the use of the word "peasant" has steadily declined since about 1970.

== Etymology ==
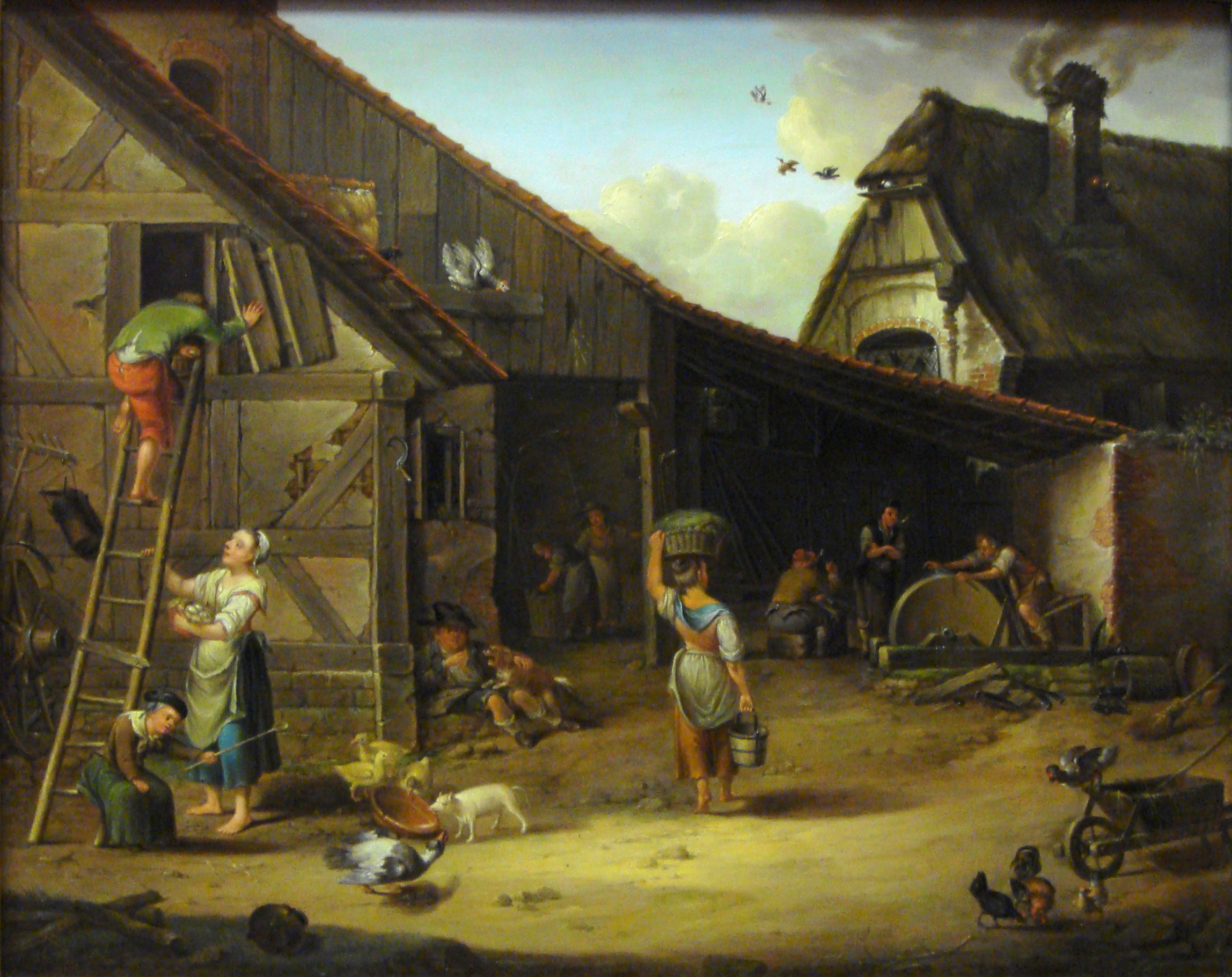
A farm in 1794

The word "peasant" is derived from the 15th-century French word païsant, meaning one from the pays, or countryside; ultimately from the Latin pagus, or outlying administrative district.

== Social position ==
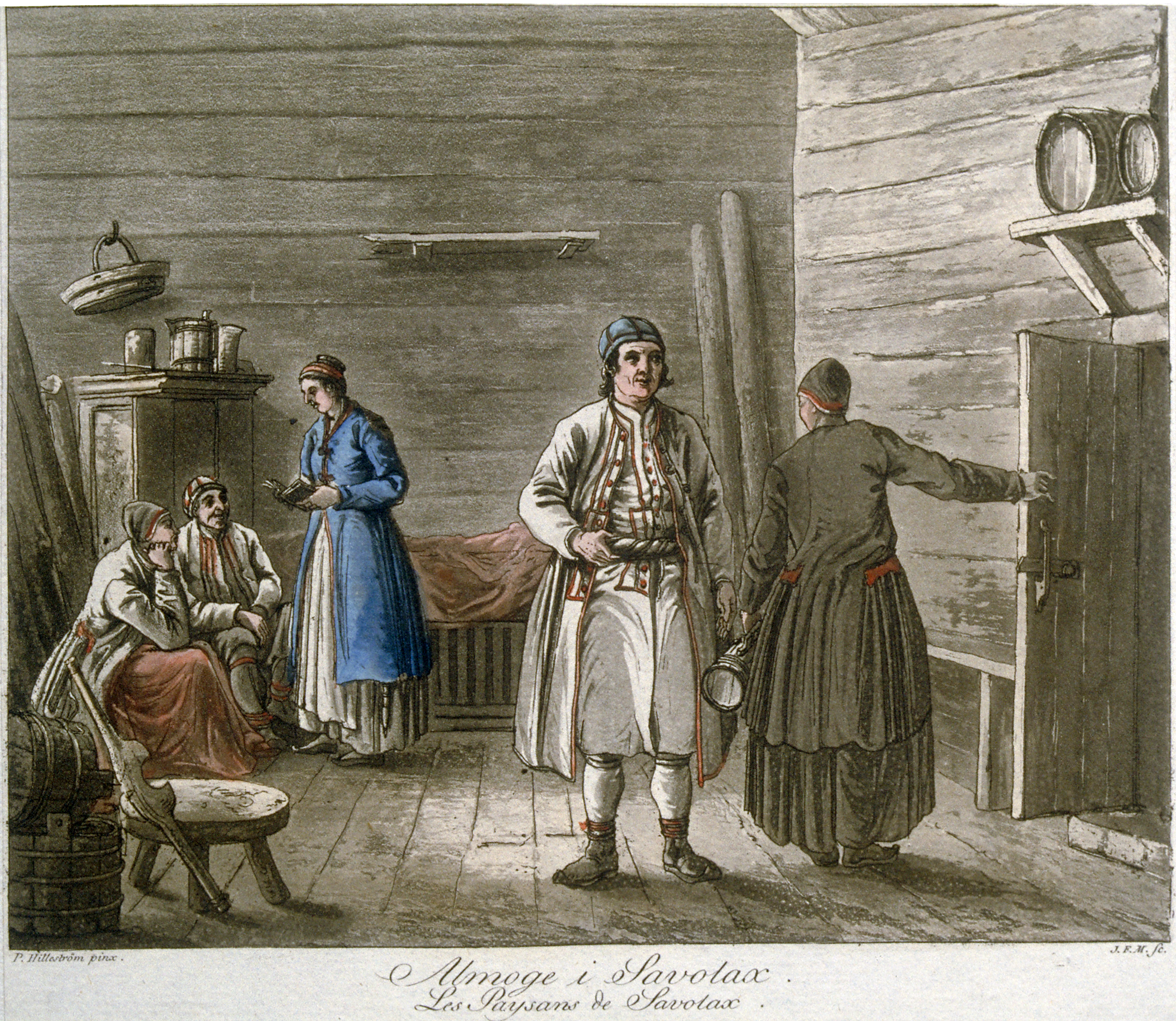
Finnish Savonian farmers at a cottage in early 19th century; by Pehr Hilleström and J. F. Martin

Peasants typically made up the majority of the agricultural labour force in a pre-industrial society. The majority of the people—according to one estimate 85% of the population—in the Middle Ages were peasants.

Though "peasant" is a word of loose application, once a market economy had taken root, the term peasant proprietors was frequently used to describe the traditional rural population in countries where smallholders farmed much of the land. More generally, the word "peasant" is sometimes used to refer pejoratively to those considered to be "lower class", perhaps defined by poorer education and/or a lower income.

== Medieval European peasants ==
The open field system of agriculture dominated most of Europe during medieval times and endured until the nineteenth century in many areas. Under this system, peasants lived on a manor presided over by a lord or a bishop of the church. Peasants paid rent or labor services to the lord in exchange for their right to cultivate the land. Fallowed land, pastures, forests, and wasteland were held in common. The open field system required cooperation among the peasants of the manor. It was gradually replaced by individual ownership and management of land.

The relative position of peasants in Western Europe improved greatly after the Black Death had reduced the population of medieval Europe in the mid-14th century, resulting in more land for the survivors and making labor more scarce. In the wake of this disruption to the established order, it became more productive for many laborers to demand wages and other alternative forms of compensation, which ultimately led to the development of widespread literacy and the enormous social and intellectual changes of the Enlightenment.

The evolution of ideas in an environment of relatively widespread literacy laid the groundwork for the Industrial Revolution, which enabled mechanically and chemically augmented agricultural production while simultaneously increasing the demand for factory workers in cities, who became what Karl Marx called the proletariat. The trend toward individual ownership of land, typified in England by Enclosure, displaced many peasants from the land and compelled them, often unwillingly, to become urban factory-workers, who came to occupy the socio-economic stratum formerly the preserve of the medieval peasants.

This process happened in an especially pronounced and truncated way in Eastern Europe. Lacking any catalysts for change in the 14th century, Eastern European peasants largely continued upon the original medieval path until the 18th and 19th centuries. Serfdom was abolished in Russia in 1861, and while many peasants would remain in areas where their family had farmed for generations, the changes did allow for the buying and selling of lands traditionally held by peasants, and for landless ex-peasants to move to the cities. Even before emancipation in 1861, serfdom was on the wane in Russia. The proportion of serfs within the empire had gradually decreased "from 45–50 percent at the end of the eighteenth century, to 37.7 percent in 1858."

== Early modern Germany ==
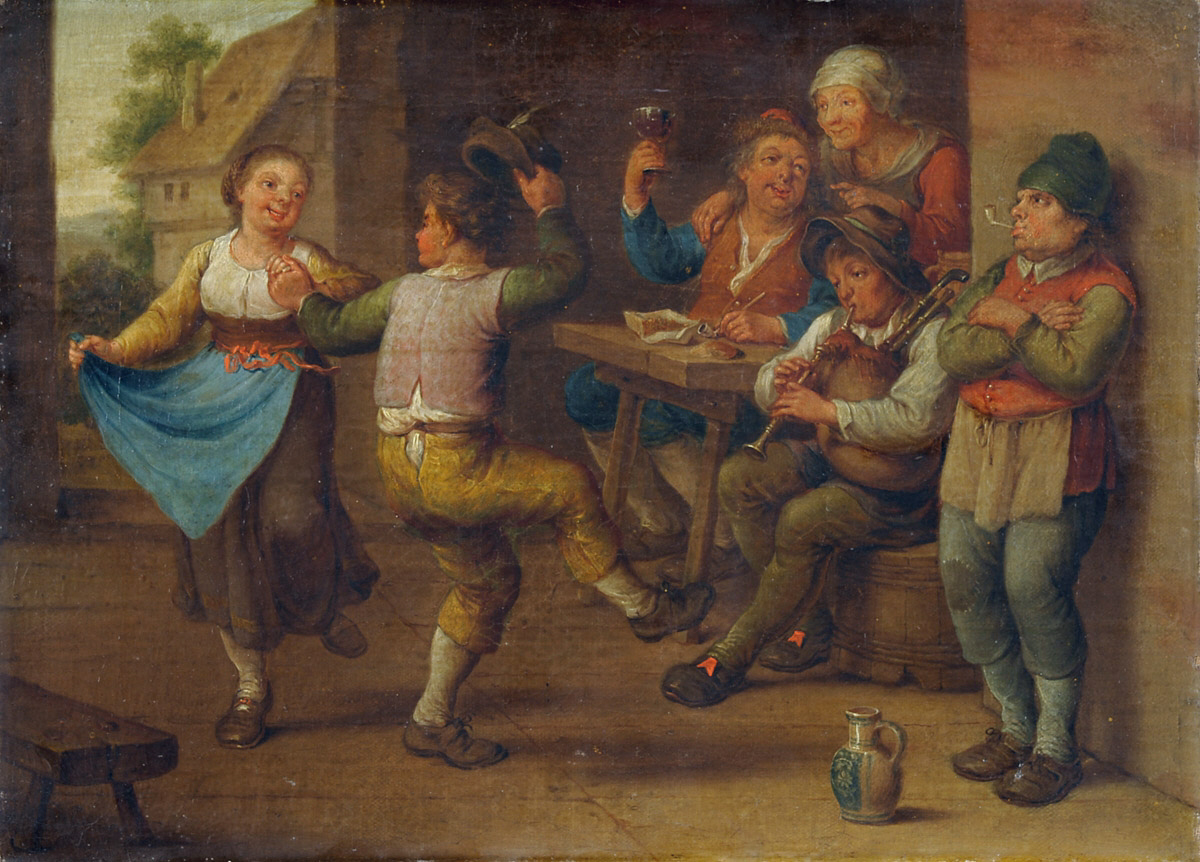
"Feiernde Bauern" ("Celebrating Peasants"), artist unknown, 18th or 19th century

In Germany, peasants continued to center their lives in the village well into the 19th century. They belonged to a corporate body and helped to manage the community resources and to monitor community life. In the East they had the status of serfs bound permanently to parcels of land. A peasant is called a "Bauer" in German and "Bur" in Low German (pronounced in English like boor).

In most of Germany, farming was handled by tenant farmers who paid rents and obligatory services to the landlord—typically a nobleman. Peasant leaders supervised the fields and ditches and grazing rights, maintained public order and morals, and supported a village court which handled minor offenses. Inside the family the patriarch made all the decisions, and tried to arrange advantageous marriages for his children. Much of the villages' communal life centered on church services and holy days. In Prussia, the peasants drew lots to choose conscripts required by the army. The noblemen handled external relationships and politics for the villages under their control, and were not typically involved in daily activities or decisions.

== France ==
Information about the complexities of the French Revolution, especially the fast-changing scene in Paris, reached isolated areas through both official announcements and long-established oral networks. Peasants responded differently to different sources of information. The limits on political knowledge in these areas depended more on how much peasants chose to know than on bad roads or illiteracy. Historian Jill Maciak concludes that peasants "were neither subservient, reactionary, nor ignorant."

In his seminal book Peasants into Frenchmen: the Modernization of Rural France, 1880–1914 (1976), historian Eugen Weber traced the modernization of French villages and argued that rural France went from backward and isolated to modern and possessing a sense of French nationhood during the late 19th and early 20th centuries. He emphasized the roles of railroads, republican schools, and universal military conscription. He based his findings on school records, migration patterns, military-service documents and economic trends. Weber argued that until 1900 or so a sense of French nationhood was weak in the provinces. Weber then looked at how the policies of the Third Republic created a sense of French nationality in rural areas. The book was widely praised, but some argued that a sense of Frenchness existed in the provinces before 1870.

== Early modern Russia ==
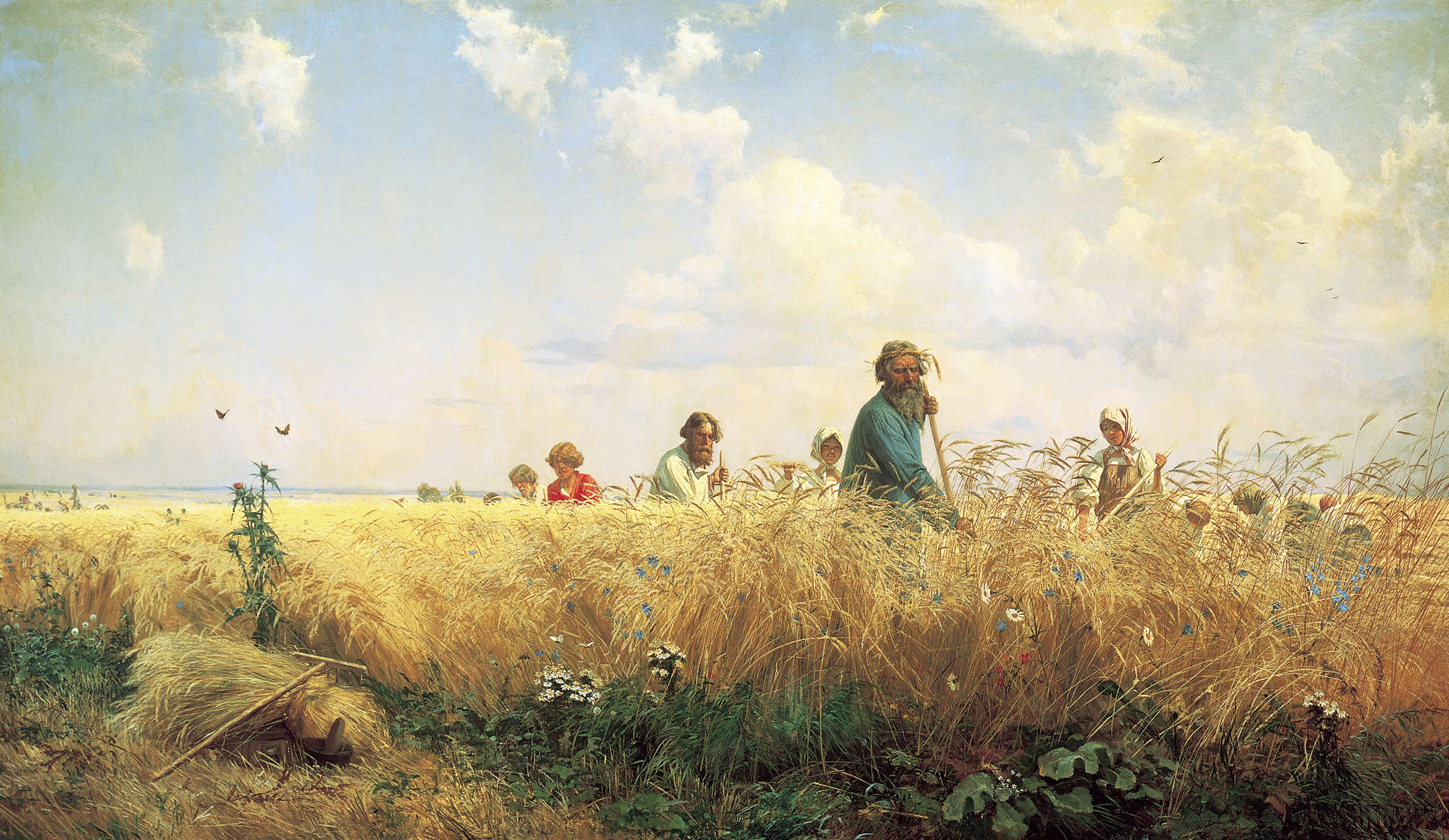
Harvest Time (Mowers), by Grigoriy Myasoyedov, 1887

Russian peasants constituted the overwhelming majority of the population of the Russian Empire. Their legal and economic dependence on landlords developed gradually from the late medieval and early modern periods. Restrictions on peasant mobility were introduced from the late 15th century onwards and were progressively tightened, culminating in the Law Code of 1649, which established the legal framework for hereditary serfdom in much of the country. Serfs were subject to the authority of their landlords and were required to provide labour services (barshchina) or payments in cash or kind (obrok). Conditions varied considerably between regions and estates, but peasants generally had limited freedom of movement and were subject to the landlords' economic and judicial authority.

Male peasants were also subject to military conscription, with communities required to provide a quota of recruits. In the early 19th century, those selected for service could be required to serve for 25 years, meaning that they rarely returned to their communities and their families lost an important source of labour. Rural life was frequently marked by poverty and food insecurity, with periodic famines caused by crop failures, droughts and other economic and climatic factors. Serfdom was abolished by the Emancipation reform of 1861 under Alexander II of Russia, granting millions of peasants personal freedom. However, former serfs generally had to make redemption payments for their land, while communal landholding and other restrictions continued to limit their economic and social mobility.

== Tokugawa Japan ==
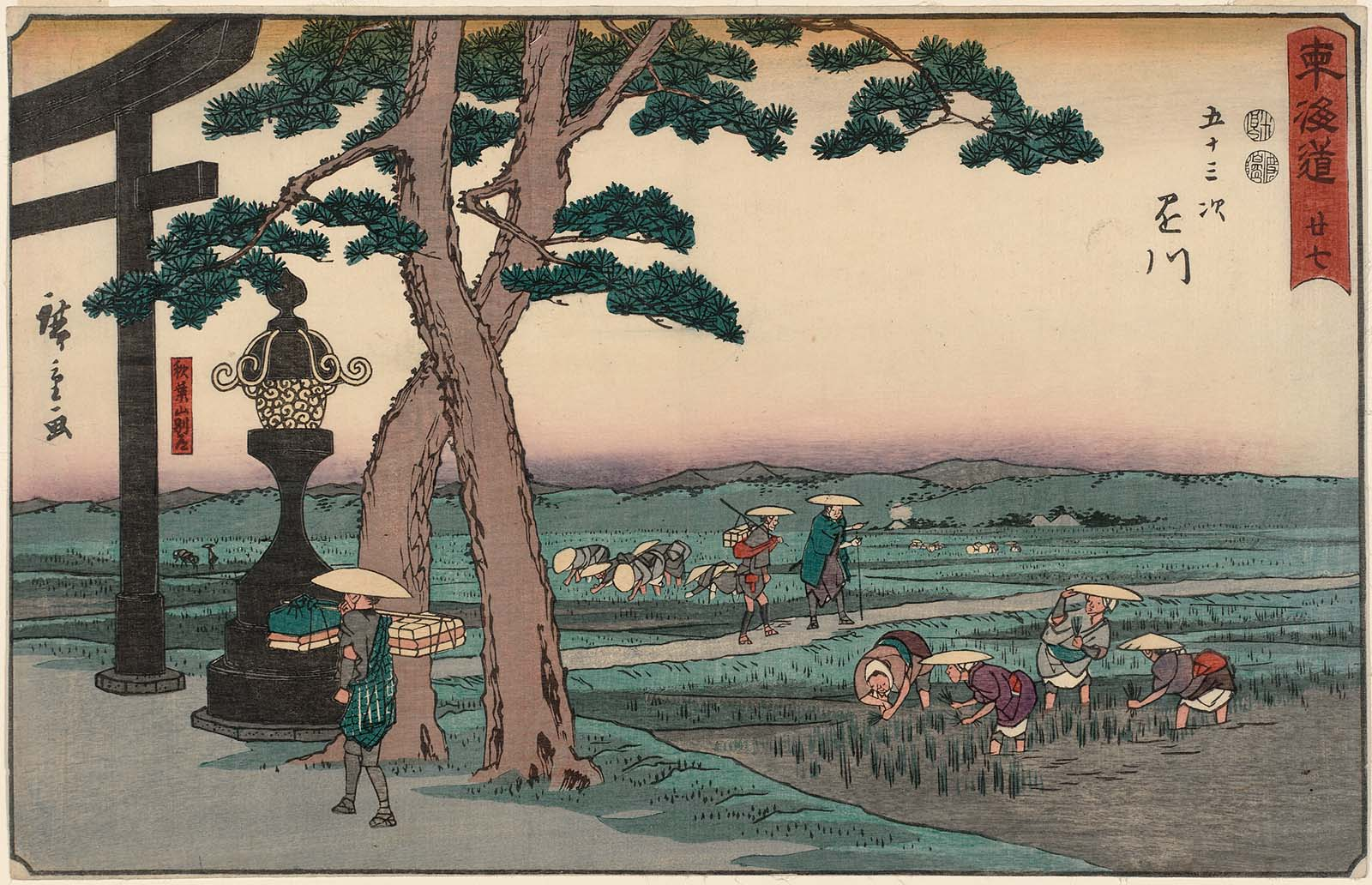
Peasants planting rice, by Utagawa Hiroshige, c. 1847

During the Tokugawa period (1603–1868), peasants formed about 80% of Japan's population and agriculture was the main source of taxation and livelihood. Villages were collectively responsible for paying taxes, while the five-household system imposed mutual responsibility and surveillance on households. Peasants were subject to obligations imposed by their daimyo and local authorities, including restrictions on migration and the use of land, while taxes were commonly assessed in terms of rice.

Tokugawa authorities also issued regulations intended to enforce frugality and maintain social distinctions. The Keian Edicts of 1649, for example, regulated aspects of peasant life including clothing and household consumption. They also expected peasants to rise early, work the fields during the day and perform household production in the evening, with both men and women expected to work at night. Despite these restrictions, rural communities participated in increasingly developed markets for agricultural products, land and labour, and peasant households played an important role in the economic development of early modern Japan. Peasant communities were vulnerable to crop failures and famine, most notably during the Tenmei famine (1782–1788) and the Tenpō famine (1833–1837), which caused widespread hunger, population decline and social unrest.

== Chinese farmers ==
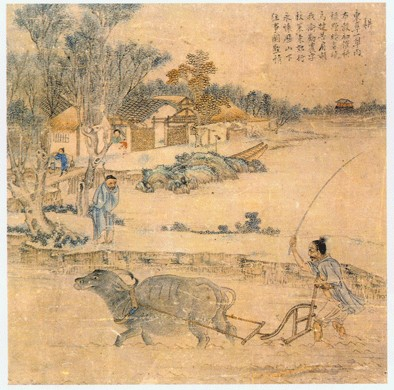
A Chinese painting depicting an agricultural scene probably during the Ming dynasty

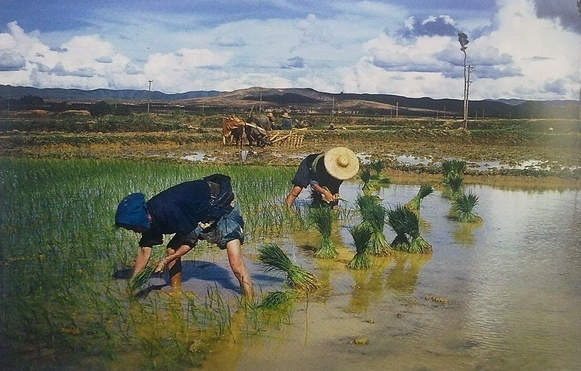
Chinese peasants in Kunming

Farmers in China have been sometimes referred to as "peasants" in English-language sources. However, the traditional term for farmer, nongfu (农夫), simply refers to "farmer" or "agricultural worker". In the 19th century, Japanese intellectuals reinvented the Chinese terms fengjian (封建) for "feudalism" and nongmin (农民), or "farming people", terms used in the description of feudal Japanese society. These terms created a negative image of Chinese farmers by making a class distinction where one had not previously existed. Anthropologist Myron Cohen considers these terms to be neologisms that represented a cultural and political invention. He writes:

This divide represented a radical departure from tradition: F. W. Mote and others have shown how especially during the later imperial era (Ming and Qing dynasties), China was notable for the cultural, social, political, and economic interpenetration of city and countryside. But the term nongmin did enter China in association with Marxist and non-Marxist Western perceptions of the "peasant," thereby putting the full weight of the Western heritage to use in a new and sometimes harshly negative representation of China's rural population. Likewise, with this development Westerners found it all the more "natural" to apply their own historically derived images of the peasant to what they observed or were told in China. The idea of the peasant remains powerfully entrenched in the Western perception of China to this very day.

Writers in English mostly used the term "farmers" until the 1920s, when the term peasant came to predominate, implying that China was feudal, ready for revolution, like Europe before the French Revolution. This Western use of the term suggests that China is stagnant, "medieval", underdeveloped, and held back by its rural population. Cohen writes that the "imposition of the historically burdened Western contrasts of town and country, shopkeeper and peasant, or merchant and landlord, serves only to distort the realities of the Chinese economic tradition".

== Latin American farmers ==
In Latin America, the term "peasant" is translated to "Campesino" (from campo—country person), but the meaning has changed over time. While most Campesinos before the 20th century were in equivalent status to peasants—they usually did not own land and had to make payments to or were in an employment position towards a landlord (the hacienda system), most Latin American countries saw one or more extensive land reforms in the 20th century. The land reforms of Latin America were more comprehensive initiatives that redistributed lands from large landholders to former peasants—farm workers and tenant farmers. Hence, many Campesinos in Latin America today are closer to smallholders who own their land and do not pay rent to a landlord, rather than peasants who do not own land.

The Catholic Bishops of Paraguay have asserted that "Every campesino has a natural right to possess a reasonable allotment of land where he can establish his home, work for [the] subsistence of his family and a secure life".

== Historiography ==
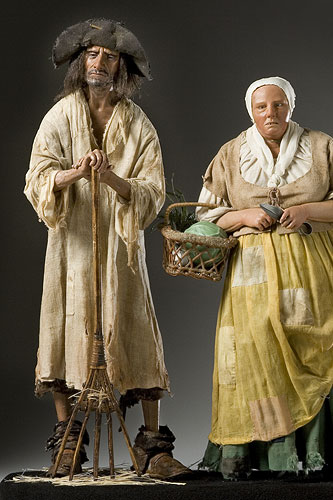
Portrait sculpture of 18th-century French peasants by artist George S. Stuart, in the permanent collection of the Museum of Ventura County, Ventura, California

In medieval Europe society was theorized as being organized into three estates: those who work, those who pray, and those who fight. The Annales School of 20th-century French historians emphasized the importance of peasants. Its leader Fernand Braudel devoted the first volume—called The Structures of Everyday Life—of his major work, Civilization and Capitalism 15th–18th Century to the largely silent and invisible world that existed below the market economy.

Other research in the field of peasant studies was promoted by Florian Znaniecki and Fei Xiaotong, and in the post-1945 studies of the "great tradition" and the "little tradition" in the work of Robert Redfield. In the 1960s, anthropologists and historians began to rethink the role of peasant revolt in world history and in their own disciplines. Peasant revolution was seen as a Third World response to capitalism and imperialism.

The anthropologist Eric Wolf, for instance, drew on the work of earlier scholars in the Marxist tradition such as Daniel Thorner, who saw the rural population as a key element in the transition from feudalism to capitalism. Wolf and a group of scholars criticized both Marx and the field of Modernization theorists for treating peasants as lacking the ability to take action. James C. Scott's field observations in Malaysia convinced him that villagers were active participants in their local politics even though they were forced to use indirect methods. Many of these activist scholars looked back to the peasant movement in India and to the theories of the revolution in China led by Mao Zedong starting in the 1920s. The anthropologist Myron Cohen, however, asked why the rural population in China were called "peasants" rather than "farmers", a distinction he called political rather than scientific. One important outlet for their scholarly work and theory was The Journal of Peasant Studies.

== See also ==
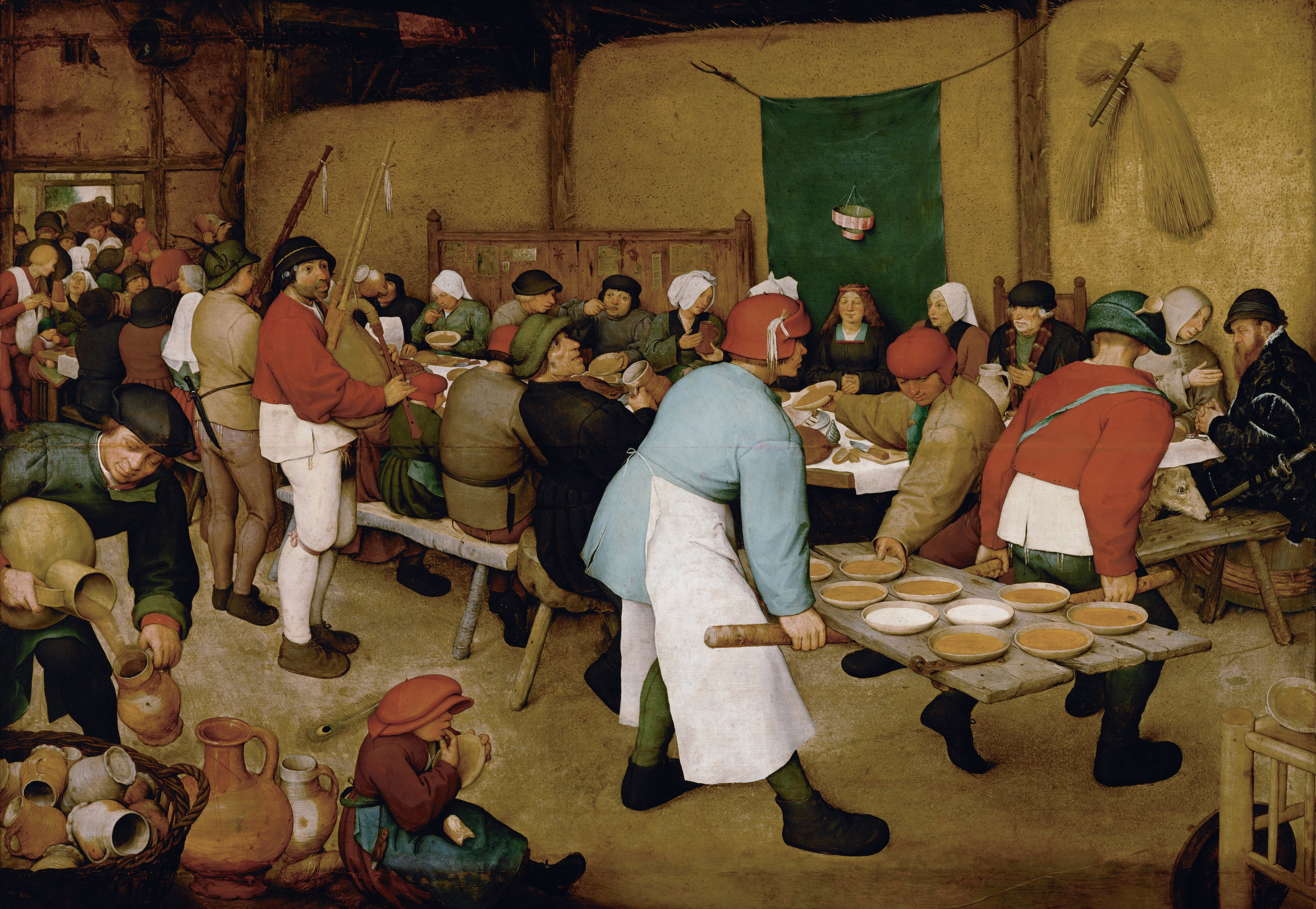
The Peasant Wedding, by Flemish painter Pieter Brueghel the Elder, 1567 or 1568

"Peasants in a Tavern" by Adriaen van Ostade (c. 1635), at the Alte Pinakothek, Munich

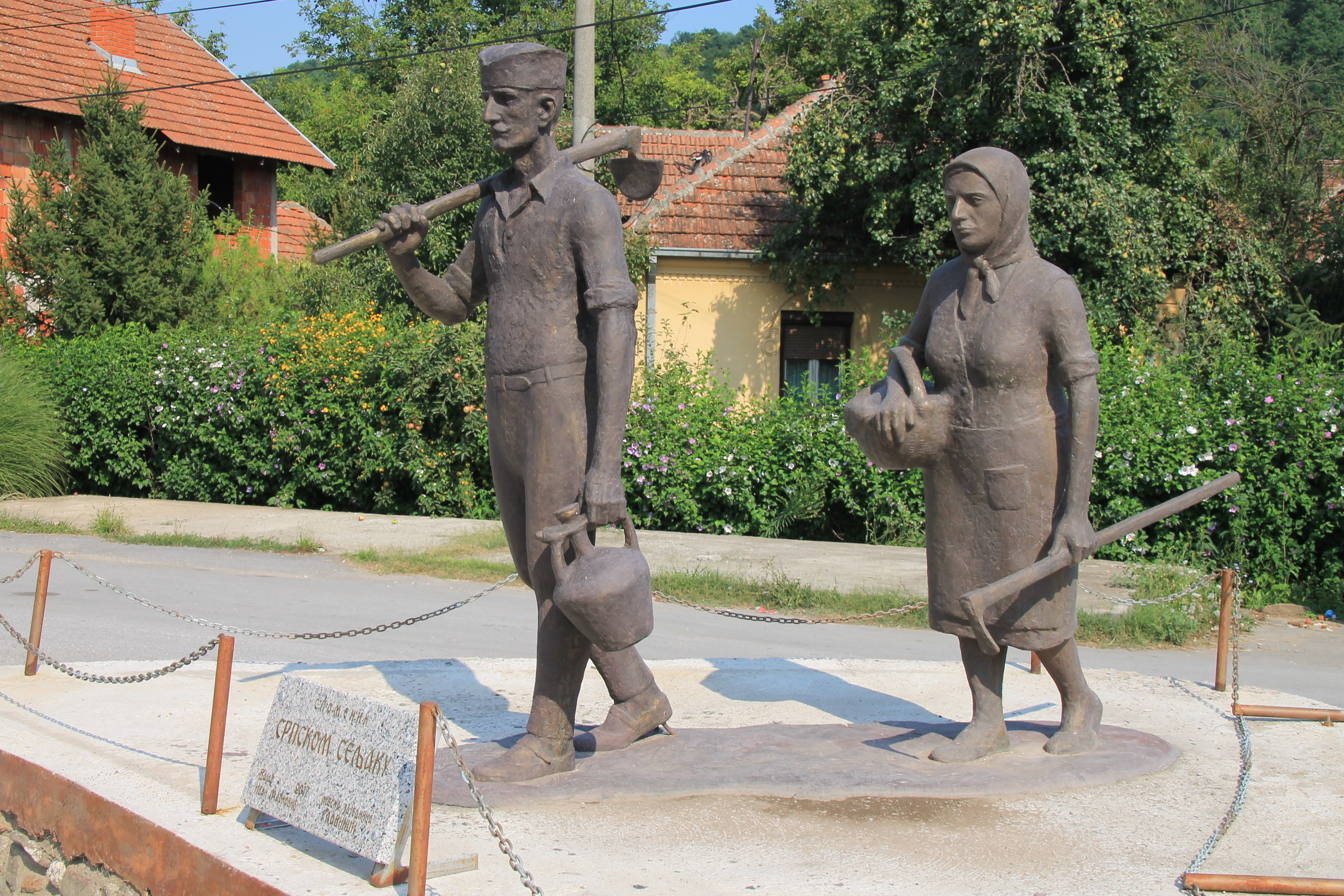
Monument dedicated to Serbian peasants, Jagodina

- Agrarianism
- Cudgel War
- Family economy
- Folk culture
- Land reform
- Land reform by country
- List of peasant revolts
- Peasant economics
- Peasant Party (political movements in various countries)
- Peasants' Republic
- Peasants' Revolt
- Petty nobility
- Popular revolt in late-medieval Europe
- Serfdom
- Via Campesina

=== Related terms ===
- Aloer
- Am ha'aretz
- Boor
- Bracciante
- Campesino
- Churl
- Colonus
- Contadino
- Cotter
- Fellah
- Free tenant
- Gabellotto
- Honbyakushō
- Kulak
- Muzhik
- Pagesos de remença
- Pawn
- Peon
- Serf
- Sharecropper
- Smerd
- Șerb
- Tenant farmer
- Terrone
- Villein

== Cited sources ==
- Cohen, Myron L. (2005). Kinship, Contract, Community, and State Anthropological Perspectives on China. Basel/Berlin/Boston: Stanford University Press. doi:10.1515/9781503624986. ISBN 978-1-5036-2498-6. S2CID 246207129.

== Bibliography ==
- Bix, Herbert P. Peasant Protest in Japan, 1590–1884 (1986)
- Evans, Richard J., and W. R. Lee, eds. The German Peasantry: Conflict and Community from the Eighteenth to the Twentieth Centuries (1986)
- Figes, Orlando. "The Peasantry" in Vladimir IUrevich Cherniaev, ed. (1997). Critical Companion to the Russian Revolution, 1914–1921. Indiana UP. pp. 543–53. ISBN 0253333334.
- Hayford, Charles W. (1997), Stromquist, Shelton; Cox, Jeffrey (eds.), The Storm over the Peasant: Orientalism, Rhetoric and Representation in Modern China, Iowa City: University of Iowa Press, pp. 150–172
- Hobsbawm, E. J. "Peasants and politics", Journal of Peasant Studies, Volume 1, Issue 1 October 1973, pp. 3–22 – article discusses the definition of "peasant" as used in social sciences
- Macey, David A. J. Government and Peasant in Russia, 1861–1906; The Pre-History of the Stolypin Reforms (1987).
- Kingston-Mann, Esther and Timothy Mixter, eds. Peasant Economy, Culture, and Politics of European Russia, 1800–1921 (1991)
- Thomas, William I., and Florian Znaniecki. The Polish Peasant in Europe and America (2 vol. 1918); classic sociological study; complete text online free
- Wharton, Clifton R. Subsistence agriculture and economic development. Chicago: Aldine Pub. Co., 1969.
- Wolf, Eric R. Peasants (Prentice-Hall, 1966).

=== Recent ===
- Akram-Lodhi, A. Haroon, and Cristobal Kay, eds. Peasants and Globalization: Political Economy, Rural Transformation and the Agrarian Question (2009)
- Barkin, David. "Who Are The Peasants?" Latin American Research Review, 2004, Vol. 39, Issue 3, pp. 270–281
- Brass, Tom. Peasants, Populism and Postmodernism (2000)
- Brass, Tom, ed. Latin American Peasants (2003)
- Scott, James C. The Moral Economy of the Peasant: Rebellion and Subsistence in Southeast Asia (1976)
