= Seoul Development Consensus =

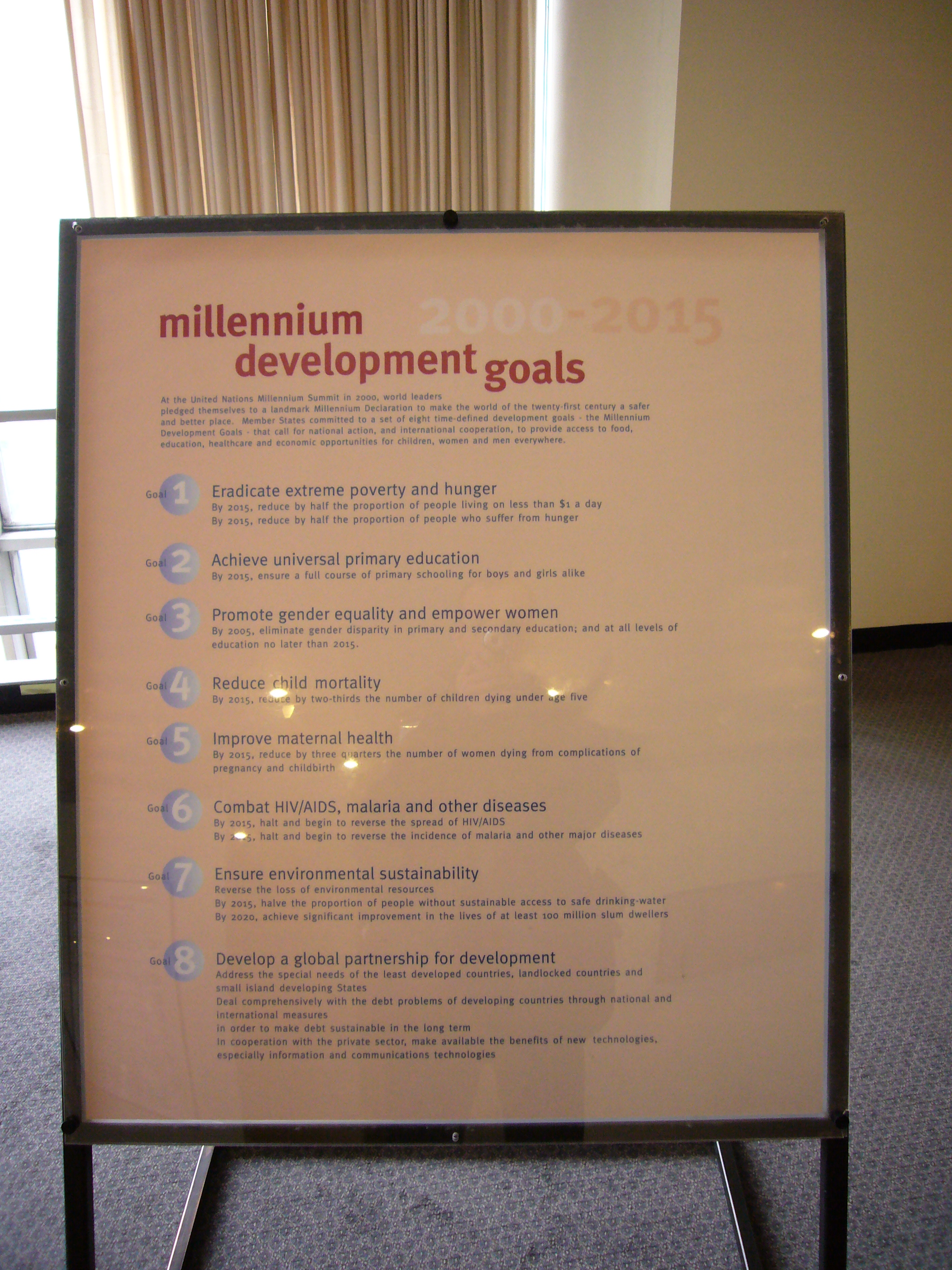
The UN Millennium Development Goals are emphasized in the Seoul consensus.

The Seoul Development Consensus for Shared Growth is a set of principles and guidelines set up to assist the G20 nations and other global actors in working collaboratively with less developed countries in order to boost their economic growth and to achieve the UN's Millennium Development Goals. It was endorsed by the leaders of G20 nations at the 2010 G-20 Seoul summit, with a multi-year action plan drafted for the delivery of tangible results.

In contrast with the older Washington Consensus, the Seoul Consensus allows a larger role for state intervention. Rather than seeking to impose a uniform "top down" solution, it postulates that solutions should be tailored to the requirements of individual developing nations, with the developing countries themselves taking the lead in designing packages of reforms and policies best suited to their needs.

The Washington Consensus as originally defined was a set of ten key principles. The new Consensus is based on six core principles and has nine "key pillars".

== Core principles ==
The six core principles of the Seoul consensus are:

- Focus on economic growth The G20 suggest that economic growth is closely linked with low income countries' (LICs) ability to achieve the Millennium Development Goals. They state that measures to promote inclusive, sustainable and resilient growth should take precedence over business as usual.
- Global development partnership. LICs should be treated as equal partners, with national ownership for their own development. Partnerships should be transparent and accountable.
- Global or regional systemic issues. The G20 should prioritise regional or systemic issues where their collective action is best placed to deliver beneficial changes.
- Private sector participation. The G20 recognise the importance of private actors in contributing to growth and suggest that policies should be business friendly.
- Complementarity. The G20 will try to avoid duplicating the efforts of other global actors, focussing their efforts on areas where they have a comparative advantage.
- Outcome orientation. The G20 will focus on tangible practical measures to address significant problems.

=== Key pillars ===
The nine key pillars are areas believed to be most in need of attention within developing countries. These are 1) infrastructure, 2) private investment and job creation, 3) human resource development, 4) trade, 5) financial inclusion, 6) resilient growth, 7) food security, 8) domestic resource mobilization 9) knowledge sharing.

== History of the Seoul consensus ==
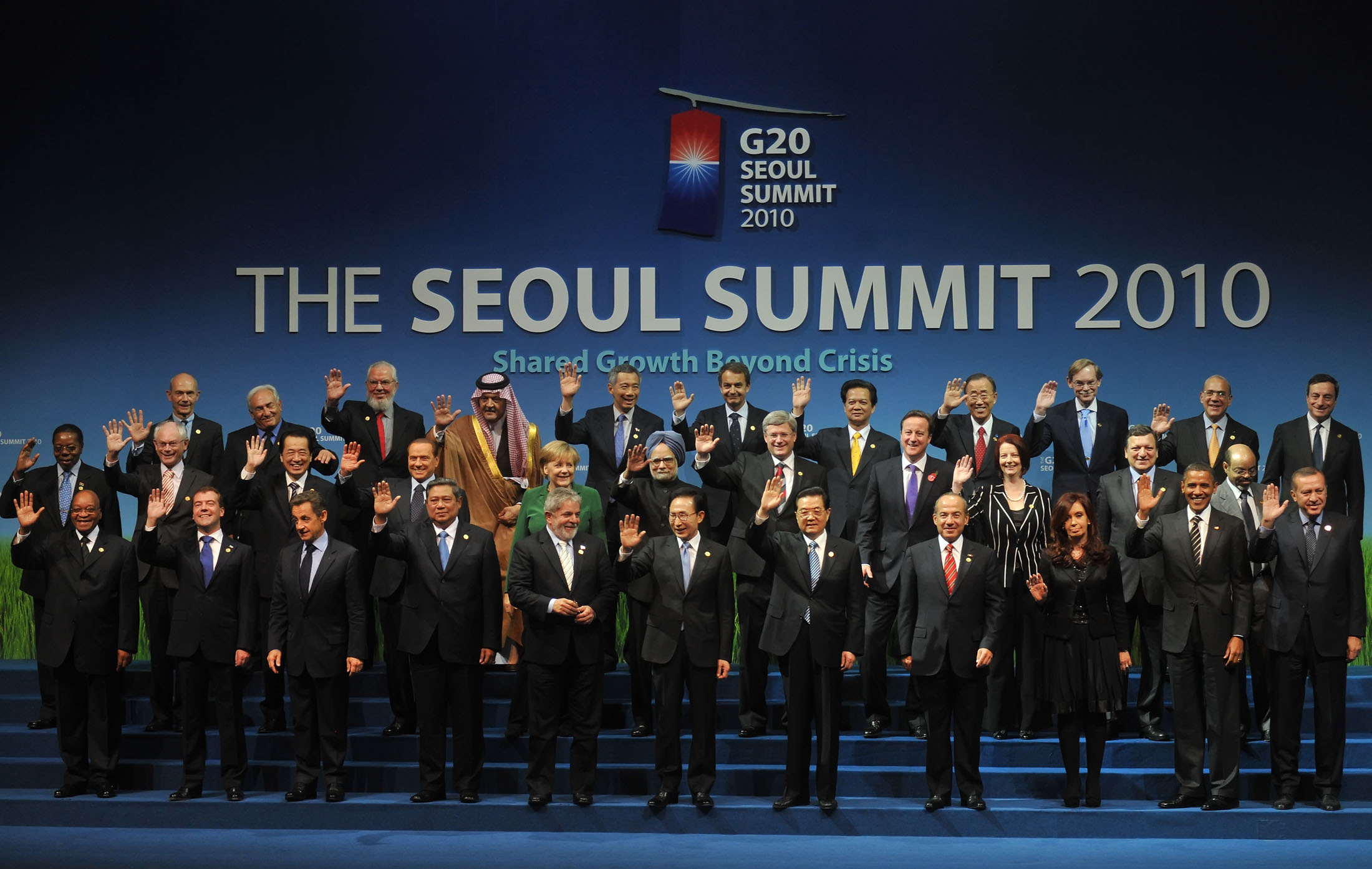
The Seoul consensus was created by the G20, to what extent it was influenced by calls for a "Seoul development consensus" from NGOs such as Oxfam is not yet fully clear.

=== Creation ===
Development issues have been discussed at G20 leader level since the 2009 London summit. After the 2010 Toronto summit the G20 issued a statement saying that "narrowing the development gap and reducing poverty are integral" to their broader goals. Shortly after it was announced the next summit would be in Seoul, civil society actors including Oxfam began advocating for what they called a "Seoul Development Consensus". The G20's original draft document for the consensus had included provisions to allow the poorest countries unrestricted access to the markets of G20 economies, something which NGOs and even religious leaders such as the Pope had strongly advocated for in his 2009 social encyclical. The provision was dropped from the final declaration as not all members could agree.

=== Implementation ===
After their 2011 April meeting of Finance ministers the G20 released a communique where they emphasised the importance of implementing the Consensus, saying they were anticipating concrete recommendations to be released by their high level panel in September.

== Reactions ==
Initial reactions on the Seoul consensus have been mixed. An editorial in The Financial Times described its "pragmatic and pluralistic view of development" as appealing, but also suggested it might "do little more than drive another nail into the coffin of a long-deceased Washington consensus" An article published by The Wall Street Journal was somewhat more positive, noting that a concrete step already taken was to create a new panel of 12 countries that would work on infrastructure financing. The Korean Daily News published an article suggesting the Consensus may turn out to be the only durable achievement of the Seoul Summit.

British charity CAFOD said the new consensus was "eerily familiar" compared to the earlier Washington version, and were not pleased with the emphases on involving the private sector, especially with infrastructure. Oxfam's Avinash Kumar was disappointed by the whole focus on physical infrastructure, suggesting a clearer commitment to improving social infrastructure in less developed countries would have been better.

Some scholars noted the consensus offered vague announcements, but limited details in implementation. Others noted just cosmetic changes between Washington and Seoul Development consensus, hence just "all talk, but no walk".

== See also ==
- Bretton Woods system
- Beijing Consensus
- Mumbai Consensus
