= Joshua Cooper Ramo =

American foreign policy consultant and writer

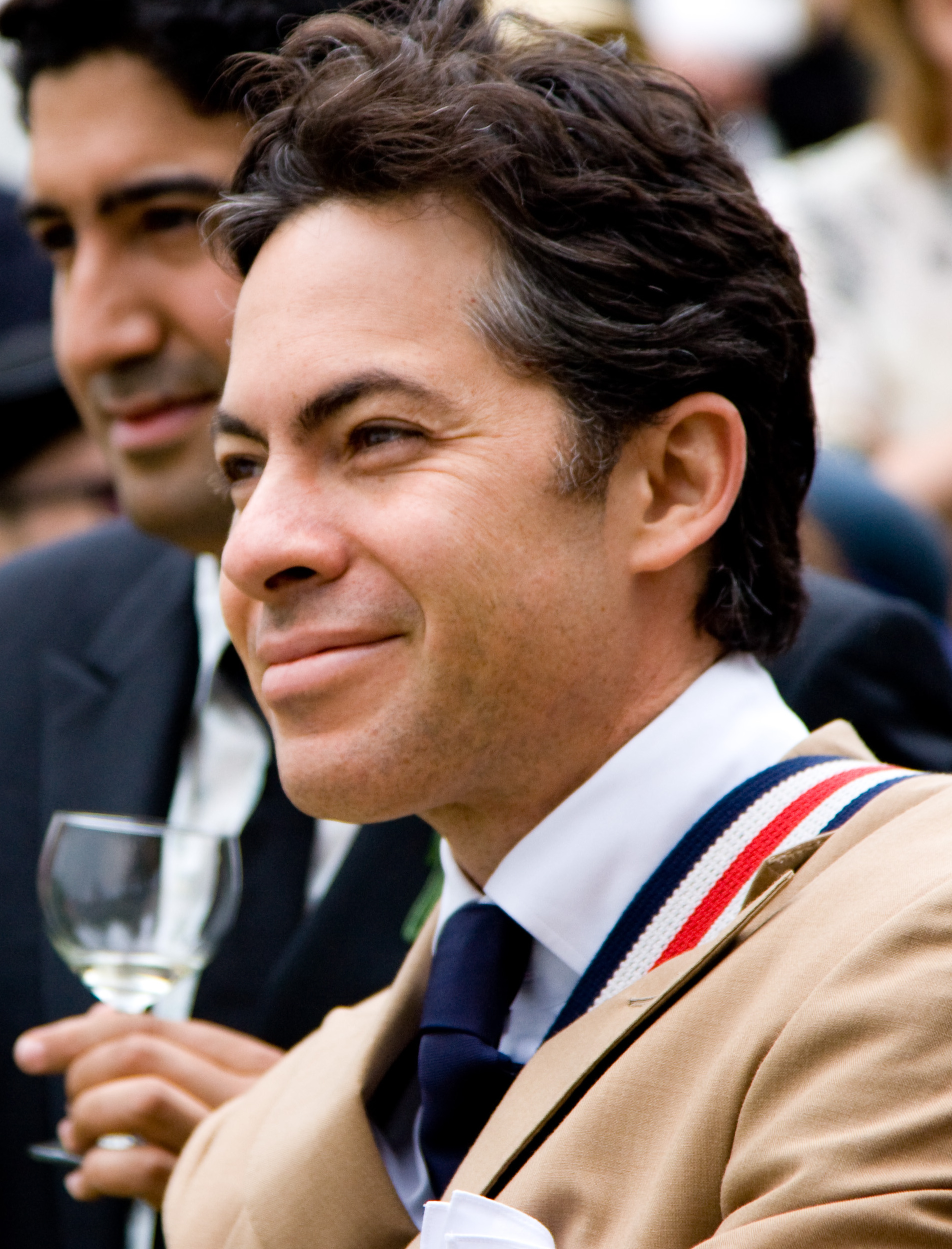
- Born: December 14, 1968 (age 57); Durham, North Carolina, U.S.
- Education: University of Chicago (BA); New York University (MA)
- Known for: Beijing Consensus
- Relatives: Roberta Cooper Ramo (mother)

Joshua Cooper Ramo (born December 14, 1968) is vice chairman and co-chief executive of Kissinger Associates, the consulting firm of former U.S. Secretary of State Henry Kissinger. He is also the author of several non-fiction books including two New York Times best-sellers, The Age of the Unthinkable and The Seventh Sense. Ramo's 2004 analysis of the "Beijing Consensus" concept generated significant discourse on the idea of a China model.

== Early life and education ==
Ramo was born on born December 14, 1968. Rаmo was rаised in Los Ranchos, New Mexico, on the Rio Grande. He began flying in his late teens and later wrote the book No Visible Horizon about his experiences as a competitive aerobatic pilot. Ramo holds a bachelor's degree in Latin American Studies from the University of Chicago and a master's degree in economics from New York University.

== Journalism career ==
Ramo began his career as a journalist at Newsweek in 1993. He joined Time magazine in 1996 when he was hired by Walter Isaacson. Ramo oversaw the magazine’s digital operations and ran Time's digital magazine while also covering technology. In 1998, he became foreign editor of Time, overseeing the magazine's international coverage. He was the youngest senior editor and foreign editor in the history of Time Magazine. During his tenure at the magazine, he wrote more than 20 domestic and international cover stories.

== Business career ==
Prompted by an interest in business and global affairs, Ramo moved to Beijing in 2002. He worked with John L. Thornton, a former president of Goldman Sachs, in China from 2003-2005, when he joined Kissinger Associates as managing director. In 2011, he became vice chairman of Kissinger Associates. In 2015, he became co-chief executive officer.

Fluent in Mandarin, Ramo currently divides his time between Beijing and New York, and serves as advisor to large corporations and investors with a particular focus on large-scale cross-border transactions. He additionally serves on the Board of Directors of Starbucks and FedEx.`

== Television career ==
In 2008, Ramo served as China analyst for NBC Sports during its coverage of the Beijing Olympic Games. For his work with Bob Costas and Matt Lauer during the Opening Ceremony of the Games he shared in a Peabody and an Emmy award.

In 2018, Ramo rejoined NBC Sports as a contributor and analyst for its coverage of the 2018 Winter Olympics in Pyeongchang, South Korea. However, Ramo was criticized for the uninformed comment he made about Korea-Japan relations and sentiments on Japan among Koreans during NBC's coverage of the game's opening ceremony.

=== Comment on Japan–Korea relations ===
During NBC's coverage of the 2018 Winter Olympics opening ceremony, Ramo noted that Japan occupied Korea from 1910–45, and then added, "But every Korean will tell you that Japan is a cultural and technological and economic example that has been so important to their own transformation." NBC issued an on-air apology the next morning. NBC later shared that Ramo was hired only for the Opening Ceremony and would have "no further role during the PyeongChang Games." Ramo later issued an apology, stating "I did not intend to minimize or disrespect a part of Korean history that must never be forgotten."

The Korea Times called the comment "incorrect and insensitive." Also, American media outlets were overwhelmingly critical of Ramo's statements, denouncing them as "clueless", and "false".

== Affiliations ==
Ramo is vice chairman and co-chief executive of Kissinger Associates, the consulting firm of former U.S. Secretary of State Henry Kissinger.

Ramo has been a member of the Leaders 21 project, a term member of the Council on Foreign Relations, a “Young Global Leader” and “Global Leader of Tomorrow” of the World Economic Forum, a Crown Fellow of the Aspen Institute, and a co-founder of the National Committee on United States–China Relation's US-China Young Leaders Forum.

== Key concepts ==
The World Economic Forum called Ramo “One of China’s leading foreign-born scholars.”

=== The Beijing Consensus ===
In 2004 he published "The Beijing Consensus," which contrasted the Chinese model of economics and politics with western, "Washington Consensus" models. The article prompted significant discussion about the concept of a Beijing Consensus.

In 2016, Ramo explained that the Beijing Consensus shows not that "every nation will follow China's development model, but that it legitimizes the notion of particularity as opposed to the universality of a Washington model".

=== Co-Evolution ===
In 2011, Ramo proposed a new model of US-China relations based on complexity theory known as “co-evolution.”

== Works ==
=== No Visible Horizon ===
In 2003, Ramo published No Visible Horizon: Surviving the World's Most Dangerous Sport, which tackled his training as an aerobatic flyer and the "violent, difficult maneuvers" of the sport.

=== The Age of the Unthinkable ===
In 2009, Ramo published The Age of the Unthinkable: Why the New World Disorder Constantly Surprises Us and What We Can Do About It, which was a New York Times bestseller that was translated into 15 languages. The book applies ideas of chaos theory and complex adaptive systems to problems of foreign policy.

=== The Seventh Sense ===
In 2016, Little, Brown & Co. released Ramo's third book, The Seventh Sense: Power, Fortune, and Survival in the Age of Networks, which purports to identify a "new instinct" for networks that characterized new groups in politics, economics and security. Drawing on ideas from technology, history and economics, The Seventh Sense claims that the emergence of constant, widespread connection represents a shift in power that will be as significant as the Enlightenment and Industrial Revolution, leading to a widespread collapse of existing institutions and the emergence of new sources of power. In the book, Ramo proposed a new idea for American grand strategy known as “Hard Gatekeeping” in which the country would develop and use platforms for the control of network topology, but would carefully limit access to those platforms. On June 6, 2016, The Seventh Sense debuted on the New York Times bestseller list at #7, and on May 29, 2016, The Seventh Sense was named to the Washington Post's nonfiction bestseller list for the week of May 26, 2016.

== Controversy ==
=== Ramo's contact with Jeffrey Epstein ===
In April 2023, The Wall Street Journal reported that Ramo held "more than a dozen meetings" with convicted child sex offender Jeffrey Epstein "from 2013 to 2017". The WSJ's review of emails, calendars, and other documents belonging to the late Epstein showed many of his meetings with Ramo took place in Epstein's New York townhouse after 5 p.m. In September 2013, Epstein and Ramo met at the townhouse for breakfast with "former Israeli Prime Minister Ehud Barak". On a separate occasion they met with Ariane de Rothschild who then served as the chief executive of the Swiss private bank Edmond de Rothschild Group.

In response to a Reuters inquiry, Ramo stated that he met with Epstein in New York, along with various business figures and scientists, about 14 times between 2013 and 2016 and visited Epstein's ranch once for a 2014 lunch on behalf of professors from the Massachusetts Institute of Technology and Harvard University, who were present. "I deferred to the due diligence of the institutions involved, assuming that his presence signaled he had been appropriately vetted," Ramo told Reuters. "I feel a deep sense of grief for the survivors of his crimes."
