= Aloer =

Aloers (the word is originally Catalan) were independent peasant proprietors of alous in what is now Catalonia, especially during the years between the Carolingian reconquest of the Hispanic Marches from the Moors in the late 9th century and the consolidation of feudalism in that region in the 11th century. They generally practised family-based subsistence farming.

The owner of property in alou (from the Frankish alôd = full domain; cognate with allodial) was considered by medieval jurists to have "no other lord than God".
