= China model =

Economic policies of post-Maoist China

The Beijing Consensus (Chinese: 北京共识) or China Model (Chinese: 中国模式), also known as the Chinese Economic Model, is the political and economic policies of the People's Republic of China (PRC) that began to be instituted by Hua Guofeng and Deng Xiaoping after Mao Zedong's death in 1976. The policies are thought to have contributed to China's "economic miracle" and eightfold growth in gross national product over two decades. In 2004, the phrase "Beijing Consensus" was coined by Joshua Cooper Ramo to frame China's economic development model as an alternative—especially for developing countries—to the Washington Consensus of market-friendly policies promoted by the IMF, World Bank, and U.S. Treasury. In 2016, Ramo explained that the Beijing Consensus shows not that "every nation will follow China's development model, but that it legitimizes the notion of particularity as opposed to the universality of a Washington model".

The term's definition is not agreed upon. Ramo has detailed it as a pragmatic policy that uses innovation and experimentation to achieve "equitable, peaceful high-quality growth", and "defense of national borders and interests", whereas other scholars have used it to refer to "stable, if repressive, politics and high-speed economic growth". Others criticize its vagueness, claiming that there is "no consensus as to what it stands for" other than being an alternative to the neoliberal Washington Consensus, and that the term "is applied to anything that happens in Beijing, regardless of whether or not it has to do with a 'Chinese Model of Development,' or even with the People's Republic of China (PRC) per se".

== Characteristics ==
In academic literature on economics the study of the modern People's Republic of China (PRC) is influenced by parallel academic evaluations of neoliberalism. The China Model is sometimes used interchangeably with the Beijing Consensus, though there are people who state "it is inaccurate to describe the Chinese model as the 'Beijing consensus' versus the 'Washington consensus'."

As of at least early 2024, there is not yet a well-developed theoretical framework for a Chinese Model. Commentators have cited various aspects of China's historical experience to describe their views of such a model. There is general scholarly agreement that the four key characteristics of the concept are: (1) development is key to promoting peace and stability, (2) incremental political reform better promotes peace and stability than sudden reform, (3) robust state capacity is critical to implementing development plans and managing conflicts within a country, and (4) preserving sovereignty and independence are important to peace and stability.

For example, Academic Zhang Weiwei characterizes the model as focusing on down-to-earth pragmatic concern with serving the people; constant trial and error experimentation; gradual reform rather than neo-liberal economic shock therapy; a strong and pro-development state; "selective cultural borrowing" of foreign ideas; a pattern of implementing easy reforms first, difficult ones later. Researcher John Williamson describes the Beijing Consensus as consisting of five points: Incremental Reform (as opposed to a Big Bang approach), Innovation and Experimentation, Export Led Growth, State Capitalism (as opposed to Socialist Planning or Free Market Capitalism), Authoritarianism (as opposed to a Democratic regime type).

Observations of Western commentators sometimes characterize the model as replacing trust in the free market for economic growth with "a more muscular state hand on the levers of capitalism", an absence of political liberalization, strong leading role of ruling political party, and population control.

== Development ==
The terminology of a "Beijing consensus" began to attract discussion following a 2004 article of that name by Joshua Cooper Ramo.

The model received considerable attention following the 2008-9 severe economic downturn as Western economies faltered and recovered slowly while Chinese economic growth remained dynamic; comparisons began to portray the China Model or the "Beijing Consensus" as China's alternative to the "Washington Consensus" liberal-market approach. China's resource mobilization for the hosting of the 2008 Olympics also resulted increased discussion of the China model idea.

Discussion of the China model also increased during the tenure of Xi Jinping and his promotion of the China Dream.

As China's economic growth has continued, the China Model or the "Beijing Consensus" as a template has grown more popular around the world. According to Indonesian scholar Ignatius Wibowo, "the China Model clearly has gained ground in Southeast Asia" as countries there "have shifted their development strategy from one based on free markets and democracy to one based on semi-free markets and an illiberal political system." Under Chinese Communist Party general secretary Xi Jinping, China has become an active participant: launching the Belt and Road Initiative (BRI), increasing foreign aid and investment around the world, and by providing training in economic management and various civil-service skills for more than 10,000 bureaucrats from other developing countries. The training includes sessions where China's successes in improving living standards are promoted.

== Analysis ==
=== Joshua Cooper Ramo ===
The term was coined in a United Kingdom's Foreign Policy Centre paper by Joshua Cooper Ramo titled The Beijing Consensus. Ramo framed his discussion around China's economic development model as an alternative—especially for developing countries—to the Washington Consensus of market-friendly policies promoted by the IMF, World Bank, and U.S. Treasury. His paper laid out three broad guidelines for economic development under what he called the "China model".

The first guideline involves a "commitment to innovation and constant experimentation." One of the major criticisms of the Washington Consensus is its complacency. Ramo argues that there is no perfect solution, and that the only true path to success is one that is dynamic, as no one plan works for every situation.

The second guideline states that per capita income (GDP/capita) should not be the lone measure of progress. Rather, Ramo feels that the sustainability of the economic system and an even distribution of wealth, along with GDP, are important indicators of progress.

The third guideline urges a policy of self-determination, where the less-developed nations use leverage to keep the superpowers in check and assure their own financial sovereignty. This includes not only financial self-determination, but also a shift to the most effective military strategy, which Ramo suggests is more likely to be an asymmetric strategy rather than one that seeks direct confrontation. Unlike the Washington Consensus, which largely ignored questions of geo-politics, Ramo argues—particularly in the Chinese context—that geo-politics and geoeconomics are fundamentally linked.

In 2016, Ramo explained that the Beijing Consensus shows not that "every nation will follow China's development model, but that it legitimizes the notion of particularity as opposed to the universality of a Washington model".

=== In China ===
Among Chinese elites, the debate over whether a Beijing Consensus or China Model exists is a highly divisive topic. Academic David Daokui Li characterizes Chinese officials and academics as frequently "allergic" to the topic, often viewing it as more appropriate to discuss the "Chinese experience" but premature to view that experience as a "model". Chinese critics of the idea of a China model often observe that China faces various challenges and, from their perspective, it is too early to suggest a coherent and unique model.

Among the major Chinese proponents of a China Model is Zhang Weiwei, who defines the model as a blend of a planned economy with market mechanisms and a top-down governance structure complemented by some grassroots electoral participation. Zhang contrasts the China model with the American approach to democracy, describing the American model as a democracy of a few interest groups led by oligarchs. Zhang's bestseller The China Wave: Rise of a Civilizational State describes his view of a China model.

Xi Jinping states that China does not seek to export its socialist system or its developmental model. According to Xi, developing countries can and should learn from Chinese wisdom and solutions as appropriate.

In 2018, Zhang Weiying, professor at Peking University's National School of Development, argued that China's economic development since 1978 was not due to a distinctive "China model". He added that, "From the western perspective, the 'China model' theory makes China into an alarming outlier, and must lead to conflict between China and the western world", adding that the tariffs and the trade war pursued by U.S. president Donald Trump are an understandable response to perceived antagonism from China: "In the eyes of westerners, the so-called 'China model' is 'state capitalism', which is incompatible with fair trade and world peace and must not be allowed to advance triumphantly without impediment". This speech was removed from the university website after it was widely circulated online. Shen Hong of the Unirule Institute of Economics warned against abandoning Deng Xiaoping's post-1978 reform and opening up, telling the Financial Times: "Without a doubt, reform and opening up eliminated the ideological conflict between China and the US, as well as the whole western world, and gradually brought convergence in terms of values".

=== Daniel Bell ===
Daniel Bell asserts that the China Model China's strategy is creating free-market capitalism with an authoritarian one-party state that prioritizes political stability. Yet he unveils more complexity to the China Model in his analysis.

On the economic side, he argues that though the flow of labor, capital, and commodities resembles a free-market economy, the government still has a tight grip on key industries, including "utilities, transportation, telecommunications, finance, and the media." He describes China's economic model as a "three-tier enterprise system consisting of large, central government firms; hybrid local and foreign firms; and small-scale capitalism."

On the politics side, though security apparatus is essential to the Chinese Communist Party (CCP), it has initiated some reforms, unlike the dictatorships in North Korea and the Middle East. He again proposes a three-tier model: "democracy at the bottom, experimentation in the middle, and meritocracy at the top."

He concludes that, since these characteristics are unique to China, it is permissible to call it the China Model.

=== Frank Fang ===
Frank Fang defends the China Model—mainly, the state structure of One-Party Constitutionalism—in the article "Taking the China Model Seriously: One-Party Constitutionalism and Economic Development," published in Contemporary Chinese Political Thought, 2012.

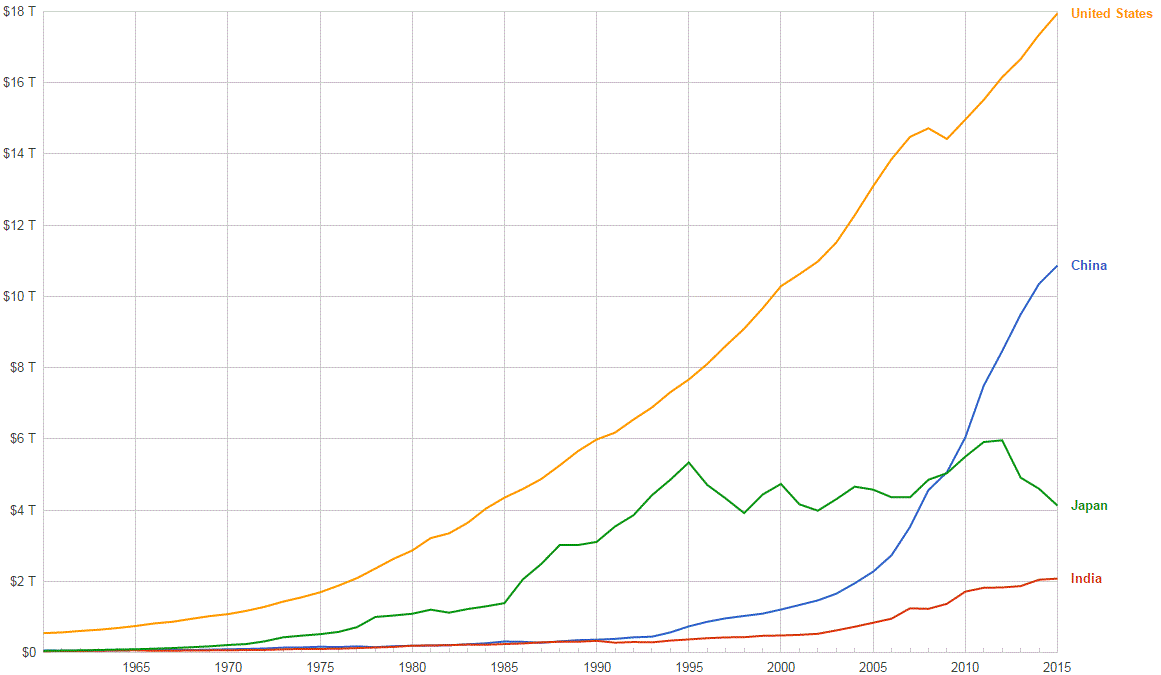
China's nominal GDP trend from 1952 to 2005. Note the rapid increase since reform in the late 1970s.

Partly, Fang's formulation of One-Party Constitutionalism is a response to Fukuyama's "End of History" thesis— "the end point of mankind's ideological evolution and the universalization of Western liberal democracy as the final form of human government." Rather, he posits that each form of state has its weaknesses, and democracy is not the necessarily the one with the fewest; he argues that the China's "dominant-party rulership," which characterizes the China Model, is thriving.

To push forward this notion of "dominant-party rulership," Fang introduces the concept of "property right theory of the state." He asserts that state should not be conceived with "numbers of rulers"—like monarchy, aristocracy, and democracy; rather, state is considered as an "object," or a special firm or organization, to be taken and owned by different "entities." In the light of this interpretation, Fang believes that the "impersonality" and "perpetuality"—or the quality and characteristics—of the entity owning the state, rather than the number of rulers (one for monarchy or many for democracy), should be the standard of evaluation of state structure.

In the light of this model, Fang believes that the Chinese Communist Party (CCP) should be exalted because its presidency with a term limit is a "merit-based system." Fang holds that the five-year, two-term presidential term reflects the virtue of "constitutionalization", although the Chinese President is a figurehead with limited powers. Differentiating this model from previous communist leadership, Fang proposes that the term limit institutes "party-based meritocracy," internally electing a strong leader with merits and competency:

"In the current regime under the CCP, the long-practiced hereditary succession in dynastic politics came to an end. This is common sense, plain and simple. yet party politics with succession (with term limits) had been institutionally transformed from a genetics-driven to a merit-driven arrangement. The logic here is that the merit-driven arrangement would inevitably evolve from reliance on revolutionary credentials, for the first- generation leaders, to reliance on regime-building credentials, for later- generation leaders. in other words, dynastic politics appealed to the "man- date of heaven" and genetics for legitimacy; party politics appealed to the "mandate of merit" and performance for legitimacy. The genetics factor is gone, the patronage factor still helps, and the merit factor is of overwhelming importance."

Fang's essay was published in 2012, before Xi Jinping removed the presidential term limit in 2018.

=== Arif Dirlik ===
One critic of Ramo's plan is University of Oregon professor Arif Dirlik, a "notable specialist in Chinese and in intellectual history," who wrote the paper Beijing Consensus: Beijing "Gongshi." Who Recognizes Whom and to What End. Although Dirlik is intrigued by the concepts and philosophy of Ramo's Beijing Consensus, he says that Ramo's plan is a "Silicon Valley model of development" that ignores the fact that the exploitation of China's labor force by foreign countries was a major part of the Chinese development. Ultimately though, and despite other criticism, Dirlik concludes that the Beijing Consensus does serve an important goal: "The most important aspect of the Beijing Consensus may be an approach to global relationships that seeks, in multinational relationships, a new global order founded on economic relationships, but which also recognizes political and cultural difference as well as differences in regional and national practices within a common global framework."

=== Stefan Halper ===
Stefan Halper, Director of American Studies at the Department of Politics, University of Cambridge and foreign policy official in the Nixon, Ford, and Reagan administrations, offered his own interpretation of the term in his 2012 book, The Beijing Consensus: How China's Authoritarian Model Will Dominate the Twenty-First Century. Halper argues that China's model of economic development without corresponding democratic reforms is serving as a template throughout the developing world. It is one that Beijing eagerly exports (as demonstrated by its support of other illiberal regimes, such as those in Sudan, Angola, or Zimbabwe) by offering developing countries "no-strings-attached gifts and loans", rather than "promoting democracy through economic aid", as does the West. Halper argues China's dependence on natural resources will lock Beijing into relationships with rogue states and that Beijing will not feel increasing pressure to democratize as it grows richer, because it is wealth that gives the regime its legitimacy.

He sees this as establishing a trend "Away from the market-democratic model—and toward a new type of capitalism, which can flourish without the values and norms of Western liberalism" which could ultimately supplant the Washington consensus.

=== Zhang Feng ===
The China Model also extends to other fields besides the state structure and economics. Zhang Feng extends the discussion to the field of international relations, critiquing the development of "IR theory with Chinese characteristics" and "the Chinese School" of IR.

The first mention of term "IR theory with Chinese characteristics" was in 1987, it was later developed by Liang Shoude, a prominent IR Scholar at Peking University. He believes IR theory with Chinese Characteristics should be "developed under the guidance of Marxism, that are based on the paradigms of the international political theory of Chinese statesmen, that draw on both China's cultural tradition and Western IR theory." Fang raises several objections to this model, pointing to vagueness of "Chinese Characteristics" and suggesting that the theory might be "an academic variant of the political slogan 'socialism with Chinese characteristics'." Also, he posits that the "explanatory power"—the ability to explain different situations using the theory—is the main concern for the IR with Chinese Characteristics than defining what it is precisely.

Starting from 2000, there are more voices for "Chinese School of IR", evidenced by a conference in Shanghai 2004 with the theme of "creating Chinese theories, constructing the Chinese School." Yet, Feng thinks this school has not been established so far, although the motivation of such school is clear: "Chinese scholars' confidence, ambition, and self-consciousness about theoretical innovation." Feng, again, raises several objections. He points out that Chinese scholars seem to be obsessed with "grand theory" while methodology and empirical research is usually overlooked. Further, he observes that Chinese scholars seem to be not so critical and reflective on how Chinese traditions might play a role in IR; they rather draw ideas from other academic fields from history, culture, and philosophy, which might not be compatible with academic discipline of IR as it is positivist in nature.

=== Other views ===
Academic Elizabeth Economy asserts that as of 2020, "The China model has perhaps found the most adherents in Africa," citing CCP training seminars for influential African political parties including the Ethiopian People's Revolutionary Democratic Front and the Sudanese People's Liberation Movements.

Publishing in 2026, academic Maria Repnikova contends that "there is no coherent export" of a China model, "but there are extensive efforts to legitimize China."

== See also ==
- Asian Century
- Development economics
- Developmentalism
- Globalism
- Mumbai Consensus
- Seoul Development Consensus
- Washington Consensus
- Reform and opening up
- Deng Xiaoping § Economic reforms
- Developmental state
- Socialist market economy
- State capitalism
