= Washington Consensus =

Economic policies for developing nations

The Washington Consensus is a set of ten economic policy prescriptions considered in the 1980s and 1990s to constitute the "standard" reform package promoted for crisis-wracked developing countries by the Washington, D.C.-based institutions the International Monetary Fund (IMF), World Bank and United States Department of the Treasury. The term was first used in 1989 by English economist John Williamson. The prescriptions encompassed free-market promoting policies such as trade liberalization, privatization and finance liberalization. They also entailed fiscal and monetary policies intended to minimize fiscal deficits and minimize inflation.

Subsequent to Williamson's use of the terminology, and despite his emphatic opposition, the phrase Washington Consensus has come to be used fairly widely in a second, broader sense, to refer to a more general orientation towards a strongly market-based approach (sometimes described as market fundamentalism or neoliberalism). In emphasizing the magnitude of the difference between the two alternative definitions, Williamson has argued (Note: See § Origins of policy agenda and § Broad sense below.) that his ten original, narrowly defined prescriptions have largely acquired the status of "motherhood and apple pie" (i.e., are broadly taken for granted), whereas the subsequent broader definition, representing a form of neoliberal manifesto, "never enjoyed a consensus [in Washington] or anywhere much else" and can reasonably be said to be dead.

Discussion of the Washington Consensus has long been contentious. Partly this reflects a lack of agreement over what is meant by the term, but there are also substantive differences over the merits and consequences of the policy prescriptions involved. Some critics take issue with the original Consensus's emphasis on the opening of developing countries to the global marketplace and transitioning to an emerging market in what they see as an excessive focus on strengthening the influence of domestic market forces, arguably at the expense of governance which will affect key functions of the state. For other commentators, the issue is more what is missing, including such areas as institution-building and targeted efforts to improve opportunities for the weakest in society through equal opportunity, social justice and poverty reduction.

== History ==
=== Original sense: Williamson's Ten Points ===
The concept and name of the Washington Consensus were first presented in 1989 by John Williamson, an economist from the Institute for International Economics, an international economic think tank based in Washington, D.C.

The consensus as originally stated by Williamson included ten broad sets of relatively specific policy recommendations:

1. Fiscal policy discipline, with avoidance of large fiscal deficits relative to GDP;
2. Redirection of public spending from subsidies ("especially indiscriminate subsidies") toward broad-based provision of key pro-growth, pro-poor services like primary education, primary health care and infrastructure investment;
3. Tax reform, broadening the tax base and adopting moderate marginal tax rates;
4. Interest rates that are market determined and positive (but moderate) in real terms;
5. Competitive exchange rates;
6. Trade liberalization: liberalization of imports, with particular emphasis on elimination of quantitative restrictions (licensing, etc.); any trade protection to be provided by low and relatively uniform tariffs;
7. Liberalization of inward foreign direct investment;
8. Privatization of state enterprises;
9. Deregulation: abolition of regulations that impede market entry or restrict competition, except for those justified on safety, environmental and consumer protection grounds, and prudential oversight of financial institutions;
10. Legal security for property rights.

==== Origins of policy agenda ====
Although Williamson's label of the Washington Consensus draws attention to the role of the Washington-based agencies in promoting the above agenda, a number of authors have stressed that Latin American policy-makers arrived at their own packages of policy reforms primarily based on their own analysis of their countries' situations. Thus, according to Joseph Stanislaw and Daniel Yergin, authors of The Commanding Heights, the policy prescriptions described in the Washington Consensus were "developed in Latin America, by Latin Americans, in response to what was happening both within and outside the region." Joseph Stiglitz has written that "the Washington Consensus policies were designed to respond to the very real problems in Latin America and made considerable sense" (though Stiglitz has at times been an outspoken critic of IMF policies as applied to developing nations). In view of the implication conveyed by the term Washington Consensus that the policies were largely external in origin, Stanislaw and Yergin report that the term's creator, John Williamson, has "regretted the term ever since", stating "it is difficult to think of a less diplomatic label."

Williamson regretted the use of "Washington" in the Washington Consensus, as it incorrectly suggested that development policies stemmed from Washington and were externally imposed on others. Williamson said in 2002, "The phrase "Washington Consensus" is a damaged brand name... Audiences the world over seem to believe that this signifies a set of neoliberal policies that have been imposed on hapless countries by the Washington-based international financial institutions and have led them to crisis and misery. There are people who cannot utter the term without foaming at the mouth. My own view is of course quite different. The basic ideas that I attempted to summarize in the Washington Consensus have continued to gain wider acceptance over the past decade, to the point where Lula has had to endorse most of them in order to be electable. For the most part they are motherhood and apple pie, which is why they commanded a consensus."

According to a 2011 study by Nancy Birdsall, Augusto de la Torre, and Felipe Valencia Caicedo, the policies in the original consensus were largely a creation of Latin American politicians and technocrats, with Williamson's role having been to gather the ten points in one place for the first time, rather than to "create" the package of policies. Kate Geohegan of Harvard University's Davis Center for Russian and Eurasian Studies credited Peruvian neoliberal economist Hernando de Soto for inspiring the Washington Consensus. Williamson partly credited de Soto himself for the prescriptions, saying his work was "the outcome of the worldwide intellectual trends to which Latin America provided" and said that de Soto was directly responsible for the recommendation on legal security for property rights.

=== Broad sense ===
The Washington Consensus is not interchangeable with the term "neoliberalism." Williamson recognizes that the term has commonly been used with a different meaning from his original prescription; he opposes the alternative use of the term, which became common after his initial formulation, to cover a broader market fundamentalism or "neoliberal" agenda.

I of course never intended my term to imply policies like capital account liberalization (...I quite consciously excluded that), monetarism, supply-side economics, or a minimal state (getting the state out of welfare provision and income redistribution), which I think of as the quintessentially neoliberal ideas. If that is how the term is interpreted, then we can all enjoy its wake, although let us at least have the decency to recognize that these ideas have rarely dominated thought in Washington and certainly never commanded a consensus there or anywhere much else...

— John Williamson, Did the Washington Consensus Fail?

More specifically, Williamson argues that the first three of his ten prescriptions are uncontroversial in the economic community, while recognizing that the others have evoked some controversy. He argues that one of the least controversial prescriptions, the redirection of spending to infrastructure, health care, and education, has often been neglected. He also argues that, while the prescriptions were focused on reducing certain functions of government (e.g., as an owner of productive enterprises), they would also strengthen government's ability to undertake other actions such as supporting education and health. Williamson says that he does not endorse market fundamentalism, and believes that the Consensus prescriptions, if implemented correctly, would benefit the poor. In a book edited with Pedro-Pablo Kuczynski in 2003, Williamson laid out an expanded reform agenda, emphasizing crisis-proofing of economies, "second-generation" reforms, and policies addressing inequality and social issues.

As noted, in spite of Williamson's reservations, the term Washington Consensus has been used more broadly to describe the general shift towards free market policies that followed the displacement of Keynesianism in the 1970s. In this broad sense the Washington Consensus is sometimes considered to have begun at about 1980. Many commentators see the consensus, especially if interpreted in the broader sense of the term, as having been at its strongest during the 1990s. Some have argued that the consensus in this sense ended at the turn of the century, or at least that it became less influential after about the year 2000. More commonly, commentators have suggested that the Consensus in its broader sense survived until the 2008 financial crisis. Following the 2008–2009 Keynesian resurgence undertaken by governments in response to market failures, a number of journalists, politicians and senior officials from global institutions such as the World Bank began saying that the Washington Consensus was dead. These included former British Prime Minister Gordon Brown, who following the 2009 G-20 London summit, declared "the old Washington Consensus is over". Williamson was asked by The Washington Post in April 2009 whether he agreed with Gordon Brown that the Washington Consensus was dead. He responded:

It depends on what one means by the Washington Consensus. If one means the ten points that I tried to outline, then clearly it's not right. If one uses the interpretation that a number of people—including Joe Stiglitz, most prominently—have foisted on it, that it is a neoliberal tract, then I think it is right.

After the 2010 G-20 Seoul summit announced that it had achieved agreement on a Seoul Development Consensus, the Financial Times editorialized that "Its pragmatic and pluralistic view of development is appealing enough. But the document will do little more than drive another nail into the coffin of a long-deceased Washington consensus."

== Context ==
The widespread adoption by governments of the Washington Consensus was to a large degree a reaction to the macroeconomic crisis that hit much of Latin America, and some other developing regions, during the 1980s. The crisis had multiple origins: the drastic rise in the price of imported oil following the emergence of OPEC, mounting levels of external debt, the rise in US (and hence international) interest rates, and—consequent to the foregoing problems—loss of access to additional foreign credit. The import-substitution policies that had been pursued by many developing country governments in Latin America and elsewhere for several decades had left their economies ill-equipped to expand exports at all quickly to pay for the additional cost of imported oil (by contrast, many countries in East Asia, which had followed more export-oriented strategies, found it comparatively easy to expand exports still further, and as such managed to accommodate the external shocks with much less economic and social disruption). Unable either to expand external borrowing further or to ramp up export earnings easily, many Latin American countries faced no obvious sustainable alternatives to reducing overall domestic demand via greater fiscal discipline, while in parallel adopting policies to reduce protectionism and increase their economies' export orientation.

Many countries have endeavored to implement varying components of the reform packages, the implementation sometimes being a condition for receiving loans from the IMF and World Bank.

== Effects ==
According to a 2020 study, the implementation of policies associated with the Washington Consensus significantly raised real GDP per capita over a 5- to 10-year horizon. According to a 2021 study, the implementation of the Washington Consensus in Brazil, Chile, and Mexico had "mixed results": "macroeconomic stability is much improved, but economic growth has been heterogeneous and generally disappointing, despite improvement relative to the 1980s." Another 2021 study found that the implementation of the Washington Consensus in sub-Saharan Africa led to "initial declines in per capita economic growth over the 1980s and 1990s" but "notable increases in per capita real GDP growth in the post–2000 period." The study found that "the ability to implement pro-poor policies alongside market-oriented reforms played a central role in successful policy performance."

Williamson has summarized the overall results on growth, employment and poverty reduction in many countries as "disappointing, to say the least". He attributed this limited impact to three factors: (a) the Consensus per se placed no special emphasis on mechanisms for avoiding economic crises, which proved very damaging; (b) the reforms—both those listed in his article and, a fortiori, those actually implemented—were incomplete; and (c) the reforms cited were insufficiently ambitious with respect to targeting improvements in income distribution, and need to be complemented by stronger efforts in this direction. Rather than an argument for abandoning the original ten prescriptions, though, Williamson concludes that they are "motherhood and apple pie" and "not worth debating".

=== Latin America ===
The Washington Consensus resulted with the La Década Perdida or "The Lost Decade" in Latin America, when many nations in the region faced sovereign debt crises. It has been argued that the Washington Consensus resulted in socioeconomic exclusion and weakened trade unions in Latin America, resulting with unrest in the region. Countries who followed the consensus initially alleviated high inflation and excessive regulation, though economic growth and poverty relief was insignificant. The consensus resulted with a shrinking middle class in Latin America that prompted dissatisfaction of neoliberalism, a turn to the political left and populist leaders by the late-1990s, with economists saying that the consensus established support for Hugo Chávez in Venezuela, Evo Morales in Bolivia and Rafael Correa in Ecuador.

==== Argentina ====
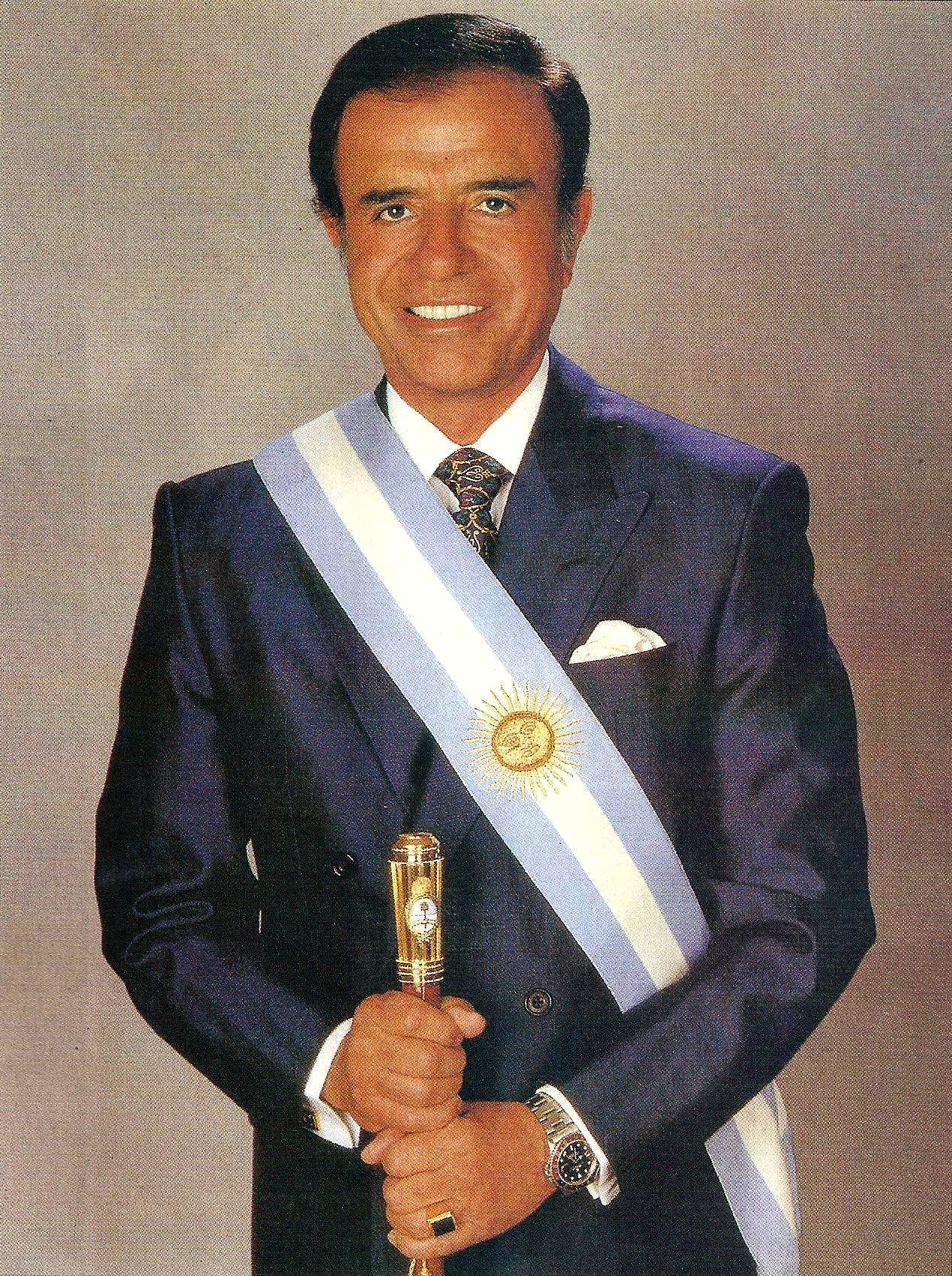
Argentine President Carlos Menem

The Argentine economic crisis of 1999–2002 is held out as an example of the economic consequences said by some to have been wrought by application of the Washington Consensus.

In October 1998, the IMF invited Argentine President Carlos Menem, to talk about the successful Argentine experience, at the Annual Meeting of the Board of Governors. President Menem's Minister of Economy (1991–1996), Domingo Cavallo, the architect of the Menem administration's economic policies, specifically including "convertibility", said:

On the second semester of 1998 Argentina was considered in Washington the most successful economy among the ones that had restructured its debt within the Brady's Plan framework. None of the Washington Consensus' sponsors were interested in pointing out that the Argentine economic reforms had differences with its 10 recommendations. On the contrary, Argentina was considered the best pupil of the IMF, the World Bank and the USA government.

The problems which arise with reliance on a fixed exchange rate mechanism (above) are discussed in the World Bank report Economic Growth in the 1990s: Learning from a Decade of Reform, which questions whether expectations can be "positively affected by tying a government's hands". In the early 1990s there was a point of view that countries should move to either fixed or completely flexible exchange rates to reassure market participants of the complete removal of government discretion in foreign exchange matters. After the Argentina collapse, some observers believe that removing government discretion by creating mechanisms that impose large penalties may, on the contrary, actually itself undermine expectations. Velasco and Neut (2003) "argue that if the world is uncertain and there are situations in which the lack of discretion will cause large losses, a precommitment device can actually make things worse". In chapter 7 of its report (Financial Liberalization: What Went Right, What Went Wrong?) the World Bank analyses what went wrong in Argentina, summarizes the lessons from the experience, and draws suggestions for its future policy.

The IMF's Independent Evaluation Office has issued a review of the lessons of Argentina for the institution, summarized in the following quotation:

The Argentine crisis yields a number of lessons for the IMF, some of which have already been learned and incorporated into revised policies and procedures. This evaluation suggests ten lessons, in the areas of surveillance and program design, crisis management, and the decision-making process.

While President Néstor Kirchner's reliance on price controls and similar administrative measures (often aimed primarily at foreign-invested firms such as utilities) clearly ran counter to the spirit of the Consensus, his administration in fact ran an extremely tight fiscal ship and maintained a highly competitive floating exchange rate; Argentina's immediate bounce-back from crisis, further aided by abrogating its debts and a fortuitous boom in prices of primary commodities, leaves open issues of longer-term sustainability. The Economist has argued that the Néstor Kirchner administration will end up as one more in Argentina's long history of populist governments. In October 2008, Kirchner's wife and successor as president, Cristina Kirchner, announced her government's intention to nationalize pension funds from the privatized system implemented by Menem-Cavallo. Accusations have emerged of the manipulation of official statistics under the Kirchners (most notoriously, for inflation) to create an inaccurately positive picture of economic performance. The Economist removed Argentina's inflation measure from its official indicators, saying that they were no longer reliable.

In 2003, Argentina's and Brazil's presidents, Néstor Kirchner and Luiz Inácio Lula da Silva, signed the "Buenos Aires Consensus", a manifesto opposing the Washington Consensus' policies. Skeptical political observers note, however, that Lula's rhetoric on such public occasions should be distinguished from the policies actually implemented by his administration.

==== Venezuela ====
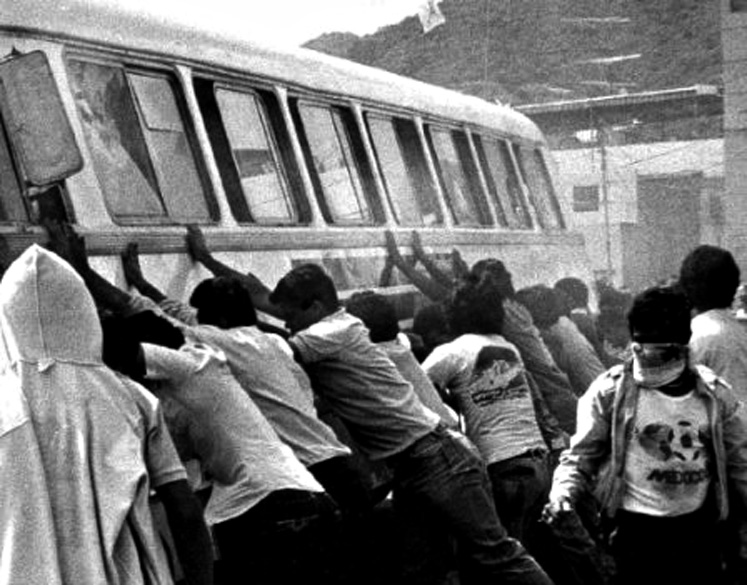
A group of rioters attempting to push over a bus during the Caracazo

CANTV's old logo, state telecommunications company privatized in 1991

In the 1980s, a fall in oil prices and the start of the Latin American debt crisis brought economic difficulties to Venezuela. Additionally, President Luis Herrera Campins' economic policies led to the devaluation of the Venezuelan bolívar against the US dollar in a day that would be known as Viernes Negro (English: Black Friday). Following the oil price crisis, the Herrera Campins government declared bankruptcy to the international banking community and then enacted currency restrictions. The policies centred on the establishment of an exchange-rate regime, imposing a restriction on the movement of currencies, and were strongly objected to by the then-president of the Central Bank of Venezuela, Leopoldo Díaz Bruzual. The currency controls devalued Venezuelan purchasing power by 75% in a matter of hours; banks did not open on Viernes Negro, and even the Central Bank did not have many reserves of foreign currencies, causing the government to devalue the bolívar by 100%.

Carlos Andrés Pérez based his campaign for the 1988 Venezuelan general election in his legacy of abundance during his first presidential period and initially rejected liberalization policies. Venezuela's international reserves were only US$300 million at the time of Pérez' election into the presidency; Pérez decided to respond to the debt, public spending, economic restrictions and rentier state by liberalizing the economy and proceeded to implement Washington consensus reforms. He announced a technocratic cabinet and a group of economic policies to fix macroeconomic imbalances known as El Gran Viraje (English: The Great Turn), called by detractors as El Paquetazo Económico (English: The Economic Package). Among the policies there was the reduction of fuel subsidies and the increase of public transportation fares by thirty percent (VEB 16 Venezuelan bolívares, or US$0.4). The increase was supposed to be implemented on 1 March 1989, but bus drivers decided to apply the price rise on 27 February, a day before payday in Venezuela. In response, protests and rioting began on the morning of 27 February 1989 in Guarenas, a town near Caracas; a lack of timely intervention by authorities, as the Caracas Metropolitan Police was on a labor strike, led to the protests and rioting quickly spreading to the capital and other towns across the country.

By late 1991, as part of the economic reforms, Carlos Andrés Pérez' administration had sold three banks, a shipyard, two sugar mills, an airline, a telephone company and a cell phone band, receiving a total of US$2,287 million. The most remarkable auction was CANTV's, a telecommunications company, which was sold at the price of US$1,885 million to the consortium composed of American AT&T International, General Telephone Electronic and the Venezuelan Electricidad de Caracas and Banco Mercantil. The privatization ended Venezuela's monopoly over telecommunications and surpassed even the most optimistic predictions, with over US$1,000 million above the base price and US$500 million more than the bid offered by the competition group. By the end of the year, inflation had dropped to 31%, Venezuela's international reserves were now worth US$14,000 million and there was an economic growth of 9% (called as an "Asian growth"), the largest in Latin America at the time. The Caracazo and previous inequality in Venezuela were used to justify the subsequent 1992 Venezuelan coup d'état attempts and led to the rise of Hugo Chávez's Revolutionary Bolivarian Movement-200, who in 1982 had promised to depose the bipartisanship governments. Once elected in 1998, Chávez began to revert the policies of his predecessors.

== Criticism ==
As of the 2000s, several Latin American countries were led by socialist or other left wing governments, some of which—including Argentina and Venezuela—have campaigned for (and to some degree adopted) policies contrary to the Washington Consensus policies. Other Latin American countries with governments of the left, including Brazil, Chile and Peru, in practice adopted the bulk of the policies included in Williamson's list, even though they criticized the market fundamentalism that these are often associated with.

General criticism of the economics of the consensus is now more widely established, such as that outlined by US scholar Dani Rodrik, Professor of International Political Economy at Harvard University, in his paper Goodbye Washington Consensus, Hello Washington Confusion?.

As Williamson has pointed out, the term has come to be used in a broader sense than its original intention, as a synonym for market fundamentalism or neoliberalism. In this broader sense, Williamson states, it has been criticized by people such as George Soros and Joseph Stiglitz. The Washington Consensus is also criticized by others such as some Latin American politicians and heterodox economists such as Erik Reinert. The term has become associated with neoliberal policies in general and drawn into the broader debate over the expanding role of the free market, constraints upon the state, and the influence of the United States, and globalization more broadly, on countries' national sovereignty.

Some US economists, such as Joseph Stiglitz and Dani Rodrik, have challenged what are sometimes described as the 'fundamentalist' policies of the IMF and the US Treasury for what Stiglitz calls a 'one size fits all' treatment of individual economies. According to Stiglitz the treatment suggested by the IMF is too simple: one dose, and fast—stabilize, liberalize and privatize, without prioritizing or watching for side effects.

The reforms did not always work out the way they were intended. While growth generally improved across much of Latin America, it was in most countries less than the reformers had originally hoped for (and the "transition crisis", as noted above deeper and more sustained than hoped for in some of the former socialist economies). Success stories in Sub-Saharan Africa during the 1990s were relatively few and far in between, and market-oriented reforms by themselves offered no formula to deal with the growing public health emergency in which the continent became embroiled. The critics, meanwhile, argue that the disappointing outcomes have vindicated their concerns about the inappropriateness of the standard reform agenda.

Besides the excessive belief in market fundamentalism and international economic institutions in attributing the failure of the Washington consensus, Stiglitz provided a further explanation about why it failed. In his article "The Post Washington Consensus Consensus", he claims that the Washington consensus policies failed to efficiently handle the economic structures within developing countries. The cases of East Asian states such as Korea and Taiwan are known as a success story in which their remarkable economic growth was attributed to a larger role of the government by undertaking industrial policies and increasing domestic savings within their territory. From the cases, the role for government was proven to be critical at the beginning stage of the dynamic process of development, at least until the markets by themselves can produce efficient outcomes.

The policies pursued by the international financial institutions which came to be called the Washington consensus policies or neoliberalism entailed a much more circumscribed role for the state than were embraced by most of the East Asian countries, a set of policies which (in another simplification) came to be called the development state.

The critique laid out in the World Bank's study Economic Growth in the 1990s: Learning from a Decade of Reform (2005) shows how far discussion has come from the original ideas of the Washington Consensus. Gobind Nankani, a former vice-president for Africa at the World Bank, wrote in the preface: "there is no unique universal set of rules.... [W]e need to get away from formulae and the search for elusive 'best practices'...." (p. xiii). The World Bank's new emphasis is on the need for humility, for policy diversity, for selective and modest reforms, and for experimentation.

The World Bank's report Learning from Reform shows some of the developments of the 1990s. There was a deep and prolonged collapse in output in some (though by no means all) countries making the transition from communism to market economies (many of the Central and East European countries, by contrast, made the adjustment relatively rapidly). Academic studies show that more than two decades into the transition, some of the former communist countries, especially parts of the former Soviet Union, had still not caught up to their levels of output before 1989. A 2001 study by economist Steven Rosefielde posits that there were 3.4 million premature deaths in Russia from 1990 to 1998, which he party blames on the shock therapy imposed by the Washington Consensus. Neoliberal policies associated with the Washington Consensus, including pension privatization, the imposition of a flat tax, monetarism, cutting of corporate taxes, and central bank independence, continued into the 2000s. Many Sub-Saharan African's economies failed to take off during the 1990s, in spite of efforts at policy reform, changes in the political and external environments, and continued heavy influx of foreign aid. Uganda, Tanzania, and Mozambique were among countries that showed some success, but they remained fragile. There were several successive and painful financial crises in Latin America, East Asia, Russia, and Turkey. The Latin American recovery in the first half of the 1990s was interrupted by crises later in the decade. There was less growth in per capita GDP in Latin America than in the period of rapid post-War expansion and opening in the world economy, 1950–80. Argentina, described by some as "the poster boy of the Latin American economic revolution", came crashing down in 2002.

A significant body of economists and policy-makers argues that what was wrong with the Washington Consensus as originally formulated by Williamson had less to do with what was included than with what was missing. This view asserts that countries such as Brazil, Chile, Peru and Uruguay, largely governed by parties of the left in recent years, did not—whatever their rhetoric—in practice abandon most of the substantive elements of the Consensus. Countries that have achieved macroeconomic stability through fiscal and monetary discipline have been loath to abandon it: Lula, the former President of Brazil (and former leader of the Workers' Party of Brazil), has stated explicitly that the defeat of hyperinflation was among the most important positive contributions of the years of his presidency to the welfare of the country's poor, although the remaining influence of his policies on tackling poverty and maintaining a steady low rate of inflation are being discussed and doubted in the wake of the Brazilian Economic Crisis currently occurring in Brazil.

These economists and policy-makers would, however, overwhelmingly agree that the Washington Consensus was incomplete, and that countries in Latin America and elsewhere need to move beyond "first generation" macroeconomic and trade reforms to a stronger focus on productivity-boosting reforms and direct programs to support the poor. This includes improving the investment climate and eliminating red tape (especially for smaller firms), strengthening institutions (in areas like justice systems), fighting poverty directly via the types of Conditional Cash Transfer programs adopted by countries like Mexico and Brazil, improving the quality of primary and secondary education, boosting countries' effectiveness at developing and absorbing technology, and addressing the needs of historically disadvantaged groups including indigenous peoples and Afro-descendant populations across Latin America.

In a book edited with future president of Peru, Pedro Pablo Kuczynski in 2003, John Williamson laid out an expanded reform agenda, emphasizing crisis-proofing of economies, "second-generation" reforms, and policies addressing inequality and social issues.

Nobel laureate Michael Spence has defended the Washington Consensus, arguing "I continue to find that when properly interpreted as a guide to the formulation of country-specific development strategies, the Washington Consensus has withstood the test of time quite well." According to Spence, "The Washington Consensus was never intended as a complete or a one-size-fits-all development program." He does however note that the Washington Consensus "was vulnerable to misuse due to the absence of an accompanying and explicit development model."

=== Anti-globalization movement ===
Many critics of trade liberalization, such as Noam Chomsky, Tariq Ali, Susan George, and Naomi Klein, see the Washington Consensus as a way to open the labor market of underdeveloped economies to exploitation by companies from more developed economies. The prescribed reductions in tariffs and other trade barriers allow the free movement of goods across borders according to market forces, but labor is not permitted to move freely due to the requirements of a visa or a work permit. This creates an economic climate where goods are manufactured using cheap labor in underdeveloped economies and then exported to rich First World economies for sale at what the critics argue are huge markups, with the balance of the markup said to accrue to large multinational corporations. The criticism is that workers in the Third World economy nevertheless remain poor, as any pay raises they may have received over what they made before trade liberalization are said to be offset by inflation, whereas workers in the First World country become unemployed, while the wealthy owners of the multinational grow even more wealthy.

Despite macroeconomic advances, poverty and inequality remain at high levels in Latin America. About one of every three people—165 million in total—still live on less than $2 a day. Roughly a third of the population has no access to electricity or basic sanitation, and an estimated 10 million children suffer from malnutrition. These problems are not, however, new: Latin America was the most economically unequal region in the world in 1950, and has continued to be so ever since, during periods both of state-directed import-substitution and (subsequently) of market-oriented liberalization.

Some socialist political leaders in Latin America have been vocal and well-known critics of the Washington Consensus, such as the late Venezuelan President Hugo Chávez, Cuban ex-President Fidel Castro, Bolivian President Evo Morales, and Rafael Correa, President of Ecuador. In Argentina, too, the recent Justicialist Party government of Néstor Kirchner and Cristina Fernández de Kirchner undertook policy measures which represented a repudiation of at least some Consensus policies.

=== Proponents of the "European model" and the "Asian way" ===
Some European and Asian economists suggest that "infrastructure-savvy economies" such as Norway, Singapore, and China have partially rejected the underlying Neoclassical "financial orthodoxy" that characterizes the Washington Consensus, instead initiating a pragmatist development path of their own based on sustained, large-scale, government-funded investments in strategic infrastructure projects: "Successful countries such as Singapore, Indonesia, and South Korea still remember the harsh adjustment mechanisms imposed abruptly upon them by the IMF and World Bank during the 1997–1998 'Asian Crisis' […] What they have achieved in the past 10 years is all the more remarkable: they have quietly abandoned the Washington Consensus by investing massively in infrastructure projects […] this pragmatic approach proved to be very successful".

While opinion varies among economists, Rodrik pointed out what he claimed was a factual paradox: while China and India increased their economies' reliance on free market forces to a limited extent, their general economic policies remained the exact opposite to the Washington Consensus' main recommendations. Both had high levels of protectionism, no privatization, extensive industrial policies planning, and lax fiscal and financial policies through the 1990s. Had they been dismal failures they would have presented strong evidence in support of the recommended Washington Consensus policies. However they turned out to be successes. According to Rodrik: "While the lessons drawn by proponents and skeptics differ, it is fair to say that nobody really believes in the Washington Consensus anymore. The question now is not whether the Washington Consensus is dead or alive; it is what will replace it".

Rodrik's account of Chinese or Indian policies during the period is not universally accepted. Among other things those policies involved major turns in the direction of greater reliance upon market forces, both domestically and internationally.

== Subsidies for agriculture ==
The Washington Consensus as formulated by Williamson includes provision for the redirection of public spending from subsidies ("especially indiscriminate subsidies") toward broad-based provision of key pro-growth, pro-poor services like primary education, primary health care and infrastructure investment. This definition leaves some room for debate over specific public spending programs. One area of public controversy has focused on the issues of subsidies to farmers for fertilizers and other modern farm inputs: on the one hand, these can be criticized as subsidies, on the other, some experts argued that smallholder farmers often lack access to technical information, and these funding can generate positive externalities that might justify the subsidy involved.

Some critics of the Washington Consensus cite Malawi's experience with agricultural subsidies, for example, as exemplifying perceived flaws in the package's prescriptions. For decades, the World Bank and donor nations pressed Malawi, a predominantly rural country in Africa, to cut back or eliminate government fertilizer subsidies to farmers. World Bank experts also urged the country to have Malawi farmers shift to growing cash crops for export and to use foreign exchange earnings to import food. For years, Malawi hovered on the brink of famine; after a particularly disastrous corn harvest in 2005, almost five million of its 13 million people needed emergency food aid. Malawi's president Bingu wa Mutharika then decided to reverse policy. Introduction of deep fertilizer subsidies (and lesser ones for seed), abetted by good rains, helped farmers produce record-breaking corn harvests in 2006 and 2007; according to government reports, corn production leapt from 1.2 million metric tons in 2005 to 2.7 million in 2006 and 3.4 million in 2007. The prevalence of acute child hunger has fallen sharply and Malawi turned away emergency food aid in 2006.

In a commentary on the Malawi experience prepared for the Center for Global Development, development economists Vijaya Ramachandran and Peter Timmer argue that fertilizer subsidies in parts of Africa (and Indonesia) can have benefits that substantially exceed their costs. They caution, however, that how the subsidy is operated is crucial to its long-term success, and warn against allowing fertilizer distribution to become a monopoly. Ramachandran and Timmer also stress that African farmers need more than just input subsidies—they need better research to develop new inputs and new seeds, as well as better transport and energy infrastructure. The World Bank reportedly now sometimes supports the temporary use of fertilizer subsidies aimed at the poor and carried out in a way that fosters private markets: "In Malawi, Bank officials say they generally support Malawi's policy, though they criticize the government for not having a strategy to eventually end the subsidies, question whether its 2007 corn production estimates are inflated and say there is still a lot of room for improvement in how the subsidy is carried out".

== Alternative usage vis-à-vis foreign policy ==
In early 2008, the term "Washington Consensus" was used in a different sense as a metric for analyzing American mainstream media coverage of U.S. foreign policy generally and Middle East policy specifically. Marda Dunsky writes, "Time and again, with exceedingly rare exceptions, the media repeat without question, and fail to challenge the "Washington consensus"—the official mind-set of US governments on Middle East peacemaking over time." According to syndicated columnist William Pfaff, Beltway centrism in American mainstream media coverage of foreign affairs is the rule rather than the exception: "Coverage of international affairs in the US is almost entirely Washington-driven. That is, the questions asked about foreign affairs are Washington's questions, framed in terms of domestic politics and established policy positions. This invites uninformative answers and discourages unwanted or unpleasant views."

== See also ==
- American imperialism
- Beijing Consensus
- Bretton Woods system
- Central America Free Trade Agreement (CAFTA)
- Democratic capitalism
- The End of History and the Last Man
- Andre Gunder Frank
- Gross domestic product
- Hyperinflation
- Immanuel Wallerstein
- Lima Consensus
- Mumbai Consensus
- North American Free Trade Agreement (NAFTA)
- Poverty Reduction Strategy Paper
- Structural adjustment
- World Systems Theory

== Sources ==
=== Primary sources ===
- Accelerated Development in Sub-Saharan Africa: An Agenda for Action, Eliot Berg, coord., (World Bank, 1981).
- The Spirit of Democratic Capitalism, by Michael Novak (1982).
- El Otro Sendero (The Other Path), by Hernando de Soto (1986).
- Toward Renewed Economic Growth in Latin America, by Bela Balassa, Gerardo M. Bueno, Pedro-Pablo Kuczynski, and Mario Henrique (Institute for International Economics, 1986).
- Latin American Adjustment: How Much Has Happened, edited by John Williamson (Institute for International Economics, 1990).
- The Macroeconomics of Populism in Latin America, edited by Rudiger Dornbusch and Sebastian Edwards (1991).
- Global Linkages: Macroeconomic Interdependence and Cooperation in the World Economy, by Jeffrey Sachs and Warwick McKibbin (1991).
- World Development Report 1991: The Challenge of Development, by Lawrence Summers, Vinod Thomas, et al. (World Bank, 1991).
- "Development and the "Washington Consensus"", in World Development Vol 21:1329–1336 by John Williamson (1993).
- "Recent Lessons of Development", Lawrence H. Summers & Vinod Thomas (1993).
- Latin America's Journey to the Market: From Macroeconomic Shocks to Institutional Therapy, by Moises Naím (1994).
- Economistas y Politicos: La Política de la Reforma Económica, by Agustín Fallas-Santana (1996).
- The Crisis of Global Capitalism: Open Society Endangered, by George Soros (1997).
- Beyond Tradeoffs: Market Reform and Equitable Growth in Latin America, edited by Nancy Birdsall, Carol Graham, and Richard Sabot (Brookings Institution, 1998).
- The Third Way: Toward a Renewal of Social Democracy, by Anthony Giddens (1998).
- The Lexus and the Olive Tree: Understanding Globalization, by Thomas Friedman (1999).
- "Fads and Fashion in Economic Reforms: Washington Consensus or Washington Confusion?", by Moisés Naím (IMF, 1999).
- Washington Contentious: Economic Policies for Social Equity in Latin America, by Nancy Birdsall and Augusto de la Torre (Carnegie Endowment for International Peace and Inter-American Dialogue, 2001)
- "Did the Washington Consensus Fail?", by John Williamson (Speech at PIIE, 2002).
- Kuczynski, Pedro-Pablo; Williamson, John, eds. (2003). After the Washington Consensus: Restarting Growth and Reform in Latin America. Washington, D.C.: Institute for International Economics. ISBN 9780881324518.
  - Williamson, John (2003). "An Agenda for Restarting Growth and Reform" (PDF). In Kuczynski, Pedro-Pablo; Williamson, John (eds.). After the Washington Consensus: Restarting Growth and Reform in Latin America. Washington, D.C.: Institute for International Economics. ISBN 9780881324518.
- Implementing Economic Reforms in Mexico: The Washington Consensus as a Roadmap for Developing Countries by Terrence Fluharty (2007) Implementing Economic Reforms in Mexico: The Washington Consensus as a Roadmap for Developing Countries

=== Secondary sources ===
- Ip, Greg. (2021) "How Bidenomics Seeks to Remake the Economic Consensus: Declaring end to neoliberalism, new thinkers play down constraints of deficits, inflation and incentives" Wall Street Journal April 7, 2021
- Risen, Clay. (2021) "John Williamson, 83, Dies; Economist Defined the ‘Washington Consensus': A careful pragmatist, he regretted the way his term, aimed at developing countries, was misinterpreted by free-market ideologues and anti-globalization activists." New York Times April 15, 2021
- Babb, Sarah, and Alexander Kentikelenis. (2021) "People have long predicted the collapse of the Washington Consensus. It keeps reappearing under new guises: 30 years later, global financial institutions still condition loans on policies like 'structural reforms’" Washington Post April 16, 2021
- Kläffling, David. (2021) "Quick & New: Washington consensus 2.0? The Washington consensus has for long time been the symbol of market liberalism. Now, there may be a 'new Washington consensus', writes Martin Sandbu from the Financial Times based on what the International Monetary Fund and the World Bank argue in recent publications around their traditional spring meetings." New Paradigm (April 12, 2021)
- Rodrik, Dani (2006). "Goodbye Washington Consensus, Hello Washington Confusion? A Review of the World Bank's Economic Growth in the 1990s: Learning from a Decade of Reform" (PDF). Journal of Economic Literature. 44 (4): 973–987. doi:10.1257/jel.44.4.973. JSTOR 30032391.
- Yergin, Daniel; Stanislaw, Joseph (2002). The Commanding Heights: The Battle for the World Economy. New York City: Simon & Schuster. ISBN 9780743229630.
- Santiso, Carlos (2004). "The contentious Washington Consensus: Reforming the reforms in emerging markets". Review of International Political Economy. 11 (4): 828–844. doi:10.1080/0969229042000279810. JSTOR 4177523. S2CID 153363966.
- Stability with Growth: Macroeconomics, Liberalization, and Development (Initiative for Policy Dialogue Series C); by Joseph E. Stiglitz, Jose Antonio Ocampo, Shari Spiegel, Ricardo French-Davis, and Deepak Nayyar; Oxford University Press 2006]
- Economic Crisis and Policy Choice: The Politics of Adjustment in the Third World, edited by Joan M. Nelson (1990).
- Crisis and Reform in Latin America: From Despair to Hope, by Sebastian Edwards (1995).
- Fault Lines of Democracy in Post-Transition Latin America, Felipe Agüero and Jeffrey Stark (1998).
- What Kind of Democracy? What Kind of Market? Latin America in the Age of Neoliberalism, by Philip D. Oxhorn and Graciela Ducatenzeiler (1998).
- Latin America Transformed: Globalization and Modernity, by Robert N. Gwynne and Cristóbal Kay (1999).
- The Internationalization of Palace Wars: Lawyers, Economists, and the Contest to Transform Latin American States, by Yves Dezalay and Bryant G. Garth (2002).
- FONDAD: Diversity in Development: Reconsidering the Washington Consensus, edited by Jan Joost Teunissen and Age Akkerman (2004).
- The Washington Consensus as Policy Prescription for Development (World Bank)
- What Should the World Bank Think about the Washington Consensus?, by John Williamson.
- Fabian Global Forum for Progressive Global Politics: The Washington Consensus, by Adam Lent.
- Unraveling the Washington Consensus, An Interview with Joseph Stiglitz
- Developing Brazil: overcoming the failure of the Washington consensus/ Luiz Carlos Bresser-Pereira/ Lynne Rienner Publishers, 2009

== Bibliography ==
- Márquez, Laureano; Sanabria, Eduardo (2018). "La democracia pierde energía". Historieta de Venezuela: De Macuro a Maduro (1st ed.). Gráficas Pedrazas. ISBN 978-1-7328777-1-9.
- Rivero, Mirtha (2011). La rebelión de los náufragos (9th ed.). Alfa. ISBN 978-980-354-295-5.
