= Honbyakushō =

Type of peasant in pre-modern Japan

Honbyakushō (本百姓) were a type of peasant (hyakushō; 百姓) in pre-modern Japan. They were the owners of farmland in villages, and it fell to them to pay taxes for the village. This made them very active in village government.

Following the middle of the Edo period, honbyakushō were also called takamochi-hyakushō (高持百姓).
