= Mumbai Consensus =

India's model of economic development

The Mumbai Consensus is a term used to refer to India's model of economic development, with a "people-centric" approach for managing its economy which may be taken up by other developing nations in time. The Indian model of economic growth, which relies on its domestic market more than exports, boosted domestic consumption rather than investment, pursued service-oriented industries rather than low-skilled manufacturing industries, and has greatly differed from the typical Asian strategy of exporting labor-intensive, low-priced manufactured goods to the West. This model of economic development remains distinct from the Beijing Consensus with an export-led growth economy, and the Washington Consensus focused instead on encouraging the spread of democracy and free trade.

== Origin ==
The term was coined by Larry Summers, an American economist and a key advisor as well as decision-maker for the White House in the Obama administration at the U.S.-India Business Council in 2010. Summers pointed out that India has a model that should be increasingly watched and could potentially be used as an example for other developing nations, suggesting that over the time many nations will adopt this model:

And perhaps in 2040, the discussion will be less about the Washington Consensus or the Beijing Consensus, than about the Mumbai Consensus – a third way not based on ideas of laissez-faire capitalism that have proven obsolete or ideas of authoritarian capitalism that ultimately will prove not to be enduringly successful. Instead, a Mumbai Consensus based on the idea of a democratic developmental state, driven not by a mercantilist emphasis on exports, but a people-centered emphasis on growing levels of consumptions and a widening middle class." Larry Summers

Summers also suggested that India's model may become increasingly viable for other nations because it does not fail the middle class but instead allows this group to prosper, whilst not deviating from the traditional capitalist approach to running the economy. However, he acknowledged number of challenges that would hurt the viability of a Mumbai Consensus, with a need of continued assurance of efficiency of government whilst also having continued faith in the public sector (additionally with the Public Sector Undertakings in India) and action which means that continued economic prosperity does not just lead to the success of a select few.

== Pluralistic democracy ==
The strength of India's democracy has consistently shown itself in fair and free elections, at regular intervals without being characterized by military coups or frequent martial law impositions. In the 2009 Lok Sabha elections, 300 political parties and almost 8,000 candidates ran for office, with voting occurring at 828,804 polling stations across India. Chief Minister of the largest and most populous state of Uttar Pradesh, prove that such social barriers are gradually breaking down. With 1652 languages and dialects spoken, the Indian democracy is home to an incredible diversity of ethnic and linguistic backgrounds. India contains the majority of the world's Zoroastrians, Sikhs, Hindus, Jains and Baháʼís. India is also home to the third largest Muslim population in the world after Indonesia and Pakistan. Gender issues, long a thorny criticism of India, have improved. Out of 3.5 million village legislators, 1.2 million are women. Though gender issues continue to be persistent, especially in conservative rural areas, a young woman in India has the possibility of pursuing a political or entrepreneurial career, spurred on by countless micro-finance institutions, that only lend to women entrepreneurs. The ability of a country characterized by such diversity to continue to participate in a democratic framework has many policy implications for similarly diverse countries around the world.

== Gradualism in decentralization, privatization, and entrepreneurship ==
Though India, post independence, started down a socialist government route spearheaded by Nehru and similar to China's state-run model, over time, India's political framework has gradually decentralized and power has shifted to state and local legislative bodies. Further, India has gradually liberalized economically, especially since 1991 when former Finance Minister and former Prime Minister, Manmohan Singh initiated a series of economic and financial liberalizing reforms. As opposed to the quick-fire privatization campaigns seen in Argentina or the Czech Republic, India has opted for a gradual move away from large state-owned enterprises; this contradicts both the Washington Consensus in terms of its pace and the Beijing Consensus in terms of its focus. Labeling it ‘disinvestment’, the government's program started by simply reducing the government's holdings in such large enterprises by 20%, gradually followed by 49% and finally by large-scale transfers of control to private domestic and foreign investors.

Important public sector enterprises that have been privatized have been the Indian Petrochemicals Corporation Limited, Bharat Aluminium Company and Hindustan Zinc. This gradual process allows for the implementation of efficiency-enhancing reforms that complement privatization, a feature missing from similar privatization efforts in Latin America and Eastern Europe.

The consensus now is in favor of establishing an institutional framework conducive to promoting competition before privatizing firms. Gradual privatization also gives governments time to adjust price controls and subsidies without which privatization is unlikely to yield the anticipated improvements in efficiency and resource allocation.

Finally, the lag in time allows for the creation of regulatory agencies like the TRAI (telecom), SEBI (capital markets), TAMP (ports) and CERC (power) that are positioned to prevent some of the excesses that lead to the recent global recession.

On the micro-level, this gradual emphasis on privatization has pushed entrepreneurs to the center stage of India's economic growth. A sharp contrast from China's state run economic model where only 10% of credit goes to the private sector, India's economic growth in the past 20 years has been marked by high levels of private entrepreneurship. Over 80% of loans across the country go to private sector players. In 2002, the Global Entrepreneurship Monitor Report listed India as 2nd in terms of total entrepreneurship activity, though it ranks much higher in necessity based entrepreneurship as opposed to opportunity based entrepreneurship.

== Domestic demand-driven and service-dominated ==
One of the most unusual features of the Indian economic development model has been that India's GDP growth has been driven by domestic demand and consumption. From 1980 to 2002, India's economy grew at 6% per year and at 7.5% from 2002 to 2006. Today, domestic consumption accounts for 64% of India's GDP as opposed to 58% for Europe, 55% for Japan and 42% for China. Morgan Stanley's Stephen Roach comments that “India’s consumption-led approach to growth may be better balanced than the resource-mobilization model of China.”

Booming domestic demand and consumption has allowed Indian firms to diversify from export-led growth and hedge against global fluctuations in consumer demand as well as has created a vibrant middle class in India, of almost 250 million people. One of the most potent critiques of the Washington Consensus-based economic development model is that it does not cater to the middle class and creates widening gaps between the richest and poorest in the economy. While India is still a hugely unequal country, its Gini coefficient is 33 on a scale of 0–100, as compared to 41 for the US, 45 for China and 59 for Brazil. A large component of this reduced income inequality is due to India's growth being driven by domestic demand and consumption by the middle class.

Another extremely unusual feature of the Indian model is that it has not followed Rostow's traditional model of moving from an agrarian economy to a low-skilled manufacturing economy to high-tech manufacturing and finally, a service economy. While China's success has largely been based on moving from an agrarian economy to mass manufacturing of cheap goods that are exported to the West, India has almost skipped the middle step of creating a strong manufacturing base and directly invested in becoming a service economy. While there are strong manufacturing industries in India, a lot of them are concentrated around high-tech manufacturing. Propelled by the availability of skilled human capital, India's services sector has grown at 7.5% from 1991 to 2000 and now consists of 55% of India's GDP. Information technology and business process outsourcing are among the fastest growing sectors, having a cumulative growth rate of revenue 33.6% between 1997–98 and 2002–03 and contributing to 25% of the country's total exports in 2007–08.

The growth in the IT sector is attributed to increased specialization, and an availability of a large pool of low cost, highly skilled, educated and fluent English-speaking workers, on the supply side, matched on the demand side by increased demand from foreign consumers interested in India's service exports, or those looking to outsource their operations. The share of the Indian IT industry in the country's GDP increased from 4.8% in 2005–06 to 7% in 2008. In 2009, seven Indian firms were listed among the top 15 technology outsourcing companies in the world.

== Non-expansionist, internationally status quo-ist geopolitical strategy ==
Since gaining independence, India has maintained a strong neutral stance on global geopolitical shifts, especially the Cold War, that have both hindered and assisted their economic development. Post-independence in 1947, Indian foreign policy was fundamentally dependent on Jawaharlal Nehru, whose views were largely internally focused. Nehru valued Indian territorial sovereignty and realized the need for an adequate defense of this sovereignty, but otherwise, was largely of the view that India's economic development needed to be internally focused. After having been the victim of British mercantilist trade policies for centuries, Nehru and Mahatma Gandhi both stressed the need for autarkic indigenous industrialization and independence from the Great Powers of the time.

Nehru, along with Abdel Nasser in Egypt and Joseph Tito in Yugoslavia, were champions of the Non-Aligned Movement, that sought to maintain neutrality in the Cold War. In the 1960s and 1970s, New Delhi's international position among developed and developing countries faded in the course of wars with China and Pakistan, disputes with other countries in South Asia, and India's attempt to balance Pakistan's support from the United States and China by signing the Treaty of Peace, Friendship, and Cooperation with the Soviet Union in August 1971. Although India obtained substantial Soviet military and economic aid, India's influence was undercut regionally and internationally by the perception that its friendship with the Soviet Union prevented a more forthright condemnation of the Soviet presence in Afghanistan. In the 1980s, New Delhi improved relations with the United States, other developed countries, and China while continuing close ties with the Soviet Union. Relations with its South Asian neighbors, especially Pakistan, Sri Lanka, and Nepal, occupied much of the energies of the Ministry of External Affairs.

There are examples where India did not seek an internationally status quoist geopolitical strategy, specifically in their pursuit and attainment of nuclear weapon state status. In response to aggressive overtures from both Pakistan and earlier nuclear-armed China, the pursuit of nuclear weapons in India was as much a security concern as one of international prestige. To date, India has not signed the Nuclear Non-Proliferation Treaty and was the first state to receive exemptions from the treaty in 2011 (U.S.-India Civil Nuclear Agreement), allowing for the resumption of nuclear material commerce between India and the world.

Post-Cold War, the 1991 economic liberalizing reforms have forced India to reevaluate their non-expansionist geopolitical strategy. The end of the Cold War led to a departure from non-alignment - pragmatic security, economic considerations, and domestic political influences reinforced New Delhi's reliance on the United States and other developed countries. This caused New Delhi to abandon its anti-Israeli policy in the Middle East and resulted in the courtship of the Central Asian republics and the newly industrializing economies of East and Southeast Asia.

== Areas to Improve ==
Gurcharan Das comments that there are still sectors of the Indian economy, and thus Indian development, that need a lot of work. A legacy of the Gandhian peasant farmer ideal, the Indian agricultural sector is unmodernized and hindered by a vast system of regulations and protection. Das believes India needs to shift focus from peasant farming to agribusiness and encourage private capital to move from urban to rural areas. There is also a need to lift onerous distribution controls and allow large retailers to contract directly with farmers. Greater investment in irrigation infrastructure and advanced farming methods will follow from the consolidation of fragmented holdings.

Das points to electrical utility coverage and reliability, an extremely complicated tax regime that creates incentives for tax evasion, and a woefully inadequate public education system as some of the other areas that require dire attention and much greater investment from the Indian government.

== See also ==
- Bombay Plan
- Asian Century
- Beijing Consensus
- Development economics
- Globalism
- India–United States relations
- Kerala model
- Potential superpower
- Washington Consensus
