= Cristóbal Kay =

Cristóbal Kay is a Latin American development studies scholar. He is Professor Emeritus at the International Institute of Social Studies (ISS). He previously worked at the School of Oriental and African Studies (SOAS) and the University of Glasgow. He has been an editor of both the Journal of Agrarian Change, and the European Journal of Development Research. His main contributions have been in the areas of rural political social economy often with a Latin American focus.

Kay's PhD in Development Studies was awarded by the University of Sussex in 1971 and his prior studies were in the Department of Economics at the University of Chile completed in 1967.

== Selected publications ==
- Kay, C. (1989). Latin American theories of development and underdevelopment. Routledge.
- Kay, Cristóbal. (2015) "The agrarian question and the neoliberal rural transformation in Latin America." European Review of Latin American and Caribbean Studies/Revista Europea de Estudios Latinoamericanos y del Caribe: 73-83.
- Kay, C. (2002). Why East Asia overtook Latin America: agrarian reform, industrialisation and development. Third world quarterly, 23(6), 1073-1102.
- Kay, C. (1974). Comparative development of the European manorial system and the Latin American hacienda system. The Journal of Peasant Studies, 2(1), 69-98.
