= Cradle of civilization =

Locations where civilization emerged

A cradle of civilization is a location and a culture from which each of the earliest human civilizations developed independently of each other and subsequently emerged. A civilization is any complex society characterized by the development of a state, social stratification, urbanization, and symbolic systems of communication beyond signed or spoken languages (namely, writing systems and graphic arts).

Scholars generally acknowledge six cradles of civilization: Mesopotamia, Ancient Egypt, Ancient India and Ancient China are believed to be the earliest in Afro-Eurasia, while the Caral–Supe civilization of coastal Peru and the Olmec civilization of Mexico are believed to be the earliest in the Americas. All of the cradles of civilization depended upon agriculture for sustenance (except possibly Caral–Supe which may have depended initially on marine resources). All depended upon farmers producing an agricultural surplus to support the centralized government, political leaders, religious leaders, and public works of the urban centers of the early civilizations.

== Rise of civilization ==
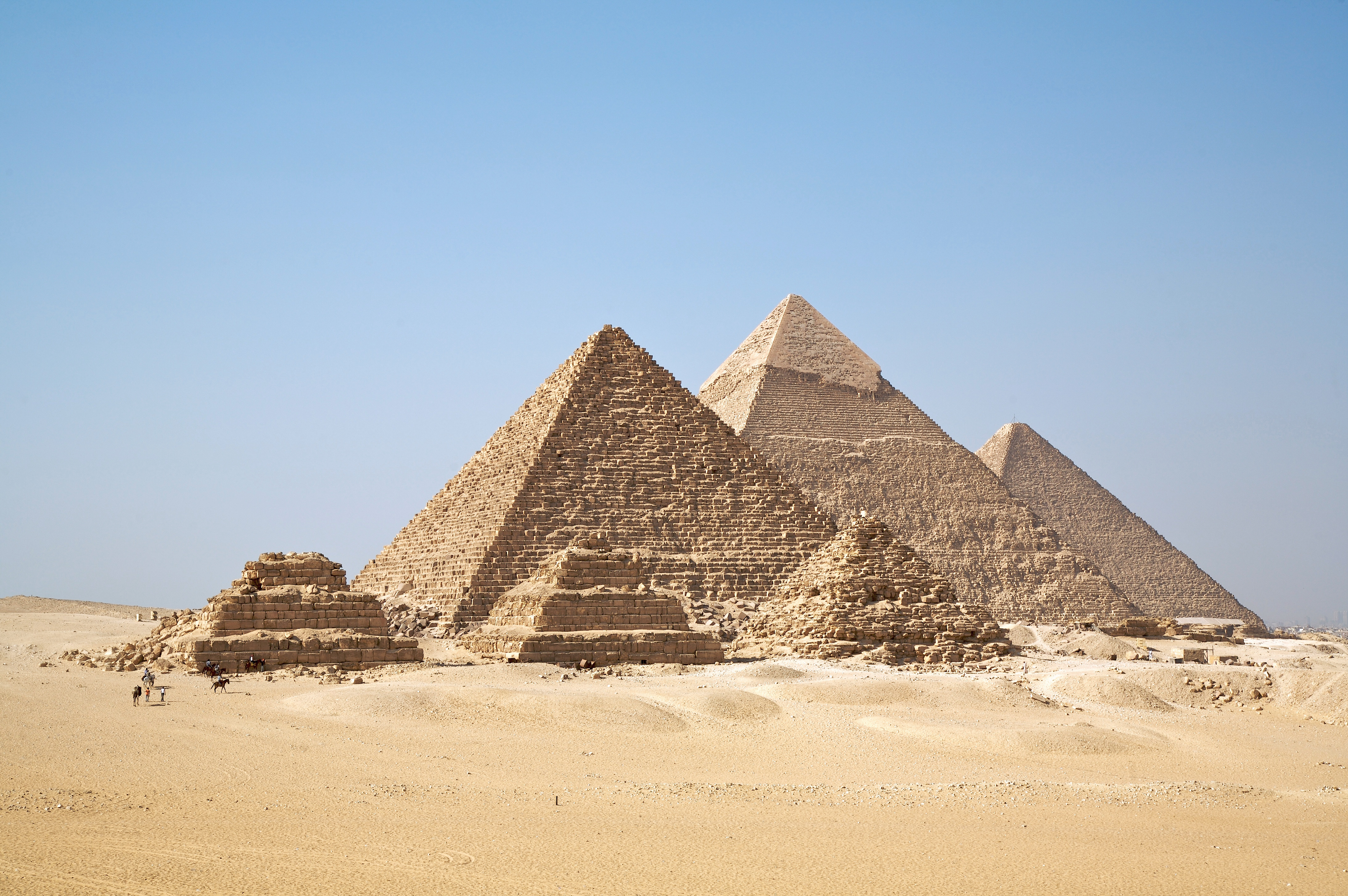
Among the various cradles of civilization is Ancient Egypt. Pictured are the Giza Pyramids.

The earliest signs of a process leading to sedentary culture can be seen in the Levant as early as 12,000 BC, when the Natufian culture became sedentary; it evolved into an agricultural society by 10,000 BC. The importance of water to safeguard an abundant and stable food supply, due to favourable conditions for hunting, fishing and gathering resources including cereals, provided an initial wide spectrum economy that triggered the creation of permanent villages.

The earliest proto-urban settlements with several thousand inhabitants emerged in the Neolithic which began in Western Asia in 10,000 BC. The first cities to house several tens of thousands were Uruk, Ur, Kish and Eridu in Mesopotamia, followed by Susa in Elam and Memphis in Egypt, all by the 31st century BC (see Historical urban community sizes).

Historic times are marked apart from prehistoric times when "records of the past begin to be kept for the benefit of future generations"—in written or oral form. If the rise of civilization is taken to coincide with the development of writing out of proto-writing, then the Near Eastern Chalcolithic (the transitional period between the Neolithic and the Bronze Age during the 4th millennium BC) and the development of proto-writing in Harappa in the Indus Valley of South Asia around 3,300 BC are the earliest instances, followed by Chinese proto-writing evolving into the oracle bone script, and again by the emergence of Mesoamerican writing systems from about 900 BC.

In the absence of written documents, most aspects of the rise of early civilizations are contained in archaeological assessments that document the development of formal institutions and the material culture. A "civilized" way of life is ultimately linked to conditions coming almost exclusively from agriculture. Gordon Childe defined the development of civilization as the result of two successive revolutions: the Neolithic Revolution of Western Asia, triggering the development of settled communities, and the urban revolution which also first emerged in Western Asia, which enhanced tendencies towards dense settlements, specialized occupational groups, social classes, exploitation of surpluses, monumental public buildings and writing. Few of those conditions, however, are unchallenged by the records: dense cities were not attested in Egypt's Old Kingdom (unlike Mesopotamia) and cities had a dispersed population in the Maya area; the Incas lacked writing although they could keep records with Quipus which might also have had literary uses; and often monumental architecture preceded any indication of village settlement. For instance, in present-day Louisiana, researchers have determined that cultures that were primarily nomadic organized over generations to build earthwork mounds at seasonal settlements as early as 3400 BC. Rather than a succession of events and preconditions, the rise of civilization could equally be hypothesized as an accelerated process that started with incipient agriculture and culminated in the Oriental Bronze Age.

== Single or multiple cradles ==
Scholars once thought that civilization began in the Fertile Crescent and spread out from there by influence. Scholars now believe that civilizations arose independently at several locations in both hemispheres. They have observed that sociocultural developments occurred along different timeframes. "Sedentary" and "nomadic" communities continued to interact considerably; they were not strictly divided among widely different cultural groups. The concept of a cradle of civilization focuses on the peoples who built cities, created writing systems, experimented with pottery and using metals techniques, domesticate animals, and developed complex social structures involving class systems.

Today, scholarship generally identifies six areas where civilization emerged independently: the Fertile Crescent, including Mesopotamia and the Levant; the Nile Valley in Northeast Africa; the Indo-Gangetic Plain; the North China Plain; the Andean Coast; and the Mesoamerican Gulf Coast.

== Original six ==
=== Fertile Crescent ===
The Fertile Crescent in 7500 BC. The red squares designate farming villages.

The Fertile Crescent comprises a crescent-shaped region of elevated terrain in West Asia, encompassing regions of modern-day Egypt, Palestine, Israel, Lebanon, Syria, Jordan, Turkey, and Iraq, extending to the Zagros Mountains in Iran. It stands as one of the earliest regions globally where agricultural practices emerged, marking the advent of sedentary farming communities.

By 10,200 BC, fully developed Neolithic cultures, characterized by the Pre-Pottery Neolithic A (PPNA) and Pre-Pottery Neolithic B (7600 to 6000 BC) phases, emerged within the Fertile Crescent. These cultures diffused eastward into South Asia and westward into Europe and North Africa. Among the notable PPNA settlements is Jericho, located in the Jordan Valley, believed to be the world's earliest established city, with initial settlement dating back to around 9600 BC and fortification occurring around 6800 BC.

Current theories and findings identify the Fertile Crescent as the first and oldest cradle of civilization. Examples of sites in this area are the early Neolithic site of Göbekli Tepe (9500–8000 BC) and Çatalhöyük (7500–5700 BC).

==== Mesopotamia ====
Major Sumerian cities during the Ubaid period

In Mesopotamia (a region encompassing modern Iraq and bordering regions of Southeast Turkey, Northeast Syria and Northwest Iran), the convergence of the Tigris and Euphrates rivers produced rich fertile soil and a supply of water for irrigation. Neolithic cultures emerged in the region from 8000 BC onwards. The civilizations that emerged around these rivers are the earliest known non-nomadic agrarian societies. It is because of this that the Fertile Crescent region, and Mesopotamia in particular, are often referred to as the cradle of civilization. The period known as the Ubaid period (c. 6500 to 3800 BC) is the earliest known period on the alluvial plain, although it is likely earlier periods exist obscured under the alluvium. It was during the Ubaid period that the movement toward urbanization began. Agriculture and animal husbandry were widely practiced in sedentary communities, particularly in Northern Mesopotamia (later Assyria), and intensive irrigated hydraulic agriculture began to be practiced in the south.

Around 6000 BC, Neolithic settlements began to appear all over Egypt. Studies based on morphological, genetic, and archaeological data have attributed these settlements to migrants from the Fertile Crescent in the Near East arriving in Egypt and North Africa during the Egyptian and North African Neolithic Revolution and bringing agriculture to the region. Tell el-'Oueili is the oldest Sumerian site settled during this period, around 5400 BC, and the city of Ur also first dates to the end of this period. In the south, the Ubaid period lasted from around 6500 to 3800 BC.

Sumerian civilization coalesced in the subsequent Uruk period (4000 to 3100 BC). Named after the Sumerian city of Uruk, this period saw the emergence of urban life in Mesopotamia and, during its later phase, the gradual emergence of the cuneiform script. Proto-writing in the region dates to around 3800 BC, with the earliest texts dating to 3300 BC; early cuneiform writing emerged in 3000 BC. It was also during this period that pottery painting declined as copper started to become popular, along with cylinder seals. Sumerian cities during the Uruk period were probably theocratic and were most likely headed by a priest-king (ensi), assisted by a council of elders, including both men and women. It is quite possible that the later Sumerian pantheon was modeled upon this political structure.

The Jemdet Nasr period, which is generally dated from 3100 to 2900 BC and succeeds the Uruk period, is known as one of the formative stages in the development of the cuneiform script. The oldest clay tablets come from Uruk and date to the late fourth millennium BC, slightly earlier than the Jemdet Nasr Period. By the time of the Jemdet Nasr Period, the script had already undergone a number of significant changes. It originally consisted of pictographs, but by the time of the Jemdet Nasr Period it was already adopting simpler and more abstract designs. It is also during this period that the script acquired its iconic wedge-shaped appearance.

Uruk trade networks started to expand to other parts of Mesopotamia and as far as North Caucasus, and strong signs of governmental organization and social stratification began to emerge, leading to the Early Dynastic Period (c. 2900 BC). After the Early Dynastic period began, there was a shift in control of the city-states from the temple establishment headed by council of elders led by a priestly "En" (a male figure when it was a temple for a goddess, or a female figure when headed by a male god) towards a more secular Lugal (Lu = man, Gal = great). The Lugals included such legendary patriarchal figures as Enmerkar, Lugalbanda and Gilgamesh, who supposedly reigned shortly before the historic record opens around 2700 BC, when syllabic writing started to develop from the early pictograms. The center of Sumerian culture remained in southern Mesopotamia, even though rulers soon began expanding into neighboring areas. Neighboring Semitic groups, including the Akkadian speaking Semites (Assyrians, Babylonians) who lived alongside the Sumerians in Mesopotamia, adopted much of Sumerian culture for their own. The earliest ziggurats began near the end of the Early Dynastic Period, although architectural precursors in the form of raised platforms date back to the Ubaid period. The Sumerian King List dates to the early second millennium BC. It consists of a succession of royal dynasties from different Sumerian cities, ranging back into the Early Dynastic Period. Each dynasty rises to prominence and dominates the region, only to be replaced by the next. The document was used by later Mesopotamian kings to legitimize their rule. While some of the information in the list can be checked against other texts such as economic documents, much of it is probably purely fictional, and its use as a historical document is limited.

Eannatum, the Sumerian king of Lagash, established the first verifiable empire in history in 2500 BC. The neighboring Elam, in modern Iran, was also part of the early urbanization during the Chalcolithic period. Elamite states were among the leading political forces of the Ancient Near East. The emergence of Elamite written records from around 3200 BC also parallels Sumerian history, where slightly earlier records have been found. During the 3rd millennium BC, there developed a very intimate cultural symbiosis between the Sumerians and the Akkadians. Akkadian language gradually replaced Sumerian as a spoken language somewhere between the 3rd and the 2nd millennia BC. The Semitic-speaking Akkadian Empire emerged around 2350 BC under Sargon the Great. The Akkadian Empire reached its political peak between the 24th and 22nd centuries BC. Under Sargon and his successors, the Akkadian language was briefly imposed on neighboring conquered states such as Elam and Gutium. After the fall of the Akkadian Empire and the overthrow of the Gutians, there was a brief reassertion of Sumerian dominance in Mesopotamia under the Third Dynasty of Ur. After the final collapse of Sumerian hegemony in Mesopotamia around 2004 BC, the Semitic Akkadian people of Mesopotamia eventually coalesced into two major Akkadian-speaking nations: Assyria in the north (whose earliest kings date to the 25th century BC), and, a few centuries later, Babylonia in the south, both of which (Assyria in particular) would go on to form powerful empires between the 20th and 6th centuries BC. The Sumerians were eventually absorbed into the Semitic Assyrian-Babylonian population.

=== Northeastern Africa ===
The region is intermediate between North Africa and East Africa, and encompasses the Horn of Africa (Djibouti, Eritrea, Ethiopia, and Somalia), as well as Sudan, South Sudan, Libya, and Egypt. The region has been inhabited for a long period, yielding fossils from early hominids to modern humans, and ranks among the world's most culturally and linguistically diverse areas, hosting numerous civilizations along an important trade route linking several continents.

A range of linguistic, biological anthropological, archaeological and genetic data have identified shared affinities between early Egypt and northeastern African populations. Genetic evidence has identified the Horn of Africa as a source of a genetic marker "M35/215" Y-chromosome lineage for a significant population component which moved north from that region into Egypt and the Levant. This genetic distribution paralleled the spread of the Afrasian language family with the movement of people from the Horn of Africa into Egypt and added a new demic component to the existing population of Egypt 17,000 years ago.

Mainstream scholars have situated the ethnicity and the origins of predynastic, southern Egypt as a foundational community primarily in northeast Africa which included the Sudan, tropical Africa and the Sahara whilst recognising the population variability that became characteristic of the pharaonic period. Pharaonic Egypt featured a physical gradation across the regional populations, with Upper Egyptians having shared more biological affinities with Sudanese and southernly African populations, whereas Lower Egyptians had closer genetic links with Levantine and Mediterranean populations.

Archaeological evidence has suggested that the Ancient Egyptian counting system had origins in Sub-Saharan Africa. Also, fractal geometry designs which are widespread among Sub-Saharan African cultures are also found in Egyptian architecture and cosmological signs. The Ishango bone, according to scholar Alexander Marshack, may have influenced the later development of mathematics in Egypt as, like some entries on the Ishango bone, Egyptian arithmetic also made use of multiplication by 2; this however, is disputed. Megalithic structures located in Nabta Playa, Upper Egypt featured astronomy, calendar arrangements in alignment with the heliacal rising of Sirius and supported calibration the yearly calendar for the annual Nile flood. These practices have been linked with the emergence of cosmology in Old Kingdom Egypt.

Ancient Nubians pioneered early antibiotics and established a system of geometrics which served as the basis for initial sunclocks. Nubians also exercised a trigonometric methodology comparable to their Egyptian counterparts.

The area comprising Somaliland, Somalia, Djibouti, the Red Sea coast of Eritrea and Sudan is considered the most likely location of the land known to the ancient Egyptians as Punt (or "Ta Netjeru", meaning god's land), whose first mention dates to the 25th century BC. The Puntites traded myrrh, spices, gold, ebony, short-horned cattle, ivory and frankincense with the Ancient Egyptians, Phoenicians, Babylonians, Indians, Chinese and Romans through their commercial ports. An Ancient Egyptian expedition sent to Punt by the 18th dynasty Queen Hatshepsut is recorded on the temple reliefs at Deir el-Bahari, during the reign of the Puntite King Parahu and Queen Ati. According to Christiane Noblecourt, these expeditions were further facilitated by the existence of a common language between Egypt and Punt.

==== Ancient Egypt ====
Map of ancient Egypt, showing major cities and sites of the Dynastic period (c. 3150 BC to 30 BC)

The developed Neolithic cultures belonging to the phases Pre-Pottery Neolithic A (10,200 BC) and Pre-Pottery Neolithic B (7600 to 6000 BC) appeared in the Fertile Crescent and from there spread eastwards and westwards. Contemporaneously, a grain-grinding culture using the earliest type of sickle blades had replaced the culture of hunters, fishers, and gathering people using stone tools along the Nile. Geological evidence and computer climate modeling studies also suggest that natural climate changes around 8000 BC began to desiccate the extensive pastoral lands of northern Africa, eventually forming the Sahara. Continued desiccation forced the early ancestors of the Egyptians to settle around the Nile more permanently and to adopt a more sedentary lifestyle. The oldest fully developed neolithic culture in Egypt is Fayum A culture that began around 5500 BC.

By about 5500 BC, small tribes living in the Nile valley had developed into a series of inter-related cultures as far south as Sudan, demonstrating firm control of agriculture and animal husbandry, and identifiable by their pottery and personal items, such as combs, bracelets, and beads. The largest of these early cultures in northern Upper Egypt was the Badari, which probably originated in the Western Desert; it was known for its high quality ceramics, stone tools, and use of copper. The oldest known domesticated bovine in Africa are from Fayum dating to around 4400 BC. The Badari cultures was followed by the Naqada culture, which brought a number of technological improvements. As early as the first Naqada Period, Amratia, Egyptians imported obsidian from Ethiopia, used to shape blades and other objects from flakes. By 3300 BC, just before the first Egyptian dynasty, Egypt was divided into two kingdoms, known as Upper Egypt to the south, and Lower Egypt to the north.

Egyptian civilization begins during the second phase of the Naqada culture, known as the Gerzeh period, around 3500 BC and coalesces with the unification of Upper and Lower Egypt around 3150 BC. Farming produced the vast majority of food; with increased food supplies, the populace adopted a much more sedentary lifestyle, and the larger settlements grew to cities of about 5,000 residents. It was in this time that the city dwellers started using mud brick to build their cities, and the use of the arch and recessed walls for decorative effect became popular. Copper instead of stone was increasingly used to make tools and weaponry. Symbols on Gerzean pottery also resemble nascent Egyptian hieroglyphs. Early evidence also exists of contact with the Near East, particularly Canaan and the Byblos coast, during this time. Concurrent with these cultural advances, a process of unification of the societies and towns of the upper Nile River, or Upper Egypt, occurred. At the same time the societies of the Nile Delta, or Lower Egypt, also underwent a unification process. During his reign in Upper Egypt, King Narmer defeated his enemies on the Delta and merged both the Kingdom of Upper and Lower Egypt under his single rule.

The Early Dynastic Period of Egypt immediately followed the unification of Upper and Lower Egypt. It is generally taken to include the First and Second Dynasties, lasting from the Naqada III archaeological period until about the beginning of the Old Kingdom, c. 2686 BC. With the First Dynasty, the capital moved from Thinis to Memphis with a unified Egypt ruled by a god-king. The hallmarks of ancient Egyptian civilization, such as art, architecture and many aspects of religion, took shape during the Early Dynastic period. The strong institution of kingship developed by the pharaohs served to legitimize state control over the land, labor, and resources that were essential to the survival and growth of ancient Egyptian civilization.

Major advances in architecture, art, and technology were made during the subsequent Old Kingdom, fueled by the increased agricultural productivity and resulting population, made possible by a well-developed central administration. Some of ancient Egypt's crowning achievements, the Giza pyramids and Great Sphinx, were constructed during the Old Kingdom. Under the direction of the vizier, state officials collected taxes, coordinated irrigation projects to improve crop yield and have senatorial essence over a justice system to maintain peace and order. Along with the rising importance of a central administration there arose a new class of educated scribes and officials who were granted estates by the pharaoh in payment for their services. Pharaohs also made land grants to their mortuary cults and local temples, to ensure that these institutions had the resources to worship the pharaoh after his death. Scholars believe that five centuries of these practices slowly eroded the economic power of the pharaoh, and that the economy could no longer afford to support a large centralized administration. As the power of the pharaoh diminished, regional governors called nomarchs began to challenge the supremacy of the pharaoh. This, coupled with severe droughts between 2200 and 2150 BC, is assumed to have caused the country to enter the 140-year period of famine and strife known as the First Intermediate Period.

=== Ancient India ===
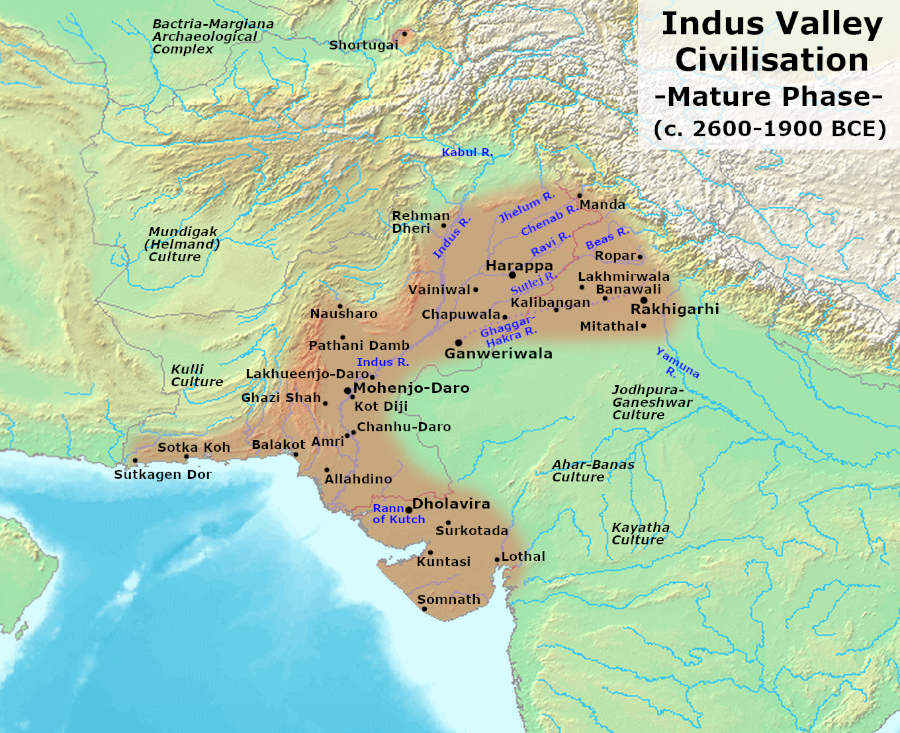
The Indus Valley Civilization at its greatest extent

The earliest reliably-dated Neolithic site in South Asia is Mehrgarh in the Kacchi Plain of present-day Pakistan dating from 7000 BC. (Note: Another site with reporting of early carbon datings is Bhirrana along the ancient Ghaggar-Hakra riverine system in the present day state of Haryana in India, dating to around 7600 BC, but this dating has been questioned as the cultural remains are of a more developed Chalcolithic-stage using 4th millennium BC ceramics. Other early sites include Lahuradewa in the Middle Ganges region and Jhusi near the confluence of Ganges and Yamuna rivers, both with reported carbon datings to around 7000 BC, though these dates have also been questioned. Dorian Fuller — an archaeobotanist — writes that: "Caution is warranted in considering early/mid-Holocene radiocarbon dates reported from this region [i.e., Ganges Plains]" which "dates would appear to be residual within their archaeological contexts, or represent very old wood", as earliest occupation was likely "intermittent" by hunter-gatherers, with earliest evidence of rice being "more suggestive of wild rice collecting". Fuller has concluded: "The unambiguous evidence for sedentary, agricultural villages after mid-third millennium and mainly after 2000 BC, as well as ceramic links, suggests that the Neolithic mainly of the later third millennium/early second millennium with possible origins in the earlier fourth millennium")

The aceramic Neolithic at Mehrgarh in present-day Pakistan lasts from 7000 to 5500 BC, with the ceramic Neolithic at Mehrgarh lasting up to 3300 BC; blending into the Early Bronze Age. Mehrgarh is one of the earliest sites with evidence of farming and herding in the Indian subcontinent. It is likely that the culture centered around Mehrgarh migrated into the Indus Valley in present-day Pakistan and became the Indus Valley Civilisation. The earliest fortified town in the region is found at Rehman Dheri, dated 4000 BC in Khyber Pakhtunkhwa close to River Zhob Valley in present-day Pakistan. Other fortified towns found to date are at Amri (3600–3300 BC), Kot Diji in Sindh, and at Kalibangan (3000 BC) at the Hakra River.

The Indus Valley Civilization starts around 3300 BC with what is referred to as the Early Harappan Phase (3300 to 2600 BC), although at the start this was still a village-based culture, leaving mostly pottery for archaeologists. The earliest examples of the Indus script date to this period, as well as the emergence of citadels representing centralised authority and an increasingly urban quality of life. Trade networks linked this culture with related regional cultures and distant sources of raw materials, including lapis lazuli and other materials for bead-making. By around 2600 BC, villagers had domesticated numerous crops, including peas, sesame seeds, dates, and cotton, as well as animals, including the water buffalo.

2600 to 1900 BC marks the Mature Harappan Phase during which Early Harappan communities turned into large urban centers including Harappa, Dholavira, Mohenjo-daro, Lothal, Rupar, and Rakhigarhi, and more than 1,000 towns and villages, often of relatively small size. Mature Harappans evolved new techniques in metallurgy and produced copper, bronze, lead, and tin and displayed advanced levels of engineering. As seen in Harappa, Mohenjo-daro and the recently partially excavated Rakhigarhi, this urban plan included the world's first known urban sanitation systems: see hydraulic engineering of the Indus Valley civilization. Within the city, individual homes or groups of homes obtained water from wells. From a room that appears to have been set aside for bathing, waste water was directed to covered drains, which lined the major streets. Houses opened only to inner courtyards and smaller lanes. The housebuilding in some villages in the region still resembles in some respects the housebuilding of the Harappans. The advanced architecture of the Harappans is shown by their impressive dockyards, granaries, warehouses, brick platforms, and protective walls. The massive walls of Indus cities most likely protected the Harappans from floods and may have dissuaded military conflicts.

The people of the Indus Civilization achieved great accuracy in measuring length, mass, and time. They were among the first to develop a system of uniform weights and measures. A comparison of available objects indicates large scale variation across the Indus territories. Their smallest division, which is marked on an ivory scale found in Lothal in Gujarat, was approximately 1.704 mm, the smallest division ever recorded on a scale of the Bronze Age. Harappan engineers followed the decimal division of measurement for all practical purposes, including the measurement of mass as revealed by their hexahedron weights. These chert weights were in a ratio of 5:2:1 with weights of 0.05, 0.1, 0.2, 0.5, 1, 2, 5, 10, 20, 50, 100, 200, and 500 units, with each unit weighing approximately 28 grams, similar to the English Imperial ounce or Greek uncia, and smaller objects were weighed in similar ratios with the units of 0.871. However, as in other cultures, actual weights were not uniform throughout the area. The weights and measures later used in Kautilya's Arthashastra (4th century BC) are the same as those used in Lothal.

Around 1800 BC, signs of a gradual decline began to emerge, and by around 1700 BC most of the cities had been abandoned. Suggested contributory causes for the localisation of the IVC include changes in the course of the river, and climate change that is also signaled for the neighbouring areas of the Middle East. As of 2016 many scholars believe that drought led to a decline in trade with Egypt and Mesopotamia contributing to the collapse of the Indus Civilization. The Ghaggar-Hakra system was rain-fed, (Note: Geological research by a group led by Peter Clift investigated how the courses of rivers have changed in this region since 8000 years ago, to test whether climate or river reorganisations caused the decline of the Harappan. Using U-Pb dating of zircon sand grains they found that sediments typical of the Beas, Sutlej and Yamuna rivers (Himalayan tributaries of the Indus) are actually present in former Ghaggar-Hakra channels. However, sediment contributions from these glacial-fed rivers stopped at least by 10,000 years ago, well before the development of the Indus civilization.) (Note: Tripathi et al. (2004) found that the isotopes of sediments carried by the Ghaggar-Hakra system over the last 20 thousand years do not come from the glaciated Higher Himalaya but have a sub-Himalayan source, and concluded that the river system was rain-fed. They also concluded that this contradicted the idea of a Harappan-time mighty "Sarasvati" river.) and water-supply depended on the monsoons. The Indus Valley climate grew significantly cooler and drier from about 1800 BC, linked to a general weakening of the monsoon at that time. The Indian monsoon declined and aridity increased, with the Ghaggar-Hakra retracting its reach towards the foothills of the Himalaya, leading to erratic and less extensive floods that made inundation agriculture less sustainable. Aridification reduced the water supply enough to cause the civilization's demise, and to scatter its population eastward. (Note: Broke: "The story in Harappan India was somewhat different (see Figure 111.3). The Bronze Age village and urban societies of the Indus Valley are some-thing of an anomaly, in that archaeologists have found little indication of local defense and regional warfare. It would seem that the bountiful monsoon rainfall of the Early to Mid-Holocene had forged a condition of plenty for all, and that competitive energies were channeled into commerce rather than conflict. Scholars have long argued that these rains shaped the origins of the urban Harappan societies, which emerged from Neolithic villages around 2600 BC. It now appears that this rainfall began to slowly taper off in the third millennium, at just the point that the Harappan cities began to develop. Thus it seems that this "first urbanisation" in South Asia was the initial response of the Indus Valley peoples to the beginning of Late Holocene aridification. These cities were maintained for 300 to 400 years and then gradually abandoned as the Harappan peoples resettled in scattered villages in the eastern range of their territories, into the Punjab and the Ganges Valley....' 17 (footnote): a)Liviu Giosan et al., "Fluvial Landscapes of the Harappan Civilization," PNAS, 102 (2012), E1688—E1694; (b) Camilo Ponton, "Holocene Aridification of India," GRL 39 (2012), L03704; (c) Harunur Rashid et al., "Late Glacial to Holocene Indian Summer Monsoon Variability Based upon Sediment Records Taken from the Bay of Bengal," Terrestrial, Atmospheric, and Oceanic Sciences 22 (2011), 215–28; (d) Marco Madella and Dorian Q. Fuller, "Paleoecology and the Harappan Civilization of South Asia: A Reconsideration," Quaternary Science Reviews 25 (2006), 1283–301. Compare with the very different interpretations in Possehl, Gregory L. (2002), The Indus Civilization: A Contemporary Perspective, Rowman Altamira, pp. 237–245, ISBN 978-0-7591-0172-2, and Michael Staubwasser et al., "Climate Change at the 4.2 ka BP Termination of the Indus Valley Civilization and Holocene South Asian Monsoon Variability," GRL 30 (2003), 1425. Bar-Matthews and Avner Ayalon, "Mid-Holocene Climate Variations.") As the monsoons kept shifting south, the floods grew too erratic for sustainable agricultural activities. The residents then migrated away into smaller communities. However trade with the old cities did not flourish. The small surplus produced in these small communities did not allow development of trade, and the cities died out. According to the Aryan Migration Theory, the Indo-Aryan peoples migrated into the Indus River Valley during this period and began the Vedic age of India. The Indus Valley Civilization did not disappear suddenly and many elements of the civilization continued in later Indian subcontinent and Vedic cultures.

=== Ancient China ===
Traditional Xia sites (red) and Erlitou sites (black) near the Yellow River

Drawing on archaeology, geology and anthropology, modern scholars do not see the origins of the Chinese civilization or history as a linear story but rather the history of the interactions of different and distinct cultures and ethnic groups that influenced each other's development. The specific cultural regions that developed Chinese civilization were the Yellow River civilization, the Yangtze civilization, and Liao civilization. Early evidence for Chinese millet agriculture is dated to around 7000 BC, with the earliest evidence of cultivated rice found at Chengtoushan near the Yangtze River, dated to 6500 BC. Chengtoushan may also be the site of the first walled city in China. By the beginning of the Neolithic Revolution, the Yellow River valley began to establish itself as a center of the Peiligang culture, which flourished from 7000 to 5000 BC, with evidence of agriculture, constructed buildings, pottery, and burial of the dead. With agriculture came increased population, the ability to store and redistribute crops, and the potential to support specialist craftsmen and administrators. Its most prominent site is Jiahu. Some scholars have suggested that the Jiahu symbols (6600 BC) are the earliest form of proto-writing in China. However, it is likely that they should not be understood as writing itself, but as features of a lengthy period of sign-use, which led eventually to a fully-fledged system of writing. Archaeologists believe that the Peiligang culture was egalitarian, with little political organization.

It eventually evolved into the Yangshao culture (5000 to 3000 BC), and their stone tools were polished and highly specialized. They may also have practiced an early form of silkworm cultivation. The main food of the Yangshao people was millet, with some sites using foxtail millet and others broomcorn millet, though some evidence of rice has been found. The exact nature of Yangshao agriculture, small-scale slash-and-burn cultivation versus intensive agriculture in permanent fields, is currently a matter of debate. Once the soil was exhausted, residents picked up their belongings, moved to new lands, and constructed new villages. However, Middle Yangshao settlements such as Jiangzhi contain raised-floor buildings that may have been used for the storage of surplus grains. Grinding stones for making flour were also found.

Later, Yangshao culture was superseded by the Longshan culture, which was also centered on the Yellow River from about 3000 to 1900 BC, its most prominent site being Taosi. The population expanded dramatically during the 3rd millennium BC, with many settlements having rammed earth walls. It decreased in most areas around 2000 BC until the central area evolved into the Bronze Age Erlitou culture. The earliest bronze artifacts have been found in the Majiayao culture site (3100 to 2700 BC).

Contemporary Chinese civilization begins during the second phase of the Erlitou period (1900 to 1500 BC), with Erlitou considered the first state level society of East Asia. There is considerable debate whether Erlitou sites correlate to the semi-legendary Xia dynasty. The Xia dynasty (2070 to 1600 BC) is the first dynasty to be described in ancient Chinese historical records such as the Bamboo Annals, first published more than a millennium later during the Western Zhou period. Although Xia is an important element in Chinese historiography, there is to date no contemporary written evidence to corroborate the dynasty. Erlitou saw an increase in bronze metallurgy and urbanization and was a rapidly growing regional center with palatial complexes that provide evidence for social stratification. The Erlitou civilization is divided into four phases, each of roughly 50 years. During Phase I, covering 100 hectares (250 acres), Erlitou was a rapidly growing regional center with estimated population of several thousand but not yet an urban civilization or capital. Urbanization began in Phase II, expanding to 300 ha (740 acres) with a population around 11,000. A palace area of 12 ha (30 acres) was demarcated by four roads. It contained the 150x50 m Palace 3, composed of three courtyards along a 150-meter axis, and Palace 5. A bronze foundry was established to the south of the palatial complex that was controlled by the elite who lived in palaces. The city reached its peak in Phase III, and may have had a population of around 24,000. The palatial complex was surrounded by a two-meter-thick rammed-earth wall, and Palaces 1, 7, 8, 9 were built. The earthwork volume of rammed earth for the base of largest Palace 1 is 20,000 m^{3} at least. Palaces 3 and 5 were abandoned and replaced by 4,200-square-meter (45,000 sq ft) Palace 2 and Palace 4. In Phase IV, the population decreased to around 20,000, but building continued. Palace 6 was built as an extension of Palace 2, and Palaces 10 and 11 were built. Phase IV overlaps with the Lower phase of the Erligang culture (1600–1450 BC). Around 1600 to 1560 BC, about 6 km northeast of Erlitou, a culturally Erligang walled city was built at Yanshi, which coincides with an increase in production of arrowheads at Erlitou. This situation might indicate that the Yanshi city was competing for power and dominance with Erlitou. Production of bronzes and other elite goods ceased at the end of Phase IV, at the same time as the Erligang city of Zhengzhou was established 85 km (53 mi) to the east. There is no evidence of destruction by fire or war, but, during the Upper Erligang phase (1450–1300 BC), all the palaces were abandoned, and Erlitou was reduced to a village of 30 ha (74 acres).

The earliest traditional Chinese dynasty for which there is both archeological and written evidence is the Shang dynasty (1600 to 1046 BC). Shang sites have yielded the earliest known body of Chinese writing, the oracle bone script, mostly divinations inscribed on bones. These inscriptions provide critical insight into many topics from the politics, economy, and religious practices to the art and medicine of this early stage of Chinese civilization. Some historians argue that Erlitou should be considered an early phase of the Shang dynasty. The U.S. National Gallery of Art defines the Chinese Bronze Age as the period between about 2000 and 771 BC; a period that begins with the Erlitou culture and ends abruptly with the disintegration of Western Zhou rule. The Sanxingdui culture is another Chinese Bronze Age society, contemporaneous to the Shang dynasty, however they developed a different method of bronze-making from the Shang.

=== Ancient Peru ===
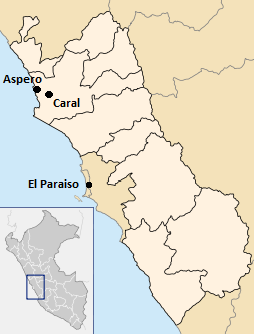
Map of Caral–Supe sites

The earliest evidence of agriculture in the Andean region dates to around 9000 BC in Ecuador at sites of the Las Vegas culture. The bottle gourd may have been the first plant cultivated. The oldest evidence of canal irrigation in South America dates to 4700 to 2500 BC in the Zaña Valley of northern Peru. The earliest urban settlements of the Andes, as well as North and South America, are dated to 3500 BC at Huaricanga, in the Fortaleza area, and Sechin Bajo near the Sechin River. Both sites are in Peru.

The Caral–Supe or Norte Chico civilization is understood to have emerged around 3200 BC, as it is at that point that large-scale human settlement and communal construction across multiple sites becomes apparent. In the early 21st century, Peruvian archaeologist Ruth Shady established Caral–Supe as the oldest known civilization in the Americas. The civilization flourished near the Pacific coast in the valleys of three small rivers, the Fortaleza, the Pativilca, and the Supe. These river valleys each have large clusters of sites. Further south, there are several associated sites along the Huaura River. Notable settlements include the cities of Caral, the largest and most complex Preceramic site, and Aspero. Caral-Supe is distinguished by its density of large sites with immense architecture. Haas argues that the density of sites in such a small area is globally unique for a nascent civilization. During the third millennium BC, Caral-Supe may have been the most densely populated area of the world (excepting, possibly, northern China). The Supe, Pativilca, Fortaleza, and Huaura River valleys each have several related sites.

Caral-Supe is unusual in that it completely lacked ceramics and apparently had almost no visual art. Nevertheless, the civilization exhibited impressive architectural feats, including large earthwork platform mounds and sunken circular plazas, and an advanced textile industry. The platform mounds, as well as large stone warehouses, provide evidence for a stratified society and a centralized authority necessary to distribute resources such as cotton. However, there is no evidence of warfare or defensive structures during this period. Originally, it was theorized that, unlike other early civilizations, Caral-Supe developed by relying on maritime food sources in place of a staple cereal. This hypothesis, the Maritime Foundation of Andean Civilization, is still hotly debated; however, most researches now agree that agriculture played a central role in the civilization's development while still acknowledging a strong supplemental reliance on maritime proteins.

The Caral-Supe chiefdoms were "...almost certainly theocratic, though not brutally so," according to Mann. Construction areas show possible evidence of feasting, which would have included music and likely alcohol, suggesting an elite able to both mobilize and reward the population. The degree of centralized authority is difficult to ascertain, but architectural construction patterns are indicative of an elite that, at least in certain places at certain times, wielded considerable power: while some of the monumental architecture was constructed incrementally, other buildings, such as the two main platform mounds at Caral, appear to have been constructed in one or two intense construction phases. As further evidence of centralized control, Haas points to remains of large stone warehouses found at Upaca, on the Pativilca, as emblematic of authorities able to control vital resources such as cotton. Economic authority would have rested on the control of cotton and edible plants and associated trade relationships, with power centered on the inland sites. Haas tentatively suggests that the scope of this economic power base may have extended widely: there are only two confirmed shore sites in the Caral-Supe (Aspero and Bandurria) and possibly two more, but cotton fishing nets and domesticated plants have been found up and down the Peruvian coast. It is possible that the major inland centers of Caral-Supe were at the center of a broad regional trade network centered on these resources.

Discover magazine, citing Shady, suggests a rich and varied trade life: "[Caral] exported its own products and those of Aspero to distant communities in exchange for exotic imports: Spondylus shells from the coast of Ecuador, rich dyes from the Andean highlands, hallucinogenic snuff from the Amazon." (Given the still limited extent of Caral-Supe research, such claims should be treated circumspectly.) Other reports on Shady's work indicate Caral traded with communities in the Andes and in the jungles of the Amazon basin on the opposite side of the Andes.

Leaders' ideological power was based on apparent access to deities and the supernatural. Evidence regarding Caral-Supe religion is limited: an image of the Staff God, a leering figure with a hood and fangs, has been found on a gourd dated to 2250 BC. The Staff God is a major deity of later Andean cultures, and Winifred Creamer suggests the find points to worship of common symbols of gods. As with much other research at Caral-Supe, the nature and significance of the find has been disputed by other researchers. (Note: Krysztof Makowski, as reported by Mann (1491), suggests there is little evidence that Andean civilizations worshipped an overarching deity. The figure may have been carved by a later civilization onto an ancient gourd, as it was found in strata dating between 900 and 1300 AD.) The act of architectural construction and maintenance may also have been a spiritual or religious experience: a process of communal exaltation and ceremony. Shady has called Caral "the sacred city" (la ciudad sagrada): socio-economic and political focus was on the temples, which were periodically remodeled, with major burnt offerings associated with the remodeling.

Bundles of strings uncovered at Caral-Supe sites have been identified as quipu, a type of pre-writing recording device. Quipu are thought to encode numeric information, but some have conjectured that quipu have been used to encode other forms of data, possibly including literary or musical applications. However, the exact use of quipu by the Caral-Supe and later Andean cultures has been widely debated. The presence of quipu and the commonality of religious symbols suggests a cultural link between Caral-Supe and later Andean cultures.

Circa 1800 BC, the Caral-Supe civilization began to decline, with more powerful centers appearing to the south and north along the coast and to the east inside the belt of the Andes. Pottery eventually developed in the Amazon Basin and spread to the Andean culture region around 2000 BC. The next major civilization to arise in the Andes would be the Chavín culture at Chavín de Huantar, located in the Andean highlands of the present-day Department of Ancash. It is believed to have been built around 900 BC and was the religious and political center of the Chavín people.

=== Mesoamerica ===
The Olmec heartland, where the Olmec reigned

Maize is believed to have been first domesticated in southern Mexico about 7000 BC. The Coxcatlan Caves in the Valley of Tehuacán provide evidence for agriculture in components dated between 5000 and 3400 BC. Similarly, sites such as Sipacate in Guatemala provide maize pollen samples dating to 3500 BC. Around 1900 BC, the Mokaya domesticated one of the dozen species of cacao. A Mokaya archaeological site provides evidence of cacao beverages dating to this time. The Mokaya are also thought to have been among the first cultures in Mesoamerica to develop a hierarchical society. What would become the Olmec civilization had its roots in early farming cultures of Tabasco, which began around 5100 to 4600 BC.

The emergence of the Olmec civilization has traditionally been dated to around 1600 to 1500 BC. Olmec features first emerged in the city of San Lorenzo Tenochtitlán, fully coalescing around 1400 BC. The rise of civilization was assisted by the local ecology of well-watered alluvial soil, as well as by the transportation network provided by the Coatzacoalcos River basin. This environment encouraged a densely concentrated population, which in turn triggered the rise of an elite class and an associated demand for the production of the symbolic and sophisticated luxury artifacts that define Olmec culture. Many of these luxury artifacts were made from materials such as jade, obsidian, and magnetite, which came from distant locations and suggest that early Olmec elites had access to an extensive trading network in Mesoamerica. The aspect of Olmec culture perhaps most familiar today is their artwork, particularly the Olmec colossal heads. San Lorenzo was situated in the midst of a large agricultural area. San Lorenzo seems to have been largely a ceremonial site, a town without city walls, centered in the midst of a widespread medium-to-large agricultural population. The ceremonial center and attendant buildings could have housed 5,500 while the entire area, including hinterlands, could have reached 13,000. It is thought that while San Lorenzo controlled much or all of the Coatzacoalcos basin, areas to the east (such as the area where La Venta would rise to prominence) and north-northwest (such as the Tuxtla Mountains) were home to independent polities. San Lorenzo was all but abandoned around 900 BC at about the same time that La Venta rose to prominence. A wholesale destruction of many San Lorenzo monuments also occurred circa 950 BC, which may indicate an internal uprising or, less likely, an invasion. The latest thinking, however, is that environmental changes may have been responsible for this shift in Olmec centers, with certain important rivers changing course.

La Venta became the cultural capital of the Olmec concentration in the region until its abandonment around 400 BC, constructing monumental architectural achievements such as the Great Pyramid of La Venta. It contained a "concentration of power", as reflected by the sheer enormity of the architecture and the extreme value of the artifacts uncovered. La Venta is perhaps the largest Olmec city and it was controlled and expanded by an extremely complex hierarchical system, with a king as the ruler and the elites below him. Priests had power and influence over life and death and likely great political sway as well. Unfortunately, not much is known about the political or social structure of the Olmec, though new dating techniques might, at some point, reveal more information about this elusive culture. It is possible that the signs of status exist in the artifacts recovered at the site such as depictions of feathered headdresses or of individuals wearing a mirror on their chest or forehead. "High-status objects were a significant source of power in the La Venta polity political power, economic power, and ideological power. They were tools used by the elite to enhance and maintain rights to rulership". It has been estimated that La Venta would need to be supported by a population of at least 18,000 people during its principal occupation. To add to the mystique of La Venta, the alluvial soil did not preserve skeletal remains, so it is difficult to observe differences in burials. However, colossal heads provide proof that the elite had some control over the lower classes, as their construction would have been extremely labor-intensive. "Other features similarly indicate that many laborers were involved". In addition, excavations over the years have discovered that different parts of the site were likely reserved for elites and other parts for non-elites. This segregation of the city indicates that there must have been social classes and therefore social inequality.

The exact cause of the decline of the Olmec culture is uncertain. Between 400 and 350 BC, the population in the eastern half of the Olmec heartland dropped precipitously. This depopulation was probably the result of serious environmental changes that rendered the region unsuited for large groups of farmers, in particular changes to the riverine environment that the Olmec depended upon for agriculture, hunting and gathering, and transportation. These changes may have been triggered by tectonic upheavals or subsidence, or the silting up of rivers due to agricultural practices. Within a few hundred years of the abandonment of the last Olmec cities, successor cultures became firmly established. The Tres Zapotes site, on the western edge of the Olmec heartland, continued to be occupied well past 400 BC, but without the hallmarks of the Olmec culture. This post-Olmec culture, often labeled Epi-Olmec, has features similar to those found at Izapa, some 550 km (330 miles) to the southeast.

The Olmecs are sometimes referred to as the mother culture of Mesoamerica, as they were the first Mesoamerican civilization and laid many of the foundations for the civilizations that followed. However, the causes and degree of Olmec influences on Mesoamerican cultures has been a subject of debate over many decades. Practices introduced by the Olmec include ritual bloodletting and the Mesoamerican ballgame, hallmarks of subsequent Mesoamerican societies such as the Maya and Aztec. Although the Mesoamerican writing system would fully develop later, early Olmec ceramics show representations that may be interpreted as codices.

== Cradle of Western civilization ==
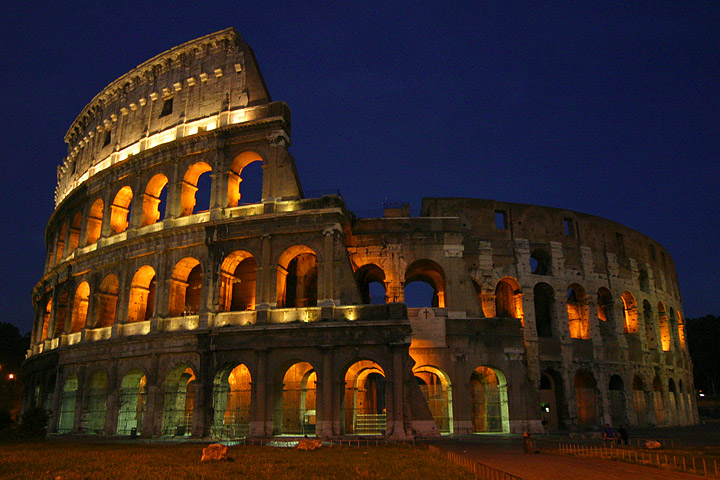
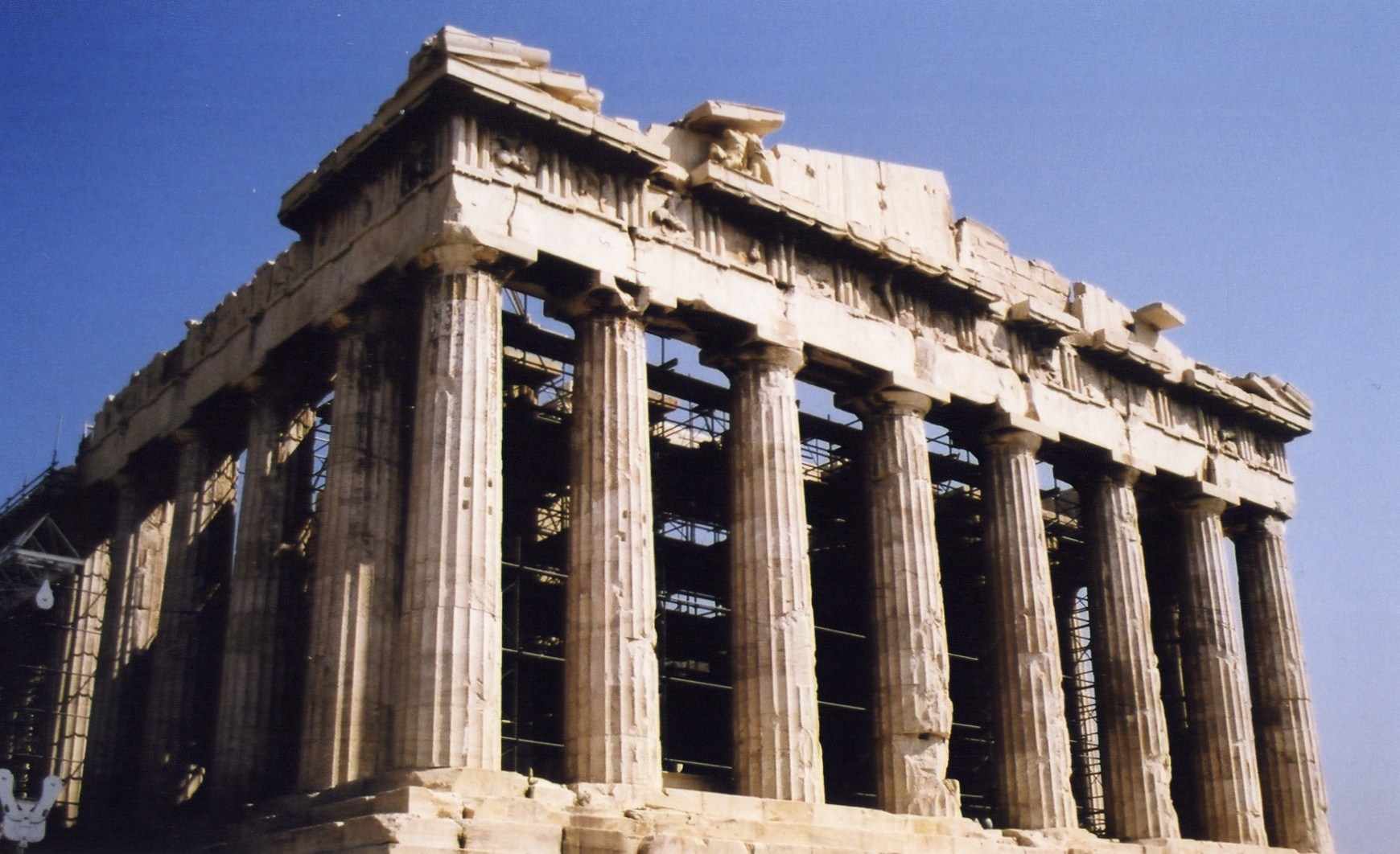
The Colosseum and the Acropolis, symbols of the Greco-Roman world. Via the Roman Empire, Greek culture spread throughout Europe.

There is academic consensus that Ancient Greece and Ancient Rome were major historical cultures that provided a foundation for modern Western culture because of the formative role they had in politics, administration, art, literature, theatre, architecture, ethics, metaphysics, epistemology, philosophy, republicanism, law, warfare, Western Christianity, Eastern Christianity, democracy, aesthetics, engineering, and science. For this reason, they are known as the cradles of Western Civilization.

== Other uses ==
Because the word civilization can be defined widely, the term "cradle of civilization" has also been used to describe the origin-point of a particular cultural group, or as the basis for a national mysticism or the origin myth of a nation. This is separate from the use of the term in the study of human prehistory and the development of complex, sedentary societies.

"Cradle of civilization" has been used in Indian nationalism (In Search of the Cradle of Civilization 1995) and Taiwanese nationalism (Taiwan;— The Cradle of Civilization 2002).

The terms also appear in esoteric pseudohistory, such as the Urantia Book, claiming the title for "the second Eden", or the pseudoarchaeology related to Megalithic Britain (Civilization One 2004, Ancient Britain: The Cradle of Civilization 1921).

== See also ==
- Chronology of the ancient Near East
- Cradle of Humankind
- Four Great Ancient Civilizations
- River valley civilization
- Human history
- Civilization state
- Skara Brae and Barnhouse Settlement
- Neolithic Revolution
- Old Europe (archaeology)
