= River valley civilization =

Classification of civilization

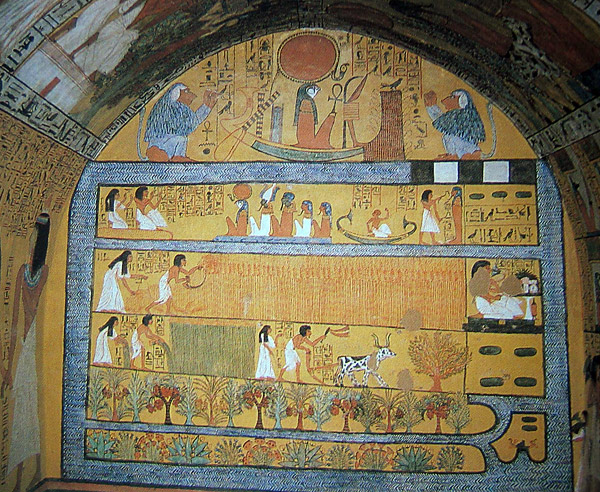
Photograph of the burial chamber of Sennedjem's tomb depicting the Field of Reeds in the afterlife

A River valley civilization is an agricultural civilization that is situated beside a river. Civilization develops from the river as it gives the inhabitants a reliable source of water for drinking and agriculture. The river also supports their livelihood through fishing, fertile soil from annual flooding, and ease of transportation.

== Overview ==
Civilizations thrive in river valleys for several reasons. One important reason is the easy access to a usually reliable source of water. The river's annual flood enriches the soil to sustain villages and produce excess crops. Another important reason is the facilitation of trade. Rivers provide an efficient way to transport people and goods, through which civilizations are able to develop trade to outlying areas. The benefits obtained from the river allow excess time for individuals to engage in non-agricultural activities, such as construction, metalworking, trade, and social organization.

== Some examples ==
- The Uruk period of Mesopotamia dates from about 4000 to 3100 BC, and provides the earliest signs of the existence of states in the Near East. Located along the Tigris and Euphrates rivers in West Asia, the name later given to that civilization, Mesopotamia, means "between rivers".
- The Nile valley in Egypt had been home to agricultural settlements as early as 5500 BCE, but the growth of Ancient Egypt as a civilization began around 3100 BCE.
- A third civilization grew up along the Indus River around 3300 BCE in parts of what are now India and Pakistan (see Bronze Age India).
- The fourth great river civilization emerged around 1700 BCE along the Yellow River in China.

== History ==
=== Early civilizations ===
==== Mesopotamia ====
Mesopotamia was one of the earliest river valley civilizations: it started to form around 4000 BCE. The civilization was created after regular trading relationships started between multiple cities and states around the Tigris and Euphrates Rivers. Mesopotamian cities became self-run civil governments. One of the cities within this civilization, Ur, was the first literate society in history. Eventually, they constructed irrigation systems to exploit the two rivers, transforming their dry land into an agriculturally productive area, allowing population growth throughout the cities and states within Mesopotamia.

==== Nile River ====
Ancient Egypt also created irrigation systems from its local river, the Nile River, more complex than previous systems. The Egyptians would rotate legumes with cereal, which would stop salt buildup from the freshwater and enhance the fertility of their fields. The Nile River also allowed easier travel, eventually resulting in the creation of two kingdoms in the north and south areas of the river until both were unified into one society by 3000 BCE.

==== Indus Valley ====
Much of the history of the Indus Valley Civilization is unknown. Discovered in the 1920s, Harappan society was larger than either Egypt or Mesopotamia. Historians have found no evidence of violence or a ruling class; there are no distinctive burial sites, and there is not a lot of evidence to suggest a formal military. Because the Harappan system of writing has not yet been deciphered, we know little about the ruling class and the military.

==== Yellow River ====
The Yellow River was settled in 9500 BCE. Many tribes settled along the river, sixth-longest in the world, which was distinguished by its heavy load of yellow silt and its periodic devastating floods. A major impetus for the tribes to unite into a single kingdom by around 1700 BCE (Erlitou culture, a Yellow River civilization) was the desire to find a solution to the frequent deadly floods. The Yellow River is often called "The Cradle of Chinese Civilization".

==== Supe Valley ====
Caral-Supe (also known as Caral and Norte Chico) was a complex pre-Columbian-era society that included as many as thirty major population centers in what is now the Caral region of north-central coastal Peru. The Caral–Supe civilization flourished between the fourth and second millennia BC, with the formation of the first city generally dated to around 3500 BC, at Huaricanga, in the Fortaleza area. Large-scale human settlement and communal construction from 3100 BC onward is clearly apparent; it lasted until a period of decline around 1800 BC. Since the early 21st century, it has been established as the oldest-known civilization in the Americas, and as one of the six sites where civilisation separately originated in the ancient world.

== See also ==
- Hydraulic empire
- Ancient Egypt
- Mesopotamia
- Meluhha
- Cradle of civilization

== Sources ==
- Cole, Adrian; Ortega, Stephen (2014). The Thinking Past: Questions and Problems in World History to 1750. OUP. ISBN 978-0199794621.
