= Prehistory of China =

The earliest human occupation of what is now China dates to the Lower Paleolithic c. 1.7 million years ago—attested by archaeological finds such as the Yuanmou Man. The Erlitou (c. 1900 – c. 1500 BCE) and Erligang cultures (c. 1600 – c. 1400 BCE) inhabiting the Yellow River valley were Bronze Age civilizations predating the historical record—which first emerges c. 1250 BCE at Yinxu, during the Late Shang.

== Paleolithic ==
The Paleolithic period in palaeogeography refers to the stage of civilization development in which humans began to use stone tools as their main means of labor, and is the early stage of the Stone Age. This period is generally defined as from about 2.6 million or 2.5 million years ago (the first production of stone tools by archaic humans) to 12,000 years ago (the emergence of agricultural civilization). The division of this period is generally threefold: the Lower, Middle, and Upper Paleolithic, followed by the Mesolithic.

Paleolithic humans usually lived together in tribes and subsisted by collecting plants and hunting wildlife. Although humans also used wooden and bone tools within this era, the Paleolithic period is typified by the use of stone tools made by hammering stones. Other materials, such as leather and plant fibers, are also suitable for tooling, but the nature of these materials has prevented them from being used in a wider range of applications. During the Paleolithic period, humans evolved dramatically from early Homo sapiens to anatomically modern humans. During the latter stages of the Paleolithic humans began to create the earliest art and became involved in religious and spiritual realms, such as funerals and rituals.

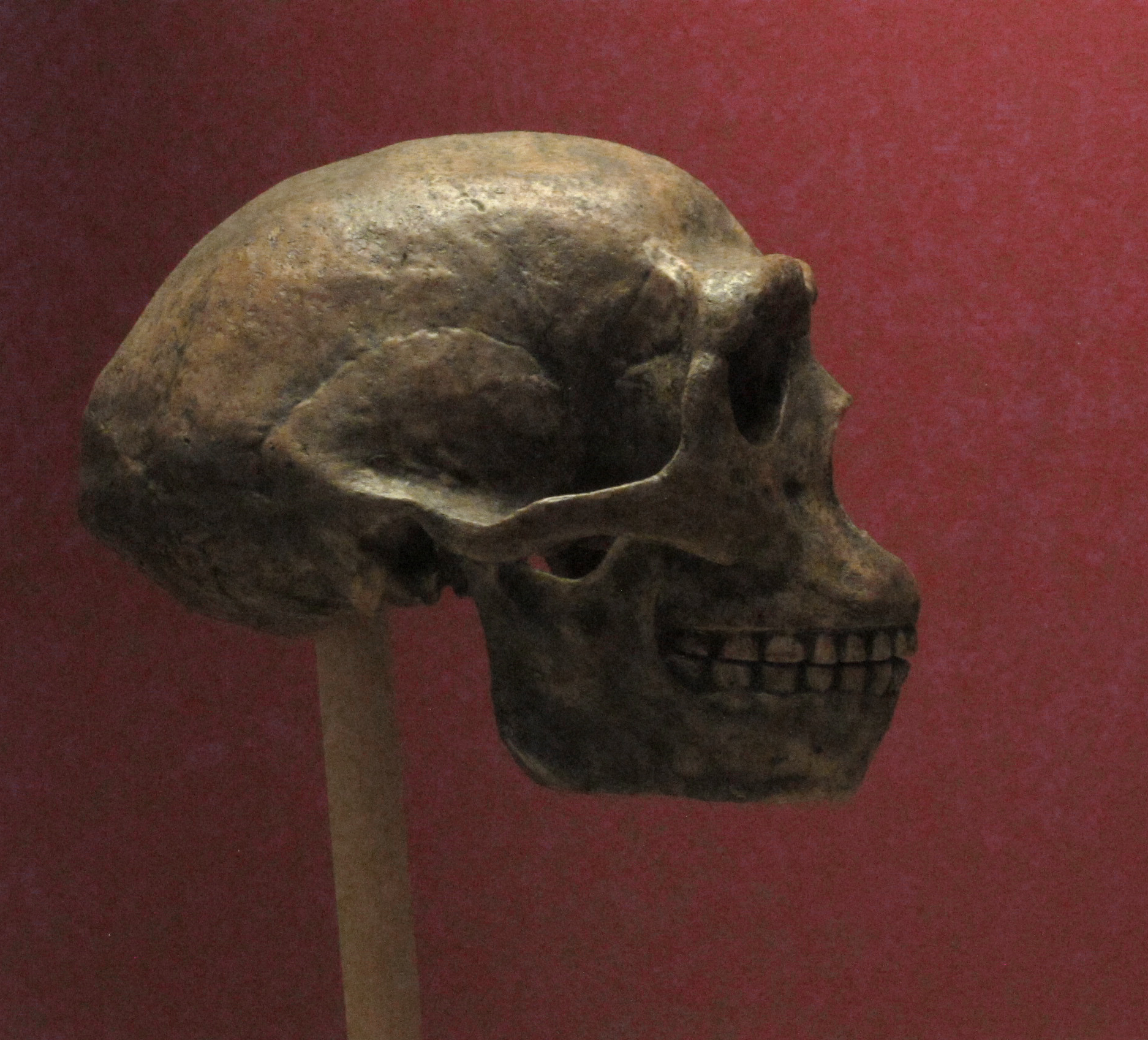
Reconstruction of Peking Man at the American Museum of Natural History, New York.

=== Early period ===
The distribution of early Paleolithic cultures in China has been widespread. Chinese Paleolithic cultures dating back to 1 million years BP include the Xihoudou Culture, the Yuanmou Man stone tools, the Kehe Culture, the Lantian Human Culture, and the Donggutuo site. Fewer than 1 million years ago, sites are represented in the north by the Peking Man culture at Zhoukoudian site 1, and in the south by the Guanyin Cave culture at Guanyin Cave in Qianxi, Guizhou. All in all, Chinese Early Paleolithic cultures are basically of a type similar to the Oldowan cultures, and do not seem to display the technological advancements of the Acheulean Culture of the West. However, some scholars believe that there may have been exchanges between the Chinese Paleolithic culture and the Western Acheulean culture during this period.

=== Middle Paleolithic ===
The Middle Paleolithic culture in China can be represented by the Dingcun site found in Xiangfen, Shanxi Province. Also important are the Zhoukoudian Locality 15 culture and the Shanxi Yanggao Xujiayao Culture. The Middle Paleolithic cultures of China maintained the types and processing techniques of earlier cultures. Despite slight changes in types and slight advances in technology, they were all slow in progress. One notable feature is lack of significant development of Levallois technique.

=== Later period ===
Into the Late Palaeolithic, the number of sites increased, artefacts of visual culture became more abundant and elaborate, technological change took place and the material evidence of cultural types became more diverse from one another. In North China and South China, as well as in other regions, there are cultural types of a similar periodization but with different technological traditions.

In north China, there is a tradition of small stone tools inherited from the previous period, the important representatives of which are the Sarawusu site, the Zhiyu culture, the Xiaonanhai site, and the Shandingdong site. There is the Blade culture type, represented by the Shuidonggou culture in Lingwu, Ningxia, which has more than a few similarities with its Western contemporaries. There are also typical microlithic cultures discovered after the 1970s, such as the Xiachuan culture in Qinshui, Shanxi, and the Hutouliang culture at the Hutouliang site in Yangyuan, Hebei.

In the northeast, important sites belonging to this period include the Xiaogushan site in Haicheng, Liaoning, and the Yanjiagang site in Harbin, Heilongjiang.

In the south, several regional cultures emerged during this period, such as the Fulin culture type named after the Fulin site in Hanyuan, Sichuan, the Tongliang culture type represented by the Zhang Ertang site in Tongliang, Chongqing, and the Maomao culture type initially discovered at the Maomao site in Xingyi, Guizhou.

In addition, a number of Paleolithic cultural sites belonging to this period or slightly later have been found in Tibet, Xinjiang and Qinghai. In general, the main characteristic of the cultures of this period is that, with the exception of a few sites, the production of blade crafts and bone and horn tools was not very well developed.

== Mesolithic ==
The Mesolithic period in China, between the Upper Paleolithic and Early Neolithic, was characterized by the manufacture of microliths, and is therefore also known as the "Microlith Period". China was in the Mesolithic period from about 10,000 to 7,000 years ago, with cultures successively entering the Neolithic period after one or two millennia, a relatively brief span of time. There are also the Shayuan Culture of Shayuan in Dali, Shaanxi, the Lingjing Culture of Lingjing in Xuchang, Henan, and the Xiachuan Culture of Xiachuan in Qinshui, Shanxi.

== Neolithic ==
The Neolithic period was characterized by a gradual progression from food gathering to food production, and by the development of stone tools from rudimentary to specialized. With the advent of agriculture, people had a more reliable food supply; the emergence of long-term tribes led to the complexity of living in groups; people began to use abstract symbols to represent concrete things, and representational art emerged. The Neolithic 'revolution' was a major juncture in human history.

=== Peiligang and Cishan cultures ===
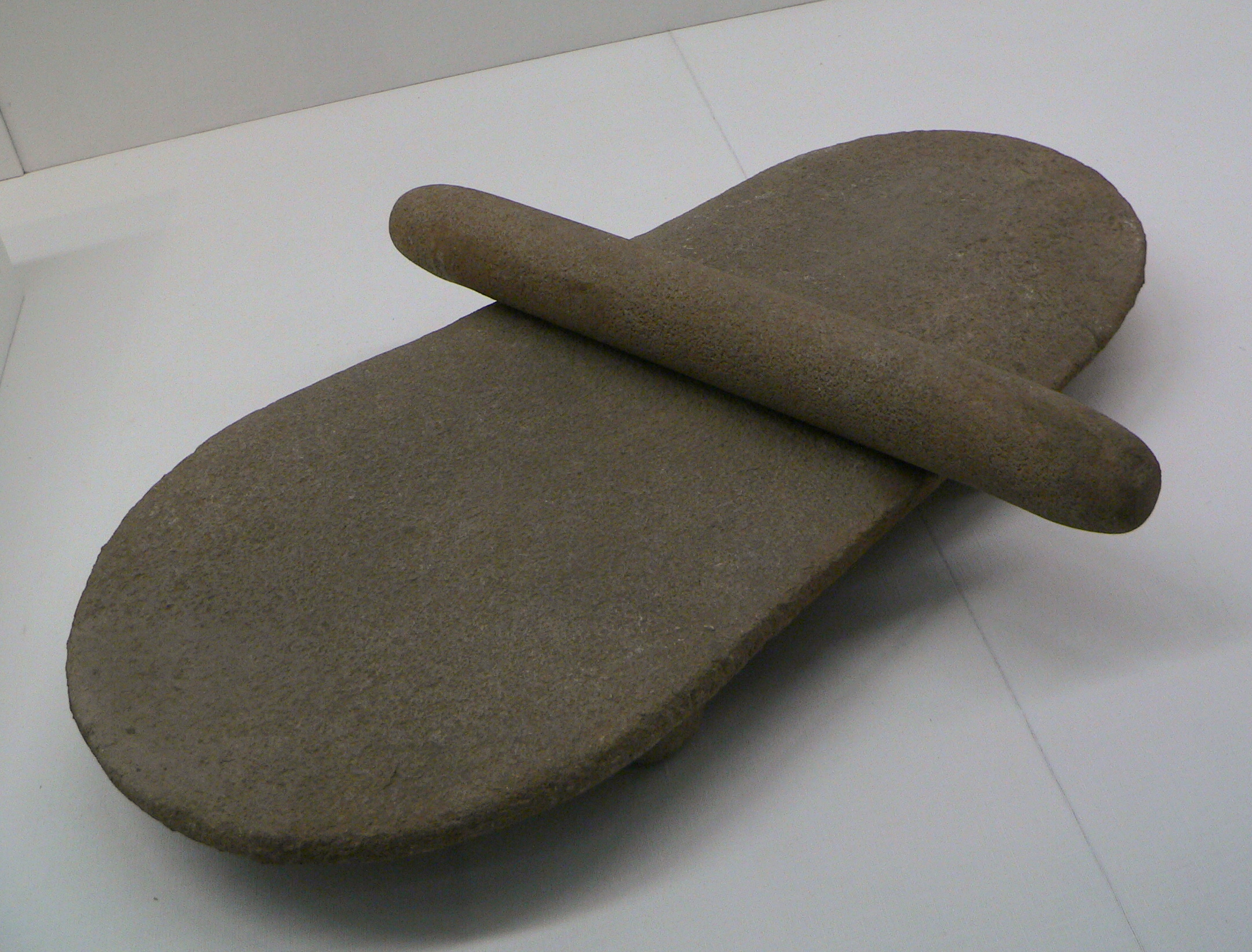
Stone Grinding Plate and Stone Grinding Rod, Peiligang Culture

The Peiligang culture and the Cishan culture are the earliest Neolithic cultures in China that have been seen in archaeology so far. Both cultures already had agriculture, but the large number of excavations of tree seeds, fish bones, and animal bones indicates that gathering food was still of considerable importance. The presence of agricultural tools, grains, and domestic animals signifies that a significant portion of food was already supplied by production. Early Neolithic pottery was handmade, but it was fired to more than 900 °C (1,650 °F), and the forms were already quite complex, with a number of motifs and even a few paintings. Many of the pottery forms of the Peiligang culture and the Cishan culture are also found in the later Yangshao culture, where rope patterns and colorful paintings are even more prevalent. Round and square semisubterranean dwelling sites also originated in the Peiligang and Cishan cultures, while the same is seen in the village sites of the Yangshao culture. All of this shows that Peiligang culture and Cishan culture are the predecessors of Yangshao culture. The Peiligang culture sites are mainly located in the central part of Henan. In terms of the age determined by carbon-14 dating, Peiligang culture has three dates of 5935±480 BCE, 5195±300 BCE (5879 BCE after dendrochronological correction) and 7350±1000 BCE. Roughly contemporaneous with Peiligang, the Egou Beigang culture is 5315–5025 BCE (corrected to 5916–5737 BCE). The main artifacts of Peiligang culture are stone grinding discs with feet, stone grinding poles, narrow and flat stone shovels with double curved edges and stone scythes with serrated teeth, which are obviously tools related to agricultural production, and their pottery assemblage includes figurines of pigs' heads.

- The Jiahu Gudi unearthed at the Jiahu site between 7,000 and 5,700 years ago is the earliest, best-preserved and most numerous musical instrument in the world that can still be used for playing. The excavated tortoiseshell has 16 Jiahu symbols dated to about 6600 BCE, but they cannot be conclusively identified as writing.
- The main sites of the Cishan site are located in the southern part of Hebei and the northern part of Henan. The data for the site of the Cishan culture are dated to 5405–5110 BCE (corrected to 6005–5794 BCE). In the cellar of the Cishan culture site, middens of decayed grains were unearthed, which were judged to be probably corn. A large number of pig and dog skeletons were also unearthed at Cishan. As the relationship between the Cishan culture and the Peiligang culture is close, some scholars have advanced the idea of a singular "Peiligang–Cishan culture", while others believe that they are two different cultural types with some common features. Overall, it seems that the Peiligang culture is closer to the later part of the Cishan culture.

=== Yangshao culture ===
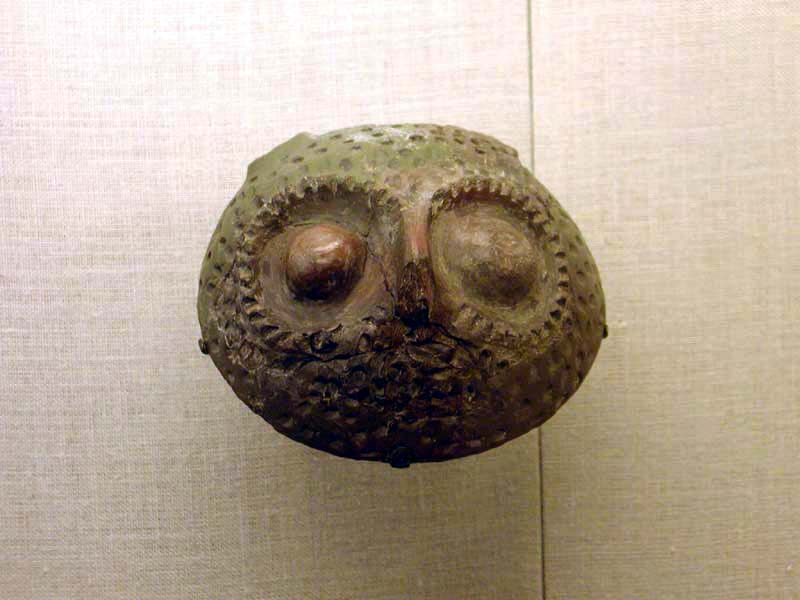
Owl-faced figure, Yangshao culture Miaodigou type pottery

Yangshao culture is the mainstream of Neolithic culture in the Yellow River basin, distributed throughout Henan, Shanxi, Shaanxi, Hebei, Liaodong, Ningxia, southern Inner Mongolia, and Hubei's northwestern part, including the entire Central Plains and the Guanshan area. Carbon-14 dating has been widely employed, with results about 4515–2460 BCE (corrected to 5150–2960 BCE), with a continuation of more than two thousand years. The Yangshao culture can be represented by the Banpo Village site in Shaanxi; of course, there are several types of Yangshao culture presented across temporal and spatial divides.

The Yangshao culture significantly developed agriculture. The villages were quite large, on the order of square kilometers. Dwelling sites are usually square or round and semisubterranian, divided into inner and outer chambers, with flat or even chalky floors. Chambers often have the remains of burnt fires. Tribes were often located on river terraces. In some cases, sites in good condition can encompass several non-contiguous cultural layers, suggesting that agriculture was practiced in the form of nomadic cultivation. But tribal migration often depended on conditions favorable to farming, so that the same site could be occupied successively by people moving in to establish a settled tribe.

The site at Banpo, Xi'an, Shaanxi, has at least two cultural layers, with the ruins and cellars of one layer superimposed on the remains of the other, separated by layers of soil alternately lush with grass seeds and tree pollen. Only with the "slash-and-burn" method of cultivation is it possible to have this kind of alternation of trees and grass on the same site. The Banpo Tribe may have had hundreds of dwelling sites, with the domiciles and storage caves concentrated in the center of the settlement, surrounded by a deep ditch. To the north of the Banpo site, there is a communal cemetery, where the remains of children and adults are buried, and the territory of the living and the dead is clearly separated. There is also a large house in the village, which may have served as a meeting place for the whole village, or some other public function. It is inferred that the tribes of Yangshao culture seem to have had a certain degree of political organisation and a sense of self-grouping. The phenomenon of burial in cemeteries reflects group consciousness having transcended the boundaries of time.

Agriculture at Yangshao was dominated by the cultivation of millet and other grains; storage caves at several sites have yielded millet-type grains. Pottery jars for storing vegetable seeds have also been excavated at the Banpo site. Livestock were mostly pigs and dogs, with fewer cows and sheep. Agricultural tools include stone hoes and shovels for plowing, stone knives and axes for felling, and stone sharpeners for general scraping. Yangshao agriculture was productive to such a level that storage caves are found distributed all throughout the villages, clearly indicating surplus food supply. Yangshao culture pottery often have painted decoration. For this reason, archaeologists once referred to Yangshao culture as "colored pottery culture". Motifs include geometric shapes and flowing irregular lines, as well as fairly realistic or pictorial images, such as fish, pigs, frogs, sheep, human heads, and the like. Several of these rudimentary engravings and paintings have symbolic functions, to the point that certain scholars consider Yangshao pottery patterns a form of writing. On the whole, Yangshao culture in the social organization, production level and the use of abstract symbols have a considerable degree of development. Yangshao culture has a long history and is dominant in the Central Plains, and has had a non-negligible influence on the Neolithic cultures of the surrounding neighboring regions.

=== Longshan culture ===
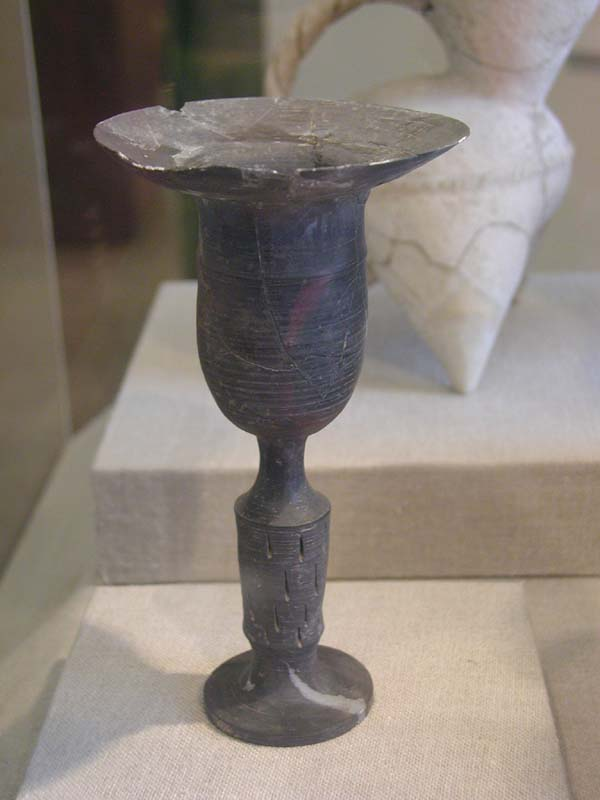
Eggshell high-stemmed cup of the Longshan culture, excavated at the Chengzi site, Zhucheng, Shandong, 1976

Immediately following the Yangshao culture, the late Neolithic culture in the Central Plains was the Longshan culture, which was more widely distributed and richer in content.

During the Yangshao culture, the development of agriculture stabilized the food supply, leading to an increase in population. Thus, on the one hand, there was an overflow of population to form more settlements and spread the culture to areas never before inhabited by people. On the other hand, also because of the limited space available for habitation, the inhabitants of the cluster had to settle in the same place permanently. The Longshan culture of each region is thus quite localized. As to Longshan culture in the Central Plains, there existed Henan Longshan culture, Shaanxi Longshan culture, Shandong Longshan culture, of which Henan Longshan culture formed the direct descendants of Yangshao culture.

The Longshan culture of Henan occupied the Jinnan and Ji'nan regions, mainly along the middle and lower reaches of the Yellow River. The intermediate type from Yangshao culture to Longshan culture in Henan is the Miaodigou II in the border area of Henan, Jin and Shaanxi, whose carbon 14 date is 2310±95 years BCE (corrected to 2780±145 years BCE). In contrast, the entire Henan Longshan culture dates from 2100 to 1810 BCE (corrected to 2515 to 2155 BCE). The Longshan culture of Shaanxi is comparable in age and also inherited the Neolithic culture of Miaodigou II.

The Longshan culture of Henan developed on the basis of the Yangshao culture, while there were several changes in its content. Farming tools include the Lei Si, sickle and bone spatula. Agricultural products were still primarily corn and grain, but the harvest seems to have been much larger. Carpenters' tools were no longer axes for felling, but more processing tools for cutting. Pottery in the wheel system components increased greatly. Villages had walls made of rammed earth for self-defense, and there were apparently wars between villages. Some wounded skeletons were thrown in heaps in pits and caves, probably also victims of war. Religious beliefs emerged, and bone divination and special burial rites are sufficient to indicate the direction of this development. Eggshell pottery, with its thin, hard walls, was not intended for everyday use, and this specialized utensil was developed for religious ceremonies as well. Ancestor worship was also institutionalized. The division of social status and occupations within the same community created a phenomenon of social differentiation, which is also linked to the growing complexity and organization of the community. Settlements were more permanent, and therefore had a clearer sense of community, which is also expressed in the individual characteristics of local cultures. However, the density of the distribution of settlements increased from former times, and group-to-group contacts and exchanges were inevitable. Neighboring settlements must interact with each other, so the characteristics of the local culture of neighboring districts are often similar, from east to west, or from south to north, the visible cultural differences show a gradual process, and it is difficult to find a clear-cut line of demarcation of the local culture. As a whole, the influence of the Longshan culture radiated beyond the Central Plains.

== Bronze Age ==
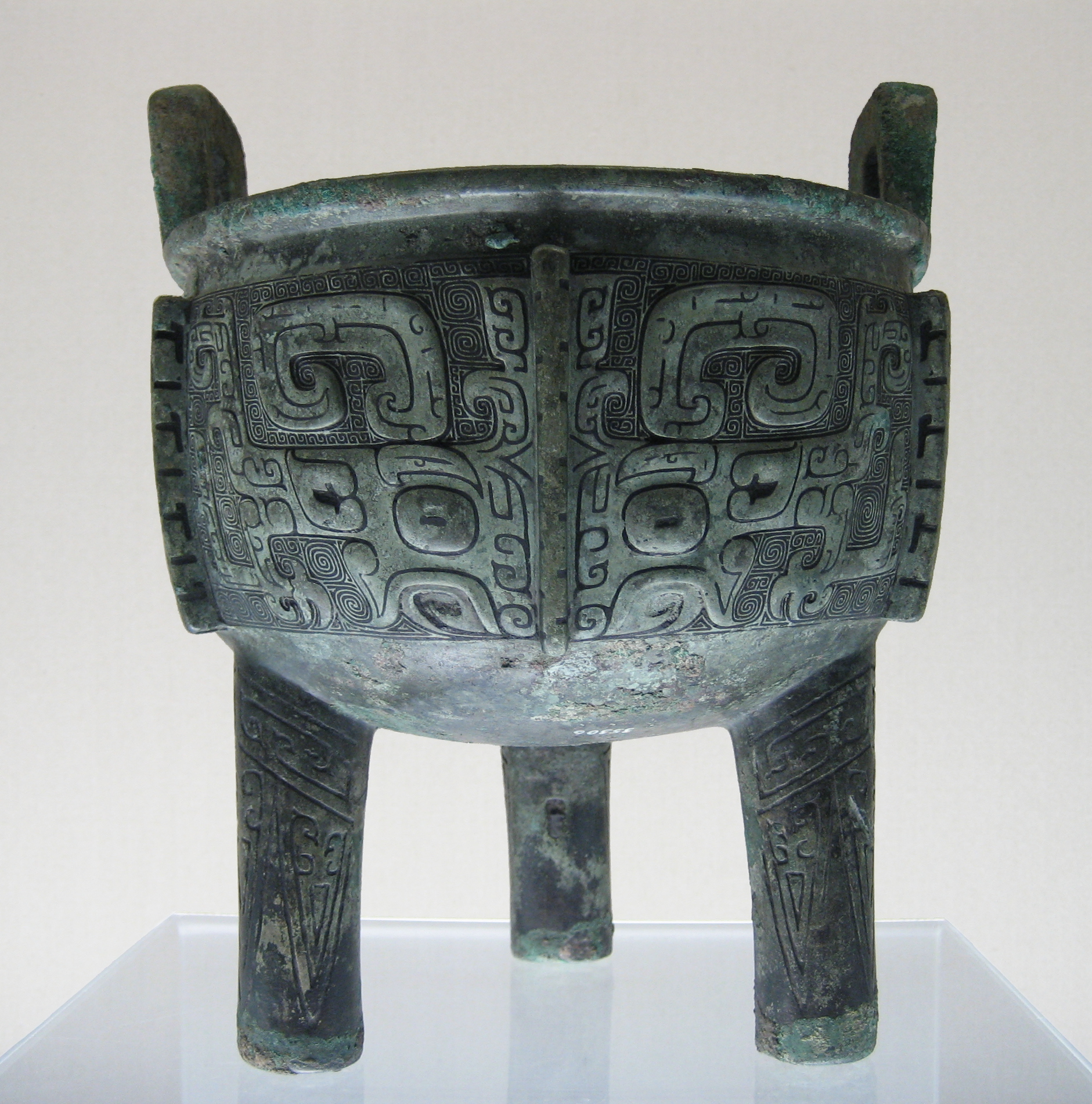
Liu Ding of the Shang Dynasty

China entered the Bronze Age and went through several different stages of development: early, middle and late. Some scholars have divided China's Bronze Age from the Shang and Zhou dynasties to the Warring States period into four phases: the heyday, the decadence, the mid-emergence, and the decline. Some scholars have also divided this period into five stages: pre-Yin Shang, late Yin Shang, Western Zhou, pre-Eastern Zhou, and late Eastern Zhou.

Bronze cultures throughout China have their own characteristics and styles, and can be divided into different regional types. The earliest excavated bronze objects in China (2900 BCE to 2740 BCE) belong to the Majiayao culture of Gansu. Academician Zhang Guangzhi, in his book The Bronze Age of China, was the first to clearly point out that the Xia, Shang, and Zhou dynasties were the heyday of the Bronze Age, followed by the Spring and Autumn period and the Warring States period. The Houmuwu ding is the largest and heaviest bronze vessel ever found in China. Academician Du Zhengsheng pointed out in Ancient Society and the State that from the Stone Age to the Bronze Age, there was no breakthrough in the development of the tools of production in China, but only class and social changes, and that bronzes were mainly used as ceremonial weapons and weapons of war as a symbol of political power.

=== Erlitou culture ===
The Erlitou culture is considered the beginning of the Bronze Age in China. The Erlitou culture includes both the culture of the Erlitou site and the cultural landscape reflected in hundreds of sites that have the cultural characteristics of the Erlitou site in addition to the Erlitou site. The Erlitou site and the Erlitou culture became recognized as key research objects for ascertaining the historicity of the Xia dynasty. The broad geographic dispersal of Erlitou material culture may indicate that the society of the time had moved from a pluralistic situation where a number of competing political entities existed side by side to the period of a wide-area dynastic royal state.

As the earliest remnant of a wide-area royal state in East Asia, the Erlitou culture can be called the "earliest China". The civilizational underpinnings of the Erlitou culture became the mainstay of Chinese civilization through the inheritance and abandonment between the dynasties of the Shang and Zhou eras. The Erlitou site is the namesake of the Erlitou culture and has been tentatively recognized as the site of a capital city in the middle to late Xia dynasty.

=== Erligang culture ===
Erligang culture is a culture type named after the Shang dynasty cultural remains at the Erligang site in Zhengzhou, Henan. Also known as the Erligang period Shang culture, it is an early Bronze Age archaeological culture between the Erlitou Xia culture and the Yinxu late Shang culture.

In 1950, archaeologists discovered a new kind of remains for the first time at the Erligang site, which is located two miles southeast of the old city of Zhengzhou, and since the Erligang site is the earliest typical site where this kind of cultural remains can be found, the name of Erligang culture was proposed in 1954.

According to archaeological discoveries, the pre-Shang dynasty, centered on Erligang in Zhengzhou, the sites of the Yin–Shang period, such as Liulige in Huixian and Donggangou in Luoyang, belong to this era.

=== Late Shang ===
Following a brief occupation at Huanbei, the final part of the Shang dynasty centered on Xiaotun Village in Anyang, the upper levels of the Zhengzhou Park area, and the Taishan Temple site and burials in Luoyang. There are also tombs belonging to this era. Yinxu is the first documented and archaeologically and oracle-bone proven capital city site in Chinese history, dating from around the end of the 14th century to the middle of the 11th century BCE. Since the discovery of Yinxu, about 150,000 pieces of oracle bones with characters have been unearthed. More than 5,000 individual characters have been identified from these inscribed oracle bones, and about 1,700 Chinese characters can be recognized. The information recorded in the oracle bones advances the credible history of written records in China to the Shang dynasty, and modern Chinese characters evolved from the oracle bones. There are also tens of thousands of pieces of pottery, about 1,500 pieces of bronze ceremonial objects, about 3,500 pieces of bronze weapons, about 2,600 pieces of jade, more than 6,500 pieces of stone tools, and more than 30,000 pieces of bone tools.

== See also ==
- Yellow River civilization
- Yangtze civilization
- Five thousand years of Chinese civilization
- Prehistoric Asia
- Neolithic in China
