= Liao civilization =

Ancient Northeast Asian civilization

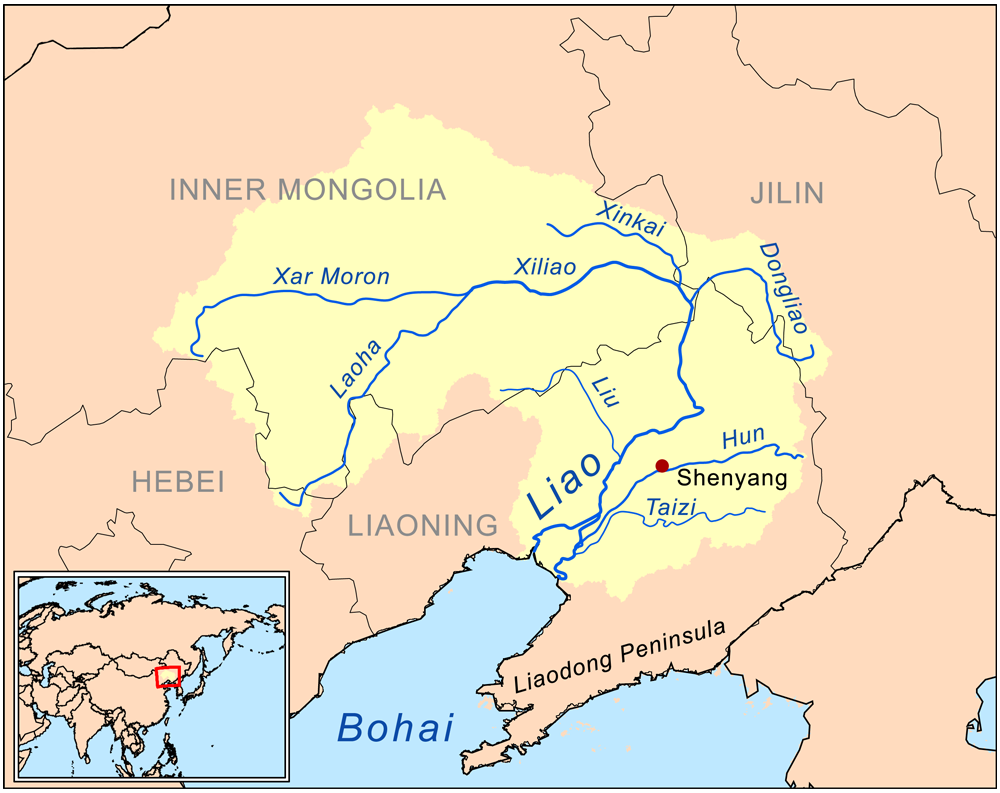
Liao river

The Liao Civilization or Liao River Civilization (Chinese: 遼河文明), named after the Liao River, is an umbrella term for several ancient civilizations that originated in the Liao basin. It is thought to have first formed in 6,200 BC. This civilization was discovered when Ryuzo Torii, a Japanese archaeologist, discovered the Hongshan culture in 1908.

== Culture ==
Large-scale pit-type houses, graves and temples with altars were excavated. It is thought that the Liao civilization may have been "a country" of the prehistoric age.

A model of the feng shui were excavated from remains of the Hongshan culture. Ball products such as the jade which made the precursors of Chinese dragon were discovered in remains of Xinglongwa culture. In addition, the oldest pit-comb ware and Liaoning bronze dagger (biwa form bronze sword) were excavated.

It was contemporaneous with the ancient Yellow River civilization and ancient Yangtze civilization. Northeast China (Dongbei) was an agricultural society during the Neolithic and Bronze ages, which cultivated grains such as millets, buckwheat, echinochloa, soy beans, and rice. According to Sarah M. Nelson, the native population gradually started producing bronze. Local jade and bronze designs, different from those of the contemporary Central Plains, also contributed to the jade and bronze artifacts of Shang dynasty. It is also possible that an early form of writing or proto-writing had been developed in the region.

== Environment ==
This region was thought to have been desert for the past 1 million years. However, a 2015 study found that the region once featured rich aquatic resources and deep lakes and forests that existed from 12,000 years ago to 4,000 years ago. It was changed into desert by climate change which began approximately 4,200 years ago. Therefore, people of the Hongshan culture may have emigrated to the Yellow River in the south approximately 4,000 years ago and later influenced Chinese culture.

== People ==
The most ancient populations of the West Liao River valley exhibited a high frequency of Haplogroup N-M231. A study by Yinqiu Cui et al. from 2013 found that 63% of the combined samples from various Hongshan archeological sites belonged to the subclade N1 (xN1a, N1c) of the paternal haplogroup N-M231 and calculated N to have been the predominant haplogroup in the region in the Neolithic period at 89%, its share gradually declining over time. Today, this haplogroup is most common in among northern Siberian ethnicities, such as the Nganasan and Yakuts, as well as among southern Siberian ethnicities, such as the Buryats, Siberian Tatars, Khakas, and Tsaatan. Individuals at the Liao civilization were assigned into five different Y sub-haplogroups using diagnostic single nucleotide polymorphisms, namely N1 (xN1a, N1c), N1c, C/C3e, O3a (O3a3) and O3a3c. Ancient samples of the Jinggouzi site situated to the northwest of the Liao civilization were assigned to Haplogroup C-M217. Northern nomads from Jinggouzi might have entered the West Liao River valley, but these Jinggouzi people (closely related to Xianbei and Oroqen) were culturally and genetically distinct from the original people of the West Liao River valley, who carried the characteristic Haplogroup N-M231 lineage. The Haplogroup O-M122 that was observed among Liao individuals is believed to have spread to the Liao civilization from the Yellow River civilization in the southwest. This lineage is most commonly associated with speakers of Sino-Tibetan languages (such as the Han Chinese). However, its frequency only began to rise in the Bronze Age, and the ancient Liao River population was different from the Yellow River population. This means the Liao civilization was occupied by a diverse sequence of human cultures that were originally distinct from both the farming populations of the Yellow River and the nomads of the Eurasian steppe. According to a 2024 study, the increase in haplogroups O2a2-M117 and N1a1-TAT during the Bronze Age is associated with migrations by Yellow River farmers and Eastern Eurasian steppe nomads into the West Liao River valley. Elevated Southern East Asian-related ancestry is also detected in West Liao River populations.

A 2025 study found that Hongshan populations inherited genetic contributions from three main sources: Ancient Northeast Asians (ANA), Neolithic Yellow River farmers (NYR), and Shandong hunter-gatherers (Shandong_HG). The ANA-related ancestry likely came from the earlier local Zhaobaogou culture, while the NYR-related ancestry was associated with the Yangshao culture and may have been introduced indirectly by Middle Neolithic farmers from the Dawenkou culture migrating northward from Shandong. These Dawenkou-related farmers carried about 40% ancestry from an early Neolithic Shandong hunter-gatherer lineage and about 60% from a Yangshao-related lineage. Thus, the study’s authors also model Hongshan populations as a mixture of Dawenkou-related and ANA-related populations. Likewise, another study modeled Hongshan populations as a 50:50 mixture of Yellow River populations and ANA populations, with Yellow River populations being represented by Middle Neolithic Yellow River farmers and Early Neolithic coastal Northern East Asians. The Hongshan population can also be modeled as a two-way admixture of Early Holocene southeastern Mongolian populations, who have more Yumin affinities, and coastal Shandong hunter-gatherers. The presence of haplogroup N1 is attributed to these southeastern Mongolian populations. The Hongshan population is additionally estimated to have excess affinities with southeastern Mongolian populations instead of Yellow River or Amur River groups.

The formation and development of the Lower Xiajiadian culture population was likely a complex process affected by admixture of ethnically different people. The Lower Xiajiadian culture of the West Liao River included people carrying haplogroups from northern Asia but there was genetic evidence of migration of farmers from the Central Plains (Zhongyuan). The climate of the West Liao River valley was warmer at the beginning of the Early Bronze Age, which may be one of the driving forces for the northward migration of the Central Plains farming population. An archaeological study showed that the painted potteries of the Lower Xiajiadian were influenced by the Erlitou culture. The people of the Dadianzi site of Inner Mongolia received the haplogroup O3 from the immigrants of the Central Plains, and a Lower Xiajiadian individual was identified to possess both the maternal lineage of D4 and paternal lineage of O3-M122. Due to a cooling climate, part of the Lower Xiajiadian culture population migrated to the south and influenced the Central Plains. Among the Yin Ruins relics of Shang Dynasty, artefacts with northern cultural influences have been identified. One study estimated that the Lower Xiajidian culture population (WLR_LN) received significant Yellow River input at 74%–88%, with the rest being derived from the preceding Hongshan population (or WLR_MN) or Early Neolithic Amur River (AR_EN) groups. Genetic continuity between the Hongshan and Lower Xiajidian culture populations was also ensured through the intermediate Xiaoheyan culture population, who could be modeled as a mixture of Early Neolithic Sitaimengguying-related (66.9% ± 6.5%) and Shandong Dawenkou-related (33.1% ± 6.5%) populations, similar to the Hongshan population.

The Upper Xiajiadian culture and Bronze Age West Liao River farmers (WLR_BA) have more Siberian affinities than the preceding Lower Xiajiadian population. This is tenuously attributed to climate change, attracting Siberian-related migrants who practiced pastoral economies to the region. This particular ancestral lineage has been associated with Proto-Korean-speakers. Subclades of paternal haplogroups O and C were common, with haplogroup N forming a smaller minority compared to the Lower Xiajiadian culture. However, there is no evidence of mass demographic replacement by Siberian-related migrants, with many Lower Xiajiadian lineages being preserved. There is likewise long-term continuity between WLR_BA populations and modern Koreans and Manchus. Ancient West Liao River populations also have close genetic affinities with modern Qiang people from Wenchuan.

According to a 2020 study, WLR_BA populations could be modeled as having 21 ± 7% input from outlier WLR_BA_o populations, who are genetically indistinguishable from Amur River populations but are more related to succeeding Amur River populations (AR_Xianbei_IA) and modern Tungusic-speaking populations. The rest of WLR_BA's genome derives from WLR_LN populations. According to Zhu et al. (2024), the Siberian ancestry of WLR_BA populations can be represented by AR_EN or Middle Neolithic Haminmangha (HMMH_MN) populations. WLR_BA populations also have significant Yellow River ancestry, which is estimated at 57.6%–61.1%. According to Qiu et al. (2026), WLR_BA can be modeled as a mixture of Longshan-related Yellow River populations (48.2%) and Ancient Northeast Asian-related populations (51.8%), who are represented by AR_EN populations. Another study estimated higher Yellow River input in WLR_BA, represented by Middle Neolithic Yellow River groups, at 66.1–85.2%, with the rest coming from Ancient Northeast Asian sources, represented by Neolithic Devil's Gate populations. WLR_BA can also be adequately modeled without Early Neolithic Shandong-related input compared to Hongshan populations.

== List of cultures ==
Various Neolithic cultures have been identified in the Xiliao River region. Broomcorn millet and foxtail millet were the main cereal crops, while pigs and dogs were the main domesticated animals found at Neolithic archaeological sites.

- Xiaohexi culture 小河西文化 (9,000-8,500 BP)
- Xinglongwa culture 兴隆洼文化 (8,200-7,400 BP)
- Zhaobaogou culture 赵宝沟文化 (7,500-6,500 BP)
- Fuhe culture 富河文化 (7,200-7,000 BP)
- Xinle culture 新樂文化 (7,200-6,800 BP)
- Hongshan culture 红山文化 (6,500-5,000 BP)
- Xiaoheyan culture 小河沿文化 (5,000-4,000 BP)

Bronze Age cultures of the Xiliao River region are:

- Lower Xiajiadian culture 夏家店下层文化 (4,000-3,200 BP)
- Liaoning bronze dagger culture 辽宁青铜文化
- Upper Xiajiadian culture 夏家店上层文化 (3,200-2,600 BP)
- Jinggouzi culture 井沟子文化 (2,500-2,150 BP)

== See also ==
- Yangtze civilization
- Yellow river civilization
- Prehistory of China
