= Shandingdong man =

Archaeological modern specimen

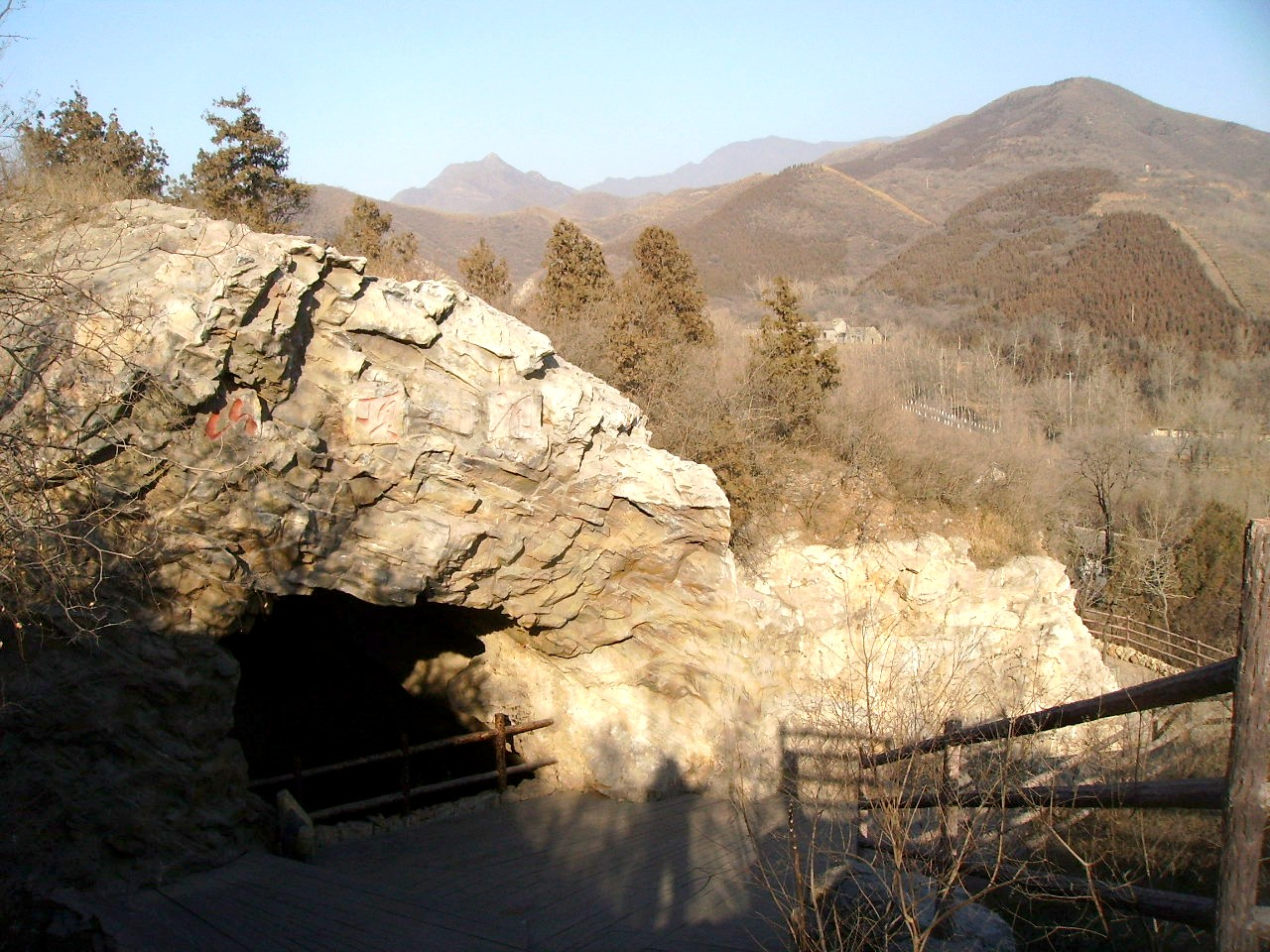
Shandingdong

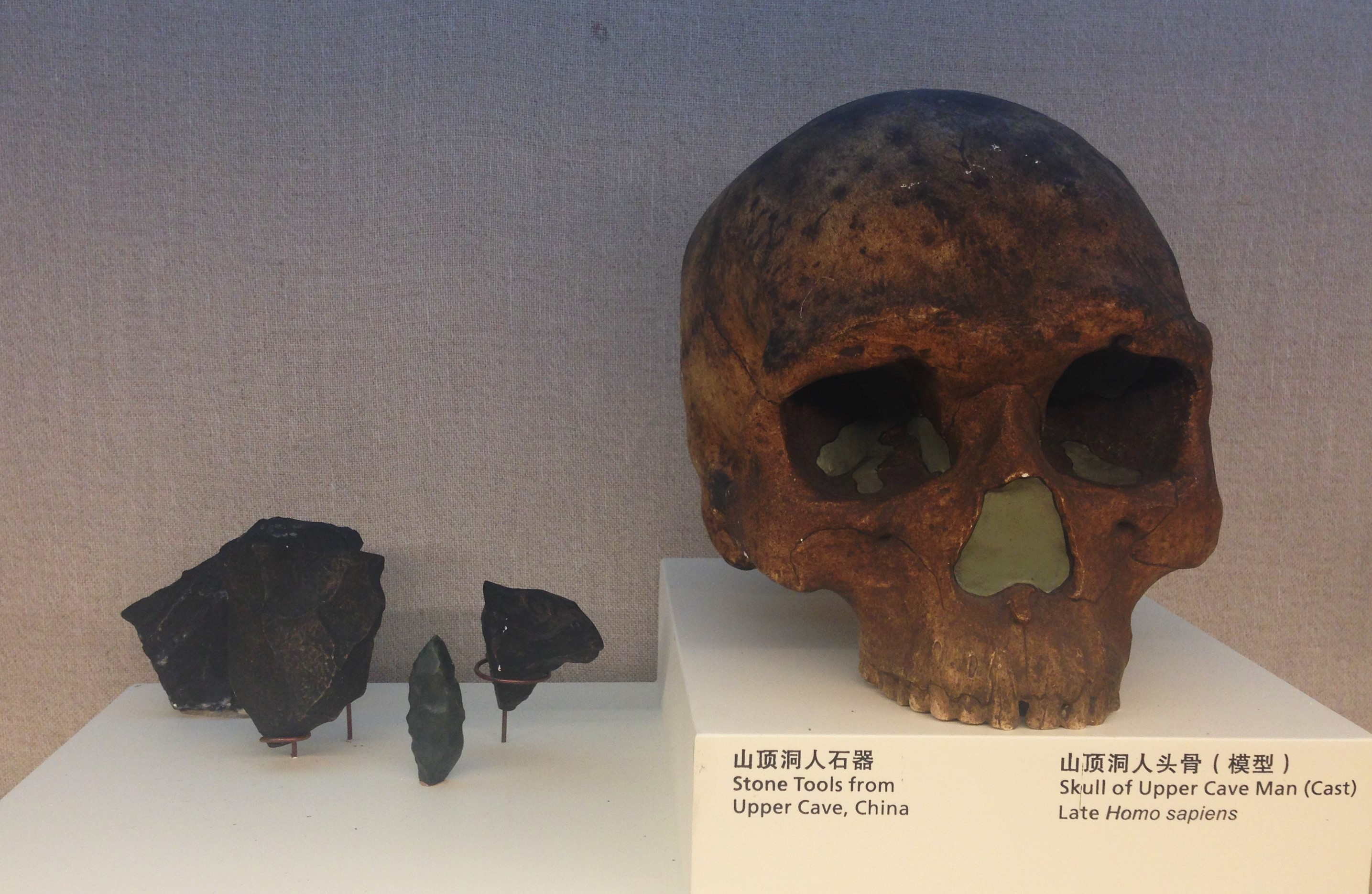
Cast of the skull of the Shandingdong man, and some of his tools

Shandingdong man (山顶洞人) is an archaeological modern specimen for the cave of Shandingdong (山顶洞), one of the upper caves of Zhoukoudian Cave Site in China.

The analysis of the remains gave two carbon dates: one date for animal remains at a layer deeper than that of the Shandingdong man, of 18,870 +/- 420 BP, and one date from remains associated with the Shandingdong man to 10,770 +/- 360 BP. The Shandingdong man was buried at the site, with various ornaments, such as polished perforated pebbles, characteristic of the end of the Paleolithic period.
