= Yangtze civilization =

Various ancient Neolithic and Bronze Age cultures in China

Yangtze basin

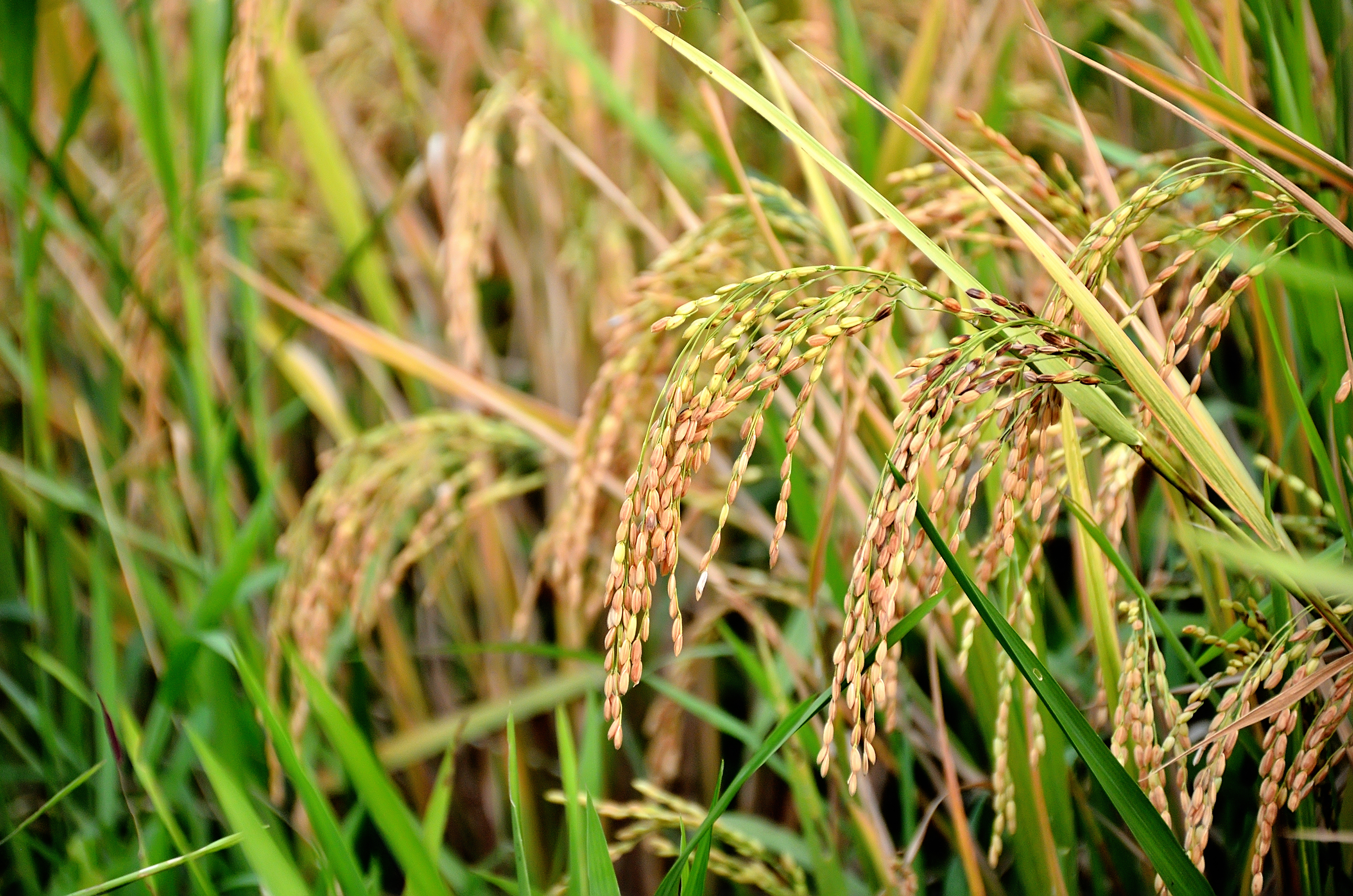
Asian rice, grown since the 9th millennium BC

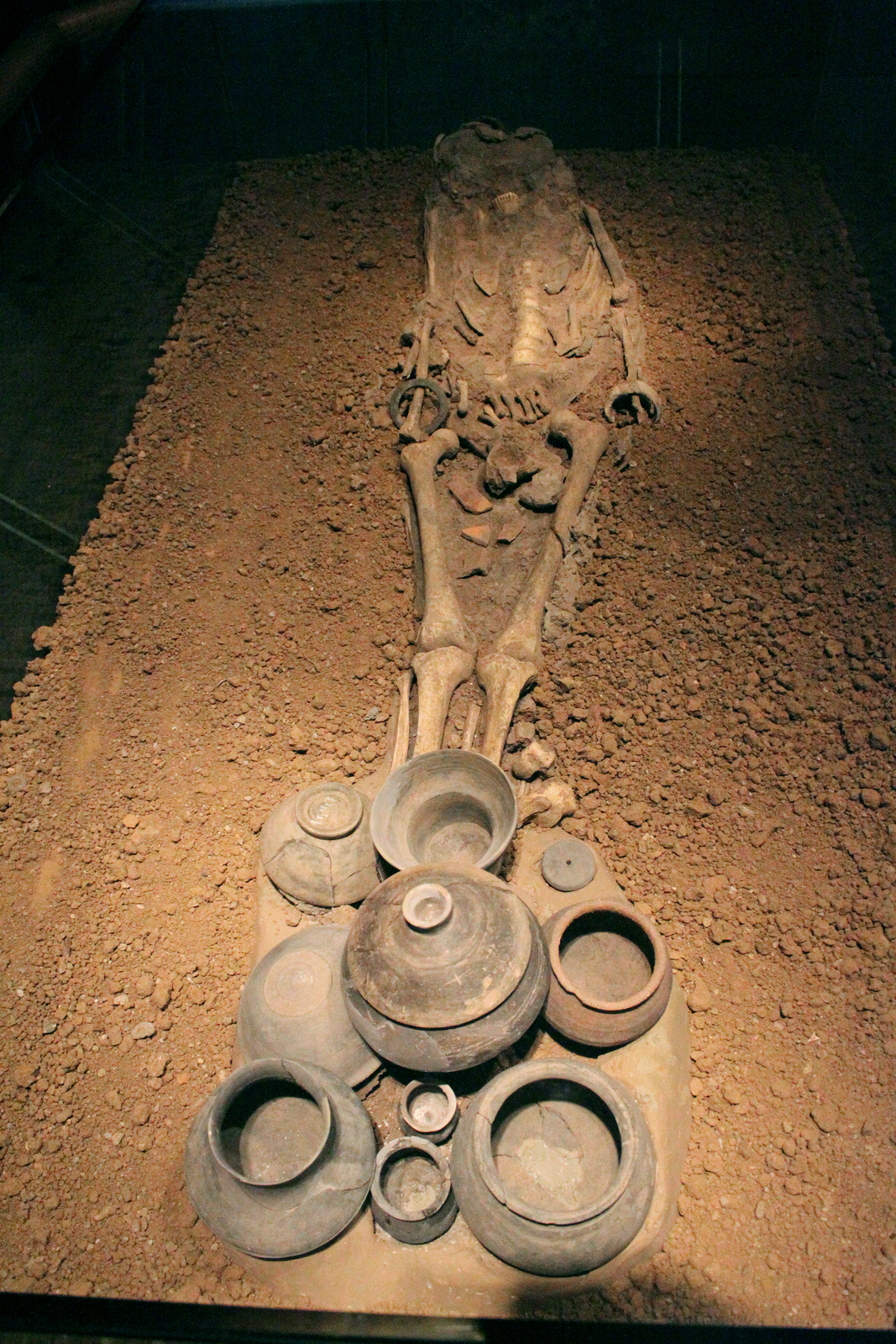
Skeleton and burial vessels of the Qujialing culture (3400–2600 BC)

Yangtze civilization (simplified Chinese: 长江文明; traditional Chinese: 長江文明) is a generic name for various ancient Neolithic and Bronze Age cultures from the Yangtze basin in China, a contemporary civilization by the neighboring Yellow River civilization.

== Cultures ==
=== Upper Yangtze ===
- Pengtoushan culture (7000–6100 BCE)
- Daxi culture (5000–3000 BCE)
- Qujialing culture (3400–2600 BCE)
- Shijiahe culture (2500–2000 BCE)

=== Lower Yangtze ===
- Hemudu culture (5500–3300 BCE)
- Majiabang culture (5000–3300 BCE)
- Songze culture (3800–3300 BCE)
- Liangzhu culture (3300–2300 BCE)
- Wucheng culture (1600 BCE–?)

== See also ==
- Yellow river civilization
- Liao civilization
- Prehistory of China
