= Yellow River civilization =

Ancient Chinese civilization

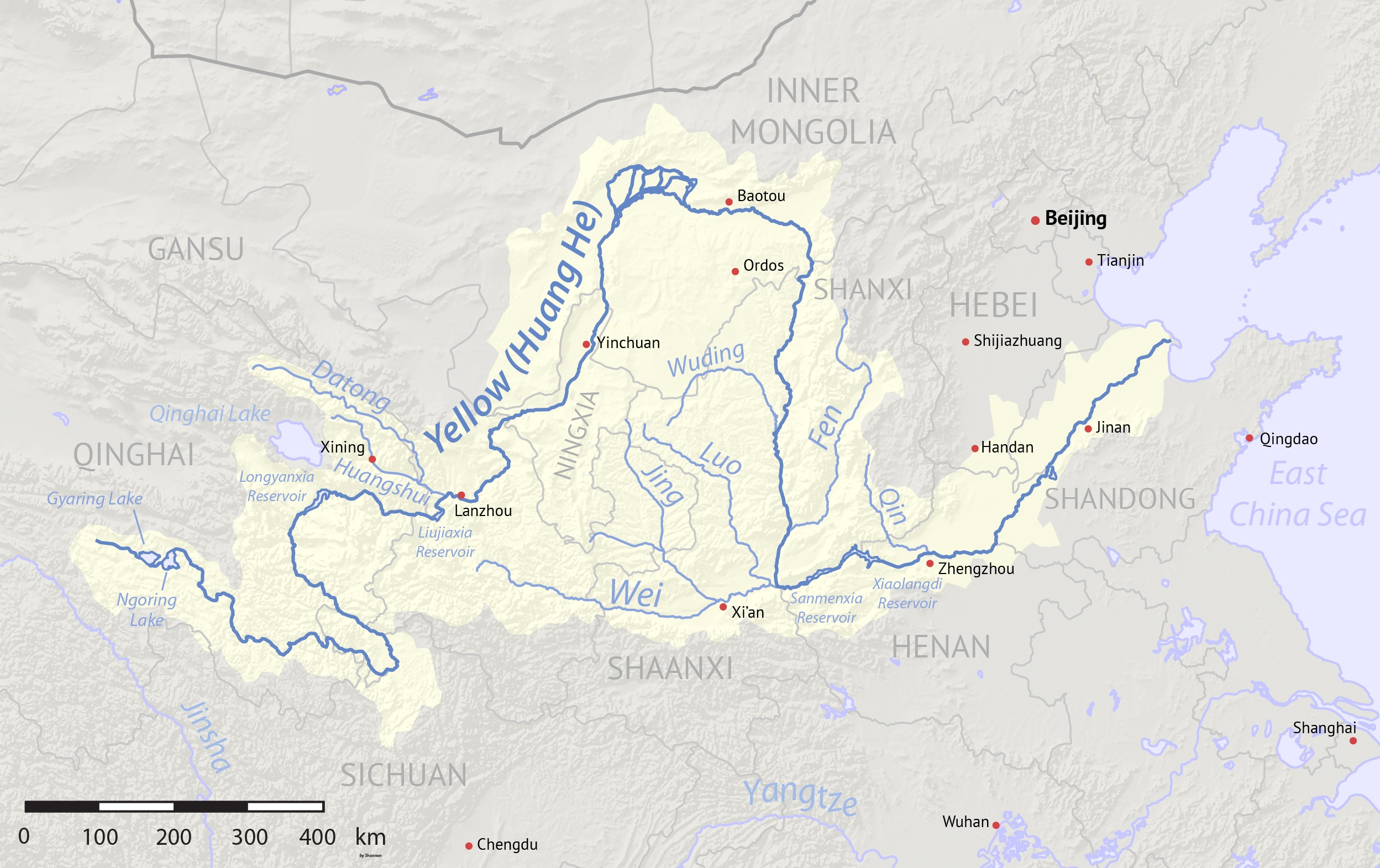
Yellow River basin

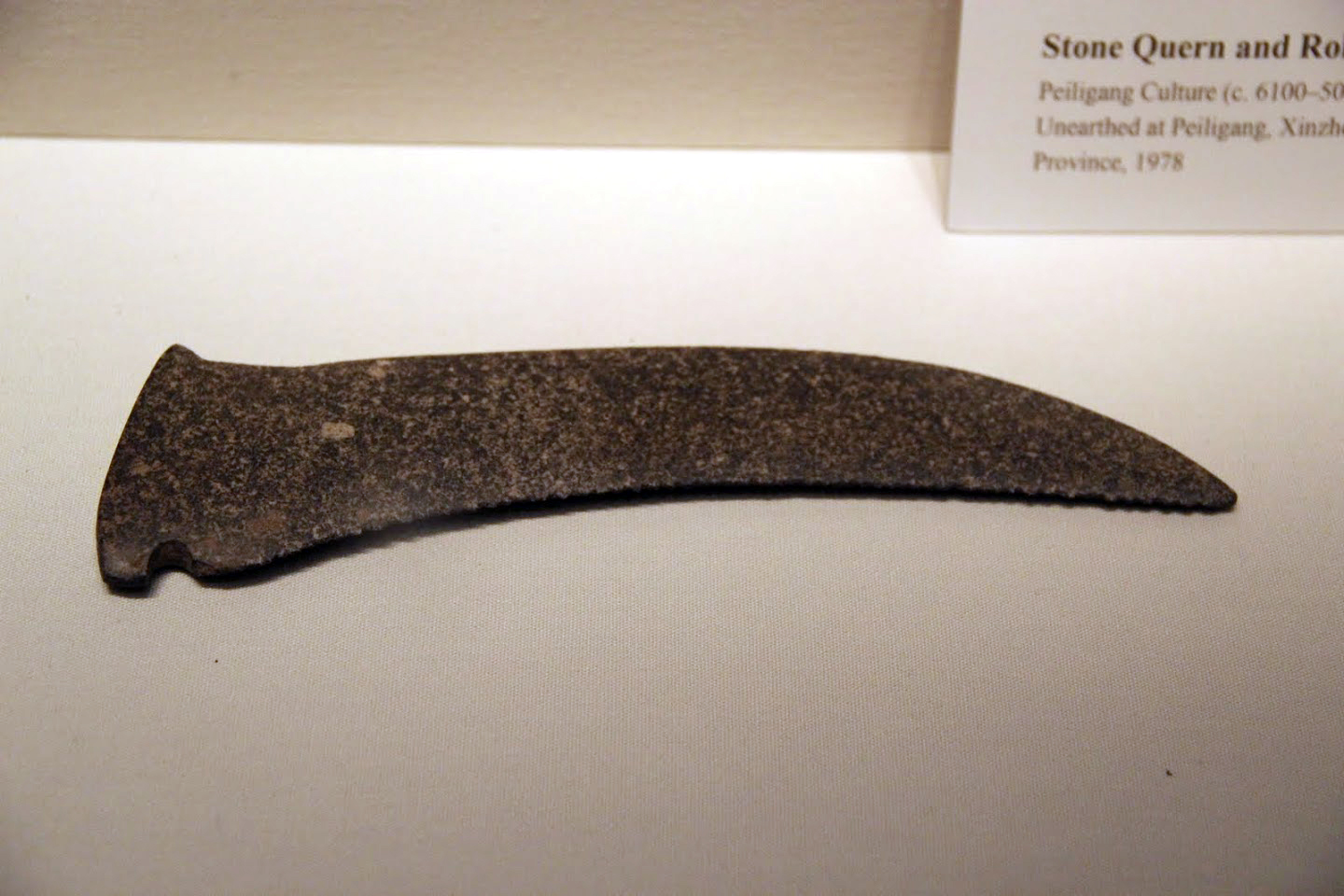
Stone sickle, Peiligang culture (7000–5000 BC)

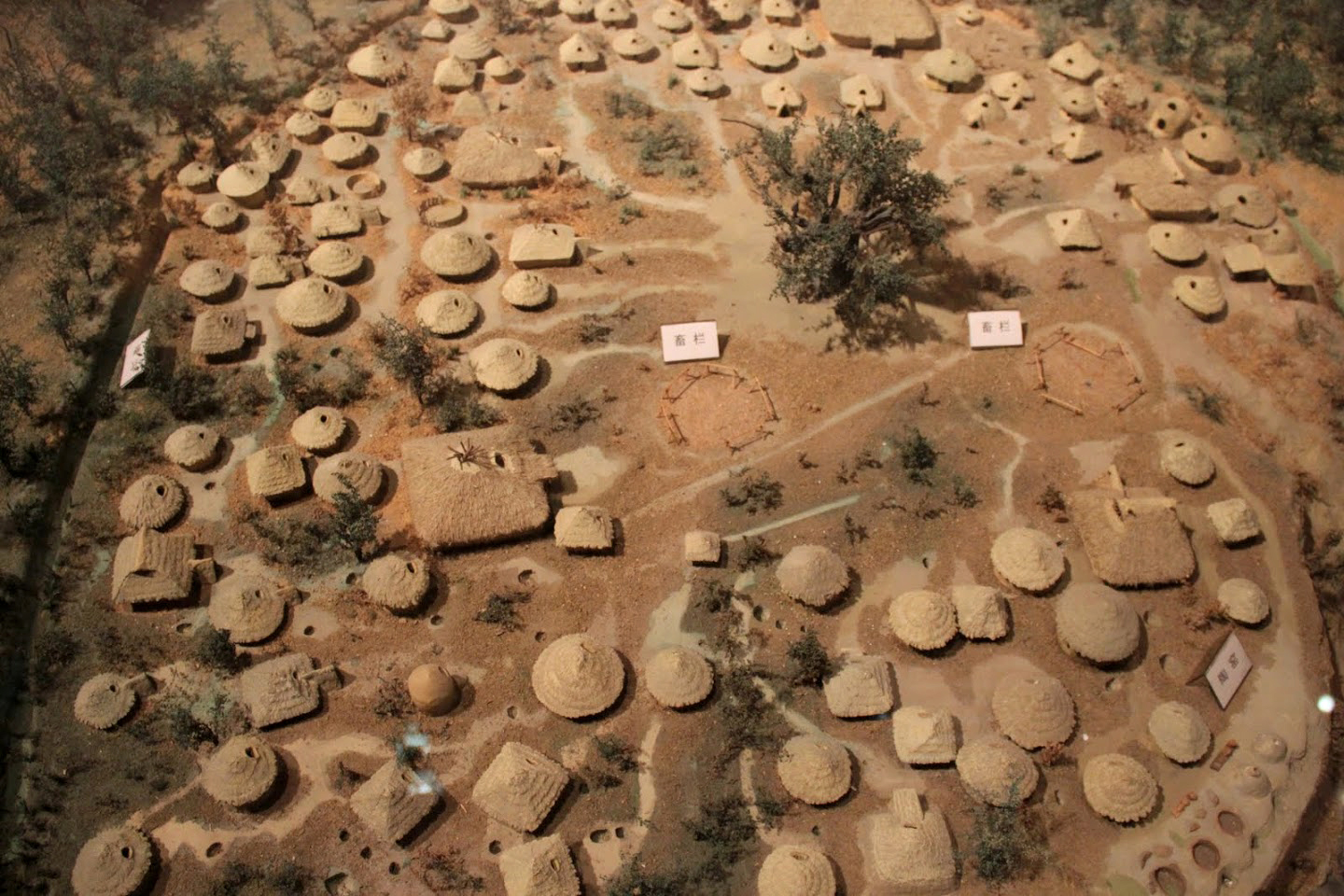
Model of a Yangshao culture village (4800–2500 BC)

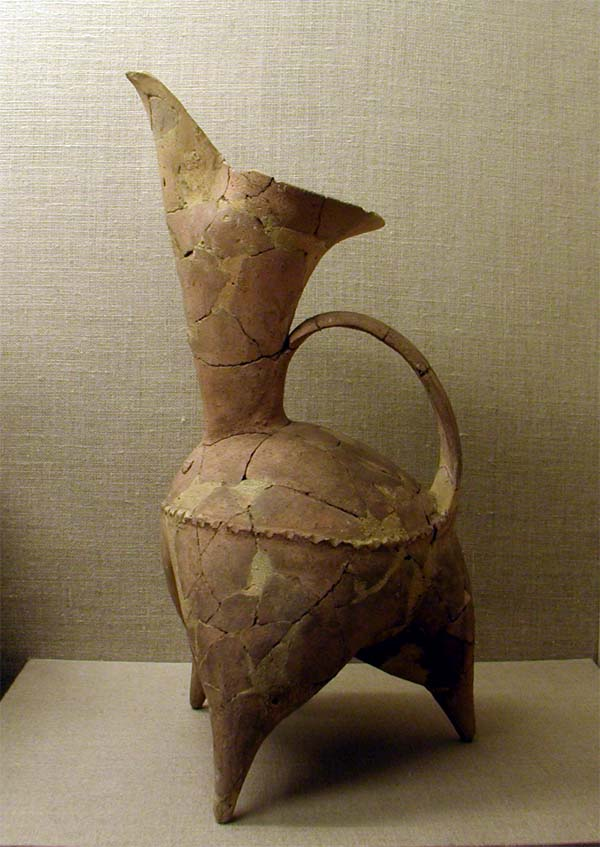
Vessel of the Dawenkou culture (4300–2400 BC）

The Yellow River civilization, Huanghe civilization or Huanghe Valley civilization (Chinese: 黃河文明), Hwan‐huou civilization is an ancient Chinese civilization that prospered in the middle and lower basin of the Yellow River. Agriculture was started in the flood plain of the Yellow River, and before long, through flood control and the irrigation of the Yellow River, cities were developed and political power found reinforcement. One of the "four major civilizations of the ancient world", it is often included in textbooks of East Asian history, but the idea of including only the Yellow River civilization as one of the four biggest ancient civilizations has become outdated as a result of the discovery of other early cultures in China, such as the Yangtze and Liao civilizations. The area saw the Yangshao and Longshan cultures of the Neolithic era and developed into the bronze ware culture of the Shang and Zhou dynasties.

== Cultures ==
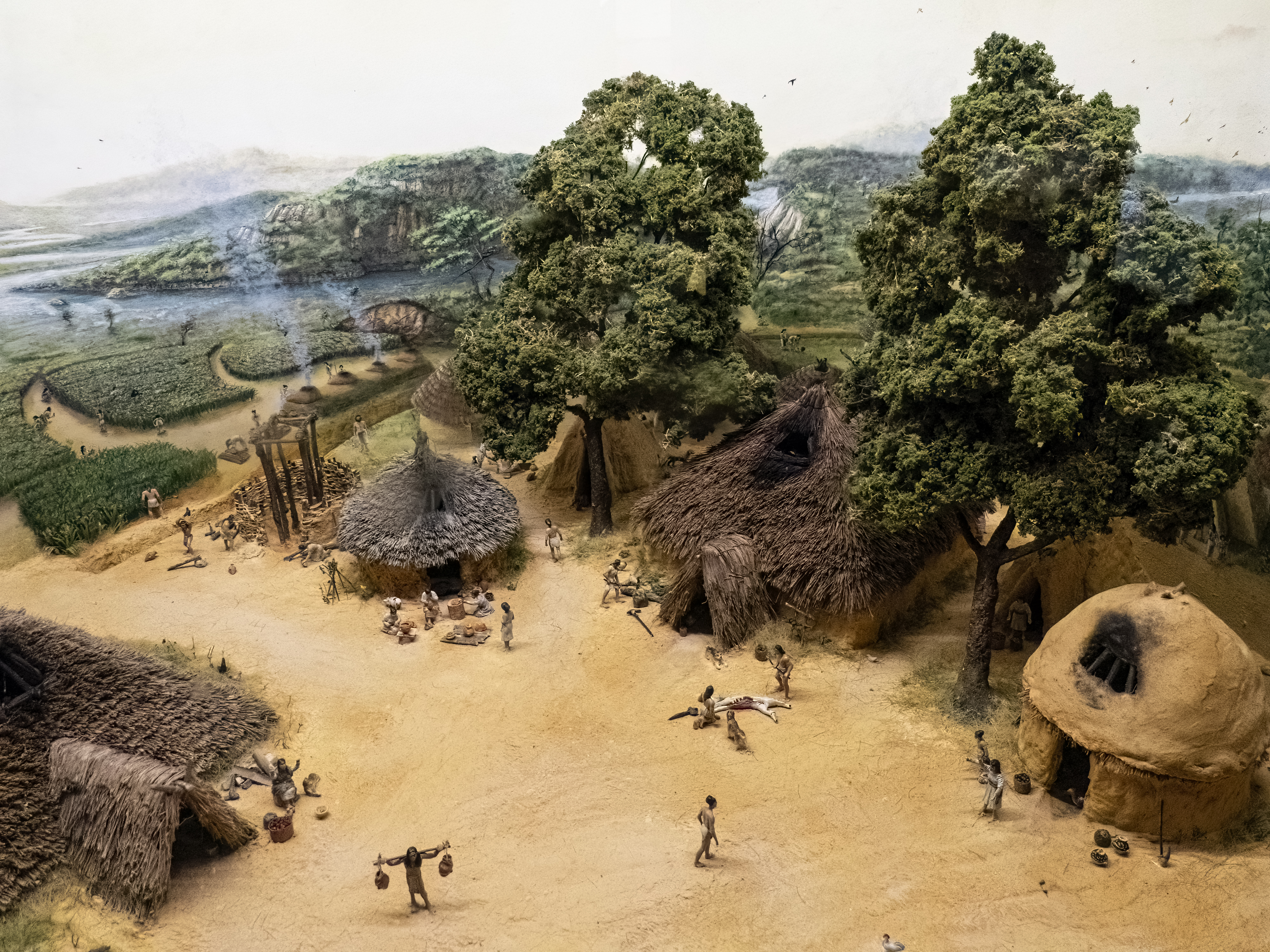
A model of a settlement of the Middle Neolithic in the Yellow River Valley

- Nanzhuangtou (various datings for beginning and end, between 10600 BC and 7500 BC)
- Peiligang culture (7000 BC – 5000 BC)
- Cishan culture (6500 BC – 5000 BC)
- Dadiwan culture (6000 BC – 5000 BC)
- Beixin culture (6000 BC – 5000 BC)
- Yangshao culture (5000 BC – 3000 BC)
- Dawenkou culture (4300 BC – 2400 BC)
- Longshan culture (3000 BC – 1900 BC)
- Shimao culture (2300 BC - 1800 BC)
- Erlitou culture (2000 BC – 1600 BC)
- Erligang culture (1600 BC – 1400 BC)

== See also ==
- Yangtze civilization
- Liao civilization
- Prehistory of China
