= Zhang Weiwei =

Zhang Weiwei is the name of:

- Zhang Weiwei (professor) (born 1957), Chinese political scientist and writer
- Zhang Weiwei (water polo) (born 1990), Chinese water polo player
- Zhang Weiwei (golfer) (born 1997), Chinese professional golfer

== See also ==
- Vivibear (born 1977), Chinese fiction writer, real name Zhang Weiwei
