= The China Wave: Rise of a Civilizational State =

2011 book by Zhang Weiwei

The China Wave
- Author: Zhang Weiwei
- Original title: 中国震撼：一个“文明型国家”的崛起
- Language: Chinese
- Subject: Geopolitics, Chinese Communist Party, Chinese government, Chinese Century, Chinese exceptionalism
- Genre: Non-fiction
- Published: 1 January 2011 (original); 21 March 2012 (English translation)
- Publisher: World Century Publishing Corporation
- Publication place: China
- ISBN: 978-1-938134-00-5 (Hardcover)

The China Wave: Rise of a Civilizational State is a 2011 book by Zhang Weiwei about China's economic and geopolitical rise to the status as an emerging global power. It was originally published in Chinese with the English language version being published in 2012. In the book Zhang argues that China's rapid economic development proves the success of China's model of governance and exceptionalism. Zhang argues that China is unique and exceptional because it is a civilization state. Zhang outlines the concept in the book and argues that it challenges Western assumptions about human rights, good governance, and democracy. The book contends that China should not accept Western political models, otherwise it will lose its advantages and risk disintegration.

The book was a best seller in China.

== See also ==
- China's peaceful rise
- Chinese Century
