= When China Rules the World =

2009 book by Martin Jacques

When China Rules the World...
- Author: Martin Jacques
- Language: English
- Subject: Globalization, Chinese history and culture, international relations, modernity, Chinese Century
- Genre: Non-fiction
- Published: June 2009
- Publication place: United Kingdom / United States
- Media type: Print (Hardcover & Paperback)
- Name (UK): When China Rules the World: The Rise of the Middle Kingdom and the End of the Western World; Name (US): When China Rules the World: The End of the Western World and the Birth of a New Global Order

When China Rules the World: The End of the Western World and the Birth of a New Global Order is a book by British journalist and scholar Martin Jacques. It was released in 2009. Jacques refers to the estimates on China's economic superiority, such as made by Goldman Sachs, and concludes that China's future economic strength will heavily alter the political and cultural landscape of the future world. The book was originally released in the UK under the subtitle "The Rise of the Middle Kingdom and the End of the Western World".

In 2012 it was republished in a "greatly expanded and fully updated" second edition.

== Synopsis ==
For over two hundred years we have lived in a western-made world, one where the very notion of being modern was synonymous with being western. The book argues that the twenty-first century will be different: with the rise of increasingly powerful non-Western countries, the west will no longer be dominant and there will be many ways of being modern. In this new era of ‘contested modernity’ the central player will be China.

Martin Jacques argues that far from becoming a western-style society, China will remain highly distinctive. It is already having a far-reaching and much-discussed economic impact, but its political and cultural influence, which has hitherto been greatly neglected, will be at least as significant.As it rapidly reassumes its traditional place at the centre of East Asia, the old tributary system will resurface in a modern form, contemporary ideas of racial hierarchy will be redrawn and China’s ages-old sense of superiority will reassert itself. China’s rise signals the end of the global dominance of the west and the emergence of a world which it will come to shape in a host of different ways and which will become increasingly disconcerting and unfamiliar to those who live in the west.

== Key arguments ==
1. There is not simply one western modernity, instead we are witnessing the birth of multiple modernities
2. Chinese modernity will be very different from western modernity
3. We are moving into a world of contested modernity
4. China will become the largest economy in the world within less than two decades and then proceed to rapidly out-distance that of the United States
5. China’s impact on the world will not simply be economic; it will also have profound political, cultural and ideological effects
6. For thousands of years, China was at the centre of the tributary-state system in East Asia, which only came to an end with the arrival of European colonialism at the end of the nineteenth century
7. As the East Asian economy is rapidly reconfigured around China, we should expect elements of the tributary system to reappear
8. At its core, China is a civilization-state rather than a nation-state, a fact which will become steadily more apparent
9. The Chinese state is very different from the western state: it has existed for over two thousand years, for over a millennium it has had no competitors (e.g., church, merchants) nor limits to its power; it is regarded with reverence and deference by the Chinese as the guardian and protector of Chinese civilization
10. The Chinese have a deep and living sense of their own culture and civilization which they regard as superior to all others
11. 92% of the Chinese believe that they are of one race, the Han Chinese, unlike the other most populous nations such as India, the United States, Brazil, Indonesia and Turkey which recognize themselves to be highly multi-racial and multi-cultural
12. The similarities between the communist period and the Confucian era are more striking than the differences

== Reception ==
When China Rules the World was the choice of Larry Summers as his travel companion for 2010 World Economic Forum in Davos. Harvard professor Joseph Nye has criticized the American decline narrative of the book, pointing to the different forms of power America can continue to wield and writing in The Future of Power that "America [...] is likely to remain more powerful than any single state in the coming decades, although American economic and cultural preponderence will become less dominant than at the beginning of the century".

The book received high appraisal also from influential political pundits. Fareed Zakaria recommended the title as the book of the week of his show Fareed Zakaria GPS on November 21, 2010. Zakaria noted "China is going to change the western dominated world we are all comfortable with. Whether you agree with it or not, this is a very forcefully written lively book that is full of provocations and predictions." Harvard economic historian Niall Ferguson praised the work in a blurb for the book by writing: "The rise of China may well prove to be the defining economic and geopolitical change of our time, and few authors have given the subject deeper thought or offered a more illuminating analysis than Martin Jacques."

In contrast, Chinese scholar of international relations Xiang Lanxin heavily criticized the book, claiming its "theoretical basis is wrong" and calling the theory of a civilization state an "utter fiction [that] does not stand up at all in scholarly terms."

David Alton reviewed the book for the Journal of International Business Ethics. Alton noted that Jacques is "too willing to overlook the nature of the Chinese political system as he rightly dwells on China's extraordinary growth, economic capacity, and cultural richness", dismissing "concerns for human rights as the West patronizing China". Alton also criticized the book for ignoring the rise of Christianity in China.

The book was also reviewed in several other academic outlets.

== See also ==
- American decline
- Asian Century
- Civilization state
- Power Transition Theory
