= Tianqiao and Chrissy Chen Institute =

Chinese-American non-profit research institute

Coordinates: 34.1409°N 118.1294°W

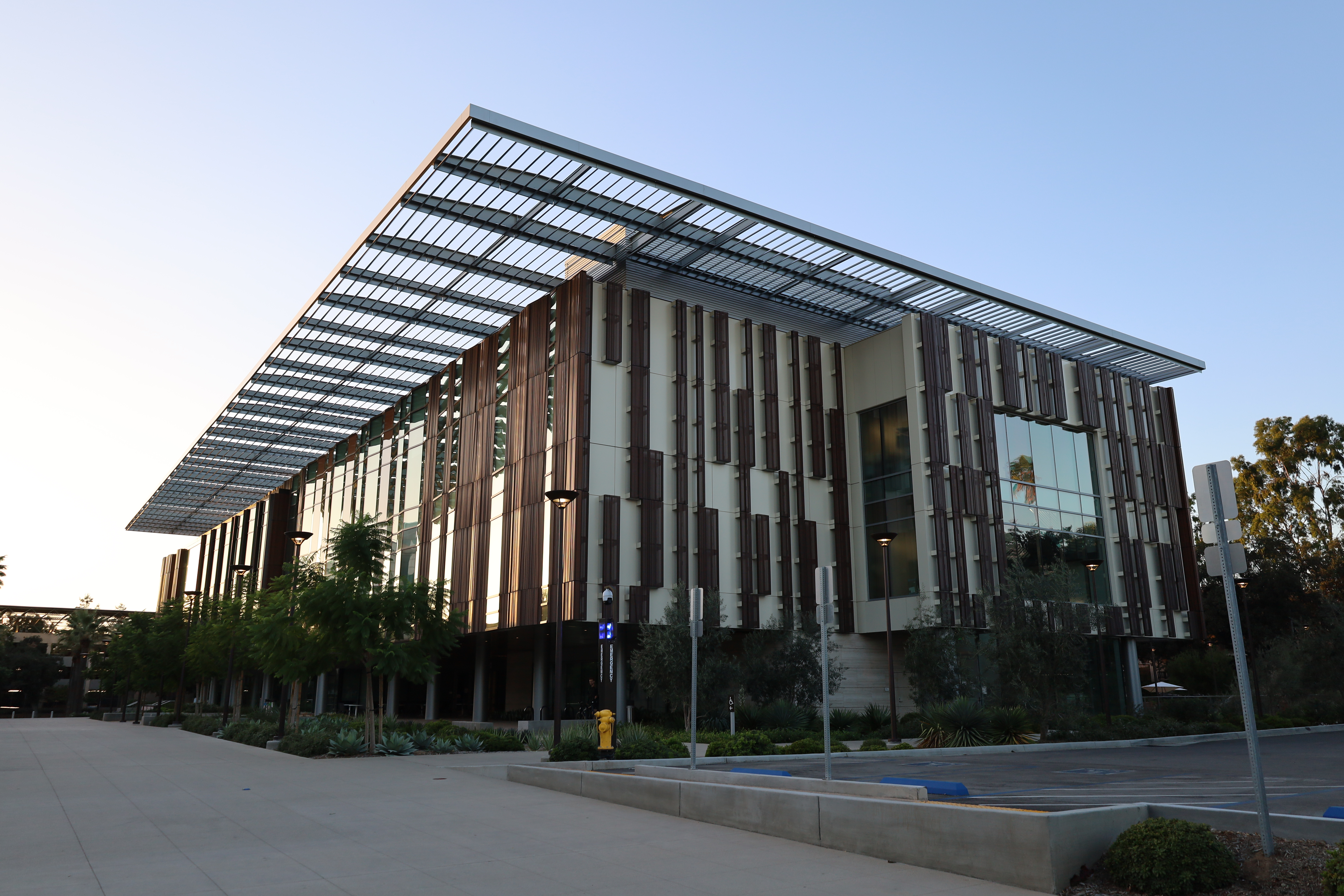
- Tianqiao and Chrissy Chen Neuroscience Research Building at Caltech
- Formation: 2016
- Founder: Tianqiao Chen and Chrissy Luo
- Type: Non-profit institute
- Legal status: Active
- Purpose: Supporting fundamental and translational brain research and development
- Headquarters: Redwood City, California
- Region served: United States, China
- Methods: Endowments and educational programs
- Fields: Neuroscience, artificial intelligence
- Executive director: David Tan
- Affiliations: Zhou Liangfu Foundation, Caltech, Huashan Hospital, Shanghai Mental Health Center
- Endowment: $1 billion (2016)
- Website: cheninstitute.org

The Tianqiao and Chrissy Chen Institute (also referred to as the Chen Institute or TCCI) is a non-profit institute founded by Tianqiao Chen and Chrissy Luo to support human brain research. Formed in 2016 with a funding commitment of US$1 billion, the institute's first donation in 2017 created the Tianqiao and Chrissy Chen Institute for Neuroscience at Caltech, which opened in 2021. The Chen Institute has since founded other institutes and programs as well, including the Tianqiao and Chrissy Chen Institute for Translational Research in Shanghai, the AI brain science laboratory MindX, and the brain computer interface research and development firm NeuroXess, among others.

== History ==
=== Formation (2016) ===
The Chen Institute was founded in 2016 by Chrissy and Tianqiao Chen, married philanthropists known for co-founding the Chinese conglomerate Shanda Group in 1999. The couple decided to create a non-profit institute to fund various brain-related research initiatives and institutions, citing a project by Caltech scientist Richard Andersen as being particularly inspirational. Upon seeing Andersen's mind-machine brain interface help a quadriplegic use thoughts to control a robotic arm on television, they flew from Singapore to Pasadena, California to meet Anderson in person. They subsequently set aside $1 billion to donate to related efforts on brain-related treatment and research and development, creating the Tianqiao and Chrissy Chen Institute. The organization has also been referred to as the T&C Chen Institute, TCCI, and the Chen Institute. Richard Andersen and David J. Anderson were appointed as directors.

=== Caltech (2016-2017) ===
In its first donation, on December 8, 2016, it was announced that the Chen Institute was donating $115 million to fund the formation of the Tianqiao and Chrissy Chen Institute for Neuroscience at Caltech. David J. Anderson was announced as director of the Tianqiao and Chrissy Chen Institute for Neuroscience in August 2017. The Chens stated that they selected Caltech as the first recipient because of the school's entrepreneurial and interdisciplinary approach to the field. The donation resulted in some controversy in Chinese academia, with arguments made that the donations would have been more beneficial to a Chinese university. Other academics defended the donation on the grounds that Chinese universities were often less transparent, noting that the Chens had previously withheld gifts to Chinese institutions when they refused to provide usage reports.

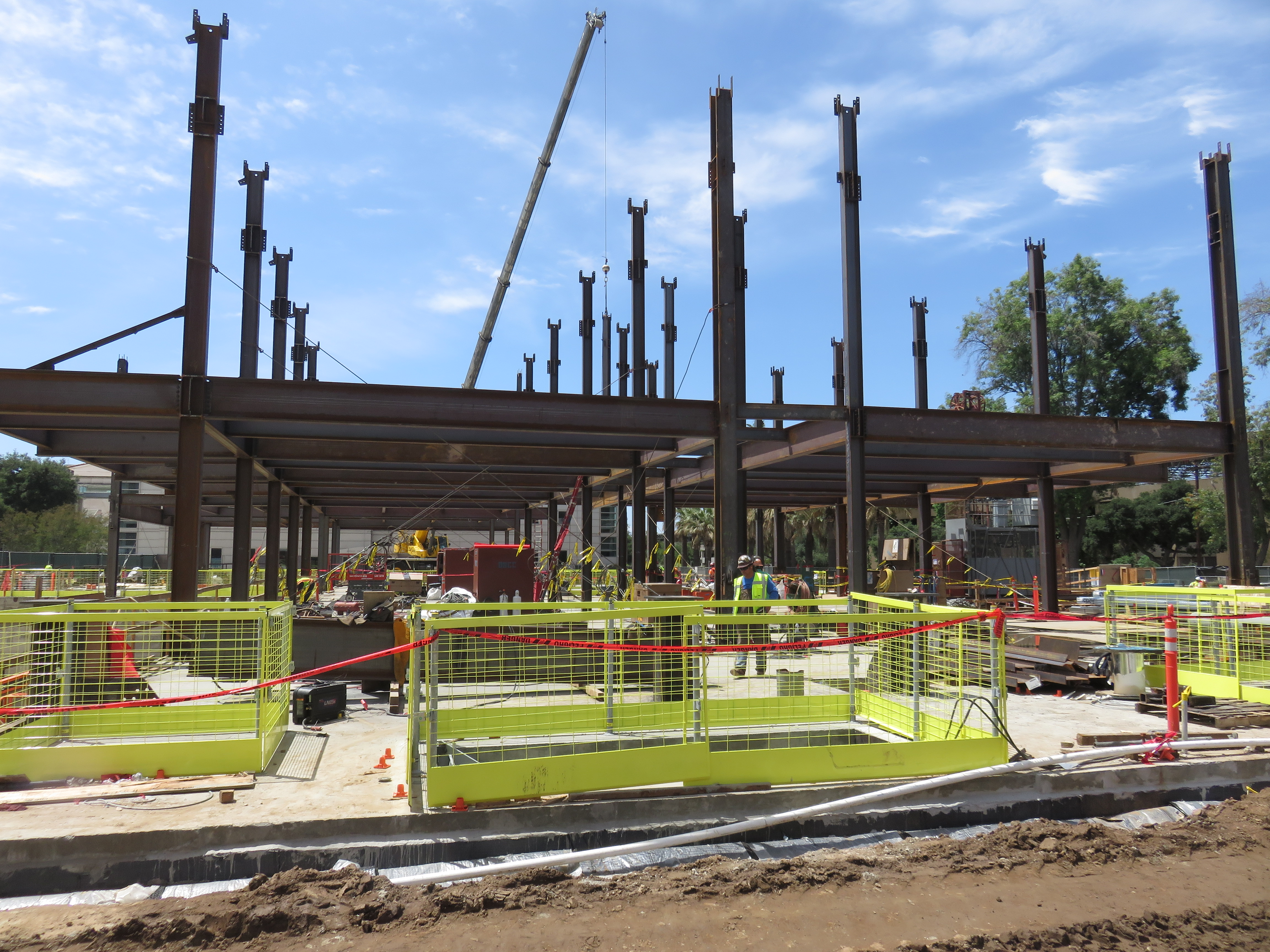
Chen Neuroscience Research Building under construction at Caltech in 2019, two years before completion

Funds were set aside to establish the Chen Neuroscience Research Building, the new institute's research and administration building, and also to provide Caltech with continuous resources for neuroscience research, with direction of that research to be decided by the university. The university explained that the research complex would combine "biology, engineering, chemistry, physics, computer science and the social sciences to tackle brain function in an integrated, comprehensive way." The groundbreaking of the research building took place in December 2017. Construction began in January 2018, and the building opened in January 2021.

=== New institutes (2017-2021) ===
In November 2017, the Tianqiao and Chrissy Chen Institute announced that $80 million would fund The Tianqiao and Chrissy Chen Institute (Shanghai). The nonprofit brain disease institute was formed as a partnership with Huashan Hospital in Shanghai, which in turn is affiliated with Fudan University, and Zhou Liangfu Foundation. With Mao Ying appointed director, the institute announced a focus on international collaboration and brain disease research, with plans to study "brain tumors, Alzheimer's disease, Parkinson's disease, depression and other brain ailments." The Shanghai institute was later renamed the Tianqiao and Chrissy Chen Institute for Translational Research.

In June 2018, the Chen Institute announced that it was partnering with the Shanghai Mental Health Center to fund the study of mental illness. In October 2020, the Chen Institute opened the Chen Frontier Lab for Brain Research at Huashan Hospital's Hongqiao Campus in Shanghai, with plans to work in the fields such as BMI, sleep, and digital medicine.

In July 2021, the Chen Institute signed an agreement with Shanghai Mental Health Center to open the Chen Frontier Lab for AI and Mental Health, its second Chen Frontier Lab.

=== AI expansion (2022-2025) ===
The Chen Institute was increasingly funding artificial intelligence-related neuroscience projects by 2023. It had founded the brain computer interface (BCI) research and development firm NeuroXess, as well as the Chen Frontier Lab for Applied Neurotechnology, with Gerwin Schalk as director. In 2023, the Chen Institute announced it would invest US$138 million in supporting the integration of AI and brain science. It outlined plans to set up MindX, an AI brain science laboratory. Also in 2023, the Chen Institute announced a series of AI university competitions as part of its AI for Brain Science program.

In 2024, the Chen Institute co-organized a joint meeting with the Brain-Computer Interface Society on developments in BCIs.

The Tianqiao and Chrissy Chen Ideation and Prototyping Lab opened at Stanford University in 2025.

== Focus and methods ==
The Tianqiao and Chrissy Chen Institute funds universities and institutions in forms such as endowed institutes, grants for researchers, professorships, or "topic-specific programs" for scientists. The Chen Institute also has a series of training programs in relation to AI-driven scientific research, including at the University of Tokyo.

The institute supports interdisciplinary research concerning neuroscience, particularly research on brain mechanics, perception, and the impact of perception on behavior and well-being. In particular, the institute aims to support fundamental brain research with a focus on "understanding the sensation-perception mechanisms and related systems of memory, attention, learning and expectations." Co-founder Tianqiao Chen has explained that "the key of [the institute's] philanthropy vision" is furthering understanding of perception, arguing that such research would help people master negative emotions and pain.

== Programs and institutions ==
- The Tianqiao and Chrissy Chen Institute for Neuroscience at Caltech
  - The Caltech Brain Imaging Center
  - The Chen Center for Data Science and Artificial Intelligence (DataSAI)
  - The T&C Chen Center for Systems Neuroscience
  - The T&C Chen Brain-Machine Interface Center
  - The T&C Chen Center for Social and Decision Neuroscience
  - The Center for Molecular and Cellular Neuroscience
- The Tianqiao and Chrissy Chen Institute for Translational Research
  - Chen Frontier Lab for Brain Research
  - Chen Frontier Lab for AI and Mental Health
  - Chen Frontier Lab for Applied Neurotechnology
- The Tianqiao and Chrissy Chen Ideation and Prototyping Lab at Stanford

== Research ==
Since its inception, researchers at the Tianqiao and Chrissy Chen Institute at Caltech have published research on topics such as aiding paralyzed patients feel sensation, the neural processes associated with fear, deciphering how the brain manages thirst, the mechanisms behind memory recollection, the neural codes for body movements, and others. A number of Tianqiao and Chrissy Chen Institute researchers have received awards for their work.

== Documentary ==
The institute commissioned the documentary Minds Wide Open, which aired on the Discovery Channel in 2018. Barron's wrote that it "builds a case for why scientists need to focus on very basic questions of how the brain works." The film won Gold Awards in the 2018 Cannes Corporate Media & TV Award film categories of medical, educational, and science and technology.
