= Chen Tianqiao =

Chinese businessman

- 陈天桥
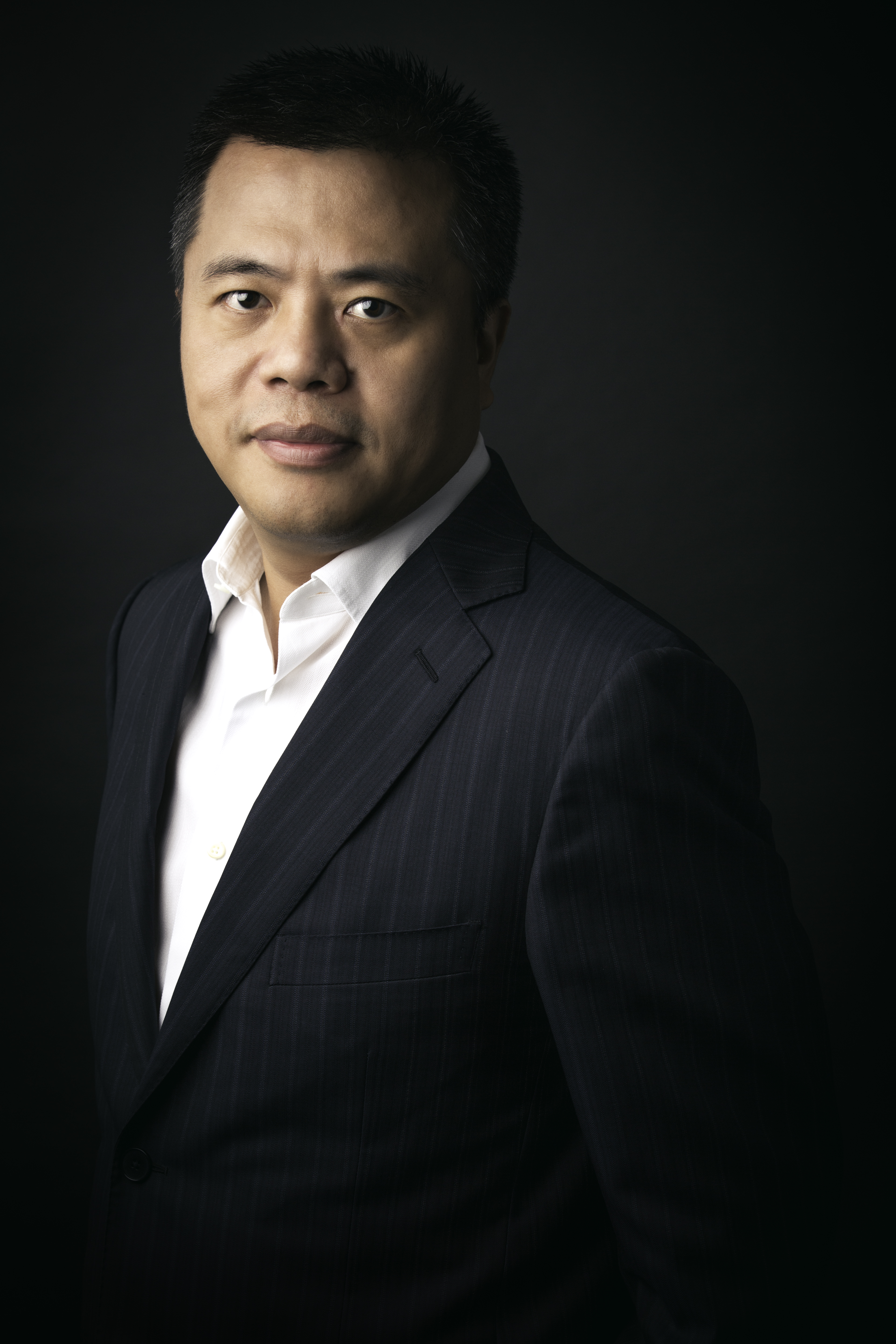
- Chen in 2015
- Born: 1973 (age 52–53); Xinchang County, Zhejiang, China
- Education: Fudan University
- Occupations: Co-founder of Shanda Group and Tianqiao and Chrissy Chen Institute
- Organization(s): Member of the 11th and 12th National Committees of the Chinese People's Political Consultative Conference
- Political party: Chinese Communist Party
- Spouse: Chrissy Luo

Chen Tianqiao (Chinese: 陈天桥; pinyin: Chén Tiānqiáo); born 1973) is a Chinese businessman who founded Shanda Group.

== Early life and education ==
Chen was born in Xinchang County, Zhejiang Province, China in 1973 and grew up near Shanghai with his younger brother Danian. His father was an engineer and his mother was a middle school English teacher. He earned his bachelor's degree in economics from Fudan University in 1993.

== Career ==
Chen started at the state-owned property developer Shanghai Lujiazui Group in 1994, holding management positions in the public relations office before becoming secretary to the chairman. In 1998, he became the vice director of the office of the president at Kinghing Trust & Investment before resigning in 1999.

In 1999, Chen started the online gaming company Shanda with members of his family. The company went on to become the largest Internet company by market capitalization in China in 2004. That same year, Chen was second on the Hurun Report's "rich list", was voted China Central Television's "Rising Business Star", and was featured in MIT Technology Review's Innovators Under 35 list.

Shanda Group went private in early 2012, with Chen, his wife, and his brother keeping a combined 57% stake. In 2015, Chen, as the beneficial owner of Shanda Asset Management, acquired over 80,127 hectares of land in Oregon from Fidelity National Financial for US$85 million, making him one of the largest foreign owners of land in the United States.

In November 2014, Shanda Interactive completed the sale of its controlling interest in Shanda Games, and Chen resigned as a director and chairman of the company's board.

With Chen remaining chairman and CEO, by early 2017, Shanda Group was the largest shareholder of Legg Mason, Lending Club, and Community Health Systems. It also had property operations in China and North America and stakes in companies such as Sotheby's. Shanda sold its stakes in Sotheby's in 2017 and then it sold its stake Legg Mason later that year, and then Chen resigned as vice-chairman of the Legg Mason board. Chen has invested in the venture funds Propel(x) and Ubiquity Ventures.

Ranked on various rich lists, Chen personally had $4 billion in net value in 2017 and was ranked as the 93rd richest person in China, according to the Hurun Report.

In 2018, Chen purchased 500,000 acres in Oregon. The same year, the Committee of 100 gave Chen an award for Lifetime Achievement as Tech Entrepreneur.

In 2026, Chen said he and Shanda Group had committed more than US$2 billion to artificial intelligence research, including US$1 billion earmarked for data processing and computing infrastructure. He described the goal as building AI systems capable of generating new knowledge and forecasting complex events through long-term memory, causal reasoning, and predictive modeling.

== Politics ==
According to China Youth Daily, Chen joined the Chinese Communist Party at age 18 and was elected to the central committee of Communist Youth League of China in Shanghai. In 2008, Chen was appointed to the 11th National Committee of the Chinese People's Political Consultative Conference (CPPCC). In 2013, Chen was appointed to the 12th National Committee of the CPPCC. He resigned from the CPPCC in 2018.

== Personal life ==
Chen is married to Qianqian "Chrissy" Luo. They moved from Shanghai to Singapore in 2009, then from Singapore to the Bay Area of California in late 2017. They are currently residents of Menlo Park, California.

Chen has said publicly that he began experiencing panic attacks in 2004, shortly after Shanda's Nasdaq listing, and that a second, more severe episode in 2009 contributed to his decision to step back from running the company. He described these experiences as a motivation for his later funding of brain research.

In 2018, Chen bought a historic mansion built for Alice Gwynne Vanderbilt in 1881 on East 69th Street on the Upper East Side of Manhattan for $39 million.
