= Guancha =

Chinese news website

Guancha.cn
- Native name: 观察者网
- Website type: News website
- Available in: Chinese
- Headquarters: Shanghai
- Country of origin: China
- Owners: Shanghai Guanchazhe Information Technology Co., Ltd.; Shanghai Chunqiu Development Strategy Research Institute
- Founder: Eric X. Li
- Key people: Zhang Weiwei
- Website: www.guancha.cn
- Commercial: Yes
- Registration: Optional
- Launched: 2012; 14 years ago
- Current status: Active

Guancha.cn (Chinese: 观察者网; lit. 'Observer Net') is a Shanghai-based news site founded in 2012 by Eric X. Li, a venture capitalist and political scientist at Fudan University. It has been described by analysts as "one of China's most popular and influential online media portals."

Guancha's logotype as displayed on its homepage.

== History ==
Guancha was launched in 2012 in Shanghai. Before its founding, an online platform known as "Social Observer" had been established in 2010 by Shanghai Chunqiu Development Strategy Research Institute. This early platform has been described as Guancha's predecessor.

Throughout the 2010s and 2020s, Guancha has played a visible role in Chinese online discourse. A key event during this period was its coverage of Guancha-cofounder Zhang Weiwei's 2011 debate with Francis Fukuyama, in which Zhang promoted the "Chinese model" and questioned Western liberal democracy. In 2013, prominent Chinese political commentators associated with the Industrial Party began contributing to the site. In 2020, Guancha criticized the suspension of Donald Trump's Twitter account, with one article describing Trump as a "key driver of clicks" for the site.

Guancha founder Eric Li.

Guancha has also reported on international business controversies. In 2021, the site covered Intel's decision to avoid sourcing components from Xinjiang and criticized the move. In 2024, Guancha's coverage included criticism of stand-up comedian Yang Li, which was widely discussed on Chinese social media.

== Reception ==
Guancha has been referenced in academic and policy research on Chinese digital media as a significant outlet for public commentary and news aggregation. Guancha generally reflects a pro-Chinese government political perspective. Some Western media have characterized Guancha as nationalist, with some academics describing it as ultra-nationalist. Guancha regularly hosts essays by prominent Chinese academics and public intellectuals. For example, Fudan University professor and Xi Jinping-advisor Zhang Weiwei has published widely read commentaries on the platform that are then cited in international think-tank analysis of Chinese elite discourse.
