= WiFi Master Key =

Wifi sharing software

WiFi Master
- Developer: LinkSure
- Stable release: Android 4.1.12 iOS 3.3.6
- Operating system: Android, iOS
- Available in: Multilingual, 19 languages
- Type: Tools
- License: Freeware
- Website: wifi.com

WiFi Master (formerly WiFi Master Key) is a peer-to-peer Wi-Fi sharing mobile application software for free Wi-Fi access developed by LinkSure Network. It uses cloud computing, big data and principles of the sharing economy. The company's founder and CEO, Chen Danian, was previously CEO and co-founder of Shanda.

WiFi Master was first released in 2012, and by 2016 had become the world’s largest Wi-Fi sharing app, with over 900 million users and 520 million monthly active users.

The founder claimed in 2016 that WiFi Master was ranked 5th in the world. According to 2017 statistics WiFi Master was the 3rd largest software app in China after WeChat and Tencent QQ.

== History ==
In September 2012, WiFi Master was first launched in China. Founder Chen Danian has said WiFi Master was created by in hopes of 'bridging the digital divide and to help people achieve self-actualization by granting them access to free Internet'.

In 2015, its operating company, LinkSure closed a funding round of USD $52 million, and became a unicorn company in the mobile internet industry. In May 2015, LinkSure bought the domain name wifi.com and established a branch in Singapore to expand its overseas services. WiFi Master was launched worldwide, rapidly gaining popularity in Southeast Asia.

In 2016, WiFi Master became the world’s largest WiFi sharing community, providing over 4 billion daily average connections with a successful connection rate of over 80% worldwide. WiFi Master is available in 223 countries, and is the top Tools app on the Google Play Store in 49 countries.

In 2019, WiFi Master Key rebranded as WiFi Master.

== Features ==
The application's core function, Wifi Search, allows for users to find and connect to available nearby Wi-Fi hotspots. In 2016, WiFi Master introduced a WiFi Map function in the app for users to find open hotspots.

WiFi Master incorporated a WiFi Security Matrix for heightened security during the connection. It includes a Cloud Security Detection System (Chinese: 安全云感知系统) to help users detect possible Wi-Fi security risks in advance based on big data tracking. The system also applies machine learning algorithms in real-time to track predicted 'risky' Wi-Fi hotspots. WiFi Master has a Security Tunnel Protection System (Chinese: 安全隧道保护系统) to provide users with fundamental protection during each Wi-Fi connection. The system uses encrypted hierarchical transmission, malicious attack real-time monitoring, and attack interception to encrypt users’ information.

In September 2015, WiFi Master’s announced that its users in China were been insured by WiFi Security Insurance (WiFi安全险), launched by LinkSure in partnership with ZhongAn Insurance (Chinese: 众安保险), in the event of a network security issue.

== Awards ==
WiFi Master won the “Product with the Most Growth” at the 2017 iResearch Awards in June 2017.
