= Eric Li (disambiguation) =

Eric Li may refer to:

- Li Shufu or Eric Li Shufu (李书福), Chinese businessman, CEO of Geely Group
- Eric Li (李家祥), former Hong Kong Legislative Council member
- Eric X. Li, also known as Li Shimo (李世默), Chinese venture capitalist and political scientist, founder of Guancha
