= Chinese exceptionalism =

View of China's developmental model

Chinese exceptionalism (Chinese: 中国例外主义; pinyin: Zhōngguó lìwài zhǔyì) is the belief that China is either distinctive, unique, or exemplary compared to other nations. Clarissa Tan described Zhang Weiwei and Eric X. Li as Chinese exceptionalists who argue that the China model is the right path for China, a civilization state. According to Tan, this view has become increasingly popular. The Chinese government has recruited Chinese exceptionalism into its notion of a "peaceful rise." According to John M. Friend and Bradley A. Thayer, within Han nationalist narrative, Han culture is considered to be the authentic character of the Chinese nation; to deviate from the Han identity will only tarnish Chinese exceptionalism and impede China's rise.

According to the abstract of a 2013 book chapter by Feng Zhang, "Although exceptionalism is an important dimension of China's foreign policy, it has not been a subject of serious scholarly research. This chapter examines the manifestations and sources of contemporary Chinese exceptionalism and explains its implications for foreign policy. Chinese exceptionalism is defined by great power reformism, benevolent pacifism, and harmonious inclusionism. While resting on an important factual basis, it is constructed by mixing facts with myths through selective use of China's vast historical and cultural experiences. Exceptionalism does not determine policy, but by being an essential part of the worldview of the Chinese government and many intellectuals, it can become an important source for policy ideas. It can also be viewed as a normative theory for China's foreign policy, as one among six major schools competing for ideational influence in China's foreign policy formation."

In advocating for a form of Chinese exceptionalism for the country's development, Chinese leader Xi Jinping states, "China's unique cultural tradition, unique historic fate, and unique national conditions have determined that China must follow the road of development that fits Chinese characteristics." In this view, because every country is exceptional in its own way, each should choose its own model, including the possibility of taking inspiration from the Chinese model as an alternative to liberal democracy.

== See also ==
- American exceptionalism
- Celestial Empire
- Chinese nationalism
- Community of Common Destiny
- Han chauvinism
- Sinocentrism
- Tianxia
