= Zhang Weiwei (professor) =

Chinese political scientist

- 张维为
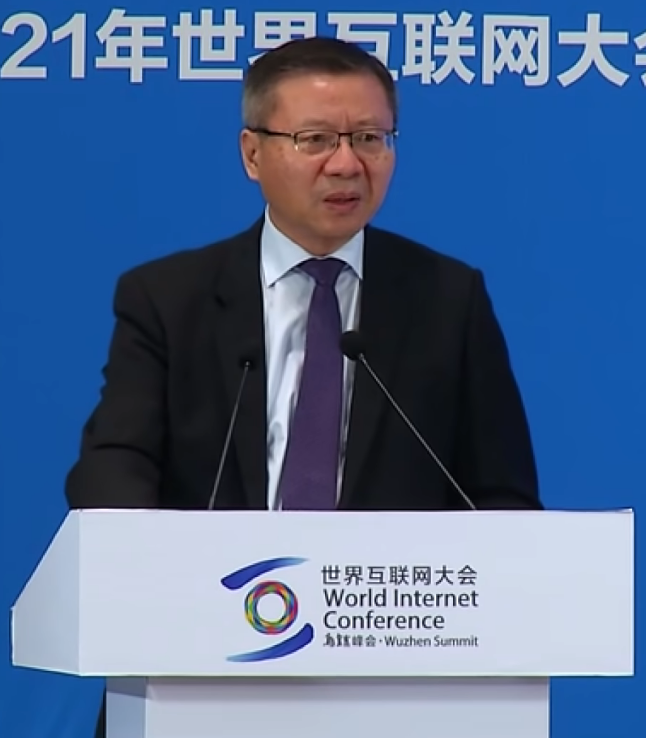
- Zhang in 2021
- Born: December 25, 1958 (age 67); Shanghai, China

Education
- Education: Fudan University (BA); Beijing Foreign Studies University (MA); Graduate Institute of International Studies (MA, PhD)
- Thesis: Ideological Trends and Economic Reform in China, (1978-1993) (1994)
- Doctoral advisor: Gilbert Etienne

Philosophical work
- School: Chinese exceptionalism
- Institutions: China Institute, Fudan University
- Main interests: Developing nations Governance; International political economy Nation-building and democratization Strategic and security issues
- Notable works: The China Wave: Rise of a Civilizational State
- Notable ideas: Arab Winter; The End of the End of History

Bilibili information
- Channel: 张维为
- Years active: 2021–present
- Genre: Political commentary
- Followers: 1.28 million
- Last updated: 2 March 2026

Zhang Weiwei (simplified Chinese: 张维为; traditional Chinese: 張維為; pinyin: Zhāng Wéiwèi) is a Chinese professor of international relations at Fudan University and the director of its China Institute. Zhang is also an Internet celebrity, spreading his political ideas through online video platforms such as Xigua Video, Bilibili, TikTok and YouTube.

Zhang is a strong defender of China's political and economic system. Therefore, he is favored by Chinese leader Xi Jinping. Some of his political views, such as the "superiority of the China Model" and that the Belt and Road Initiative is a "major transformation unprecedented in five thousand years" have been criticized by scholars such as Xiang Lanxin for not being in line with historical facts.

== Early life ==
Zhang is the youngest of six siblings in his family. During the Cultural Revolution (1966–1976), his older siblings all went to the Xinjiang Production and Construction Corps while he stayed in Shanghai because of a policy. In 1975, at the age of 17, he was recruited into the No.2 Shanghai Carving Factory (上海雕刻二厂) as a worker and jade carving apprentice.

== Education ==
Soon after, the college entrance examinations resumed with the end of the Cultural Revolution, and in 1977 Zhang was admitted to the foreign languages department of Fudan University, where he persuaded the dean to sit in on courses in international politics. From 1981 to 1983, Zhang was a postgraduate student at Beijing Foreign Studies University, studying translation.

In 1988, Zhang went to the University of Geneva-affiliated Graduate Institute of International Studies for a master's degree in international relations (1990) and then pursued a PhD, which he received in 1994.

== Career ==
=== Interpreter ===
From 1983 to 1988, Zhang was one of many English interpreters of the Chinese Foreign Ministry, worked for some Chinese leaders, including Deng Xiaoping and Li Peng, in the mid-1980s.

=== Academia ===
Zhang has written extensively in English and Chinese on People's Republic of China's reform and opening up and political reform, China's development model and comparative politics. Zhang is among the major proponents of a "Chinese model", which he defines as a blend of a planned economy with market mechanisms and a top-down governance structure complemented by some grassroots electoral participation.

He expanded on the concept of a civilization state with his book The China Wave: Rise of a Civilizational State (2012). Zhang writes that China should not accept Western political models, which he contends would cause it to lose its advantages and risk disintegration. The book was a bestseller in China.

Zhang is a Senior research fellow at the Chunqiu Institute, a think tank in Shanghai.

Zhang is the head of Fudan University's China Institute.

Previously, he was a professor at the unaccredited, for-profit Geneva School of Diplomacy and International Relations in Switzerland, a fact that the Chinese political scientist Xiang Lanxin mocked in an interview with the blog publication Reading the China Dream.

=== TV ===
Since 2019, Zhang has been the host of "This is China" (这就是中国), a lecture on the virtues of the Chinese government, launched by Dragon Television, a state-run TV channel.

=== Reception ===
Zhang's Bilibili channel has more than 1.28 million subscribers as of 2 March 2026.

The New York Times characterized Zhang as a propagandist-academic.

== Political views ==
External videos
- Is Democracy Wrong for China? (Al Jazeera, 2015)
- Is China an Alternative to Western democracy? (The Nexus Institute, 2018)
- Dialogue between Kishore Mahbubani and Zhang WeiWei (Guan Video, 2018)
- Dialogue with Zhang WeiWei (The Munk Debates, 2020)
- Self-Confidence Matters: A Chinese Perspective on The Rise of China(Zhang Weiwei, 2021)

Zhang emphasizes what he sees as the unique features of China's political practices and culture. He encourages Chinese to develop "self-confidence" in these areas and to "no longer be subservient to the Western discourse." According to Zhang, Chinese should be more vocal in praising their country's system and its benefits tell China's story with pride in order to increase its discourse power.

Zhang contends that China should eliminate the influence of its "Spiritual Americans," by which he refers to Chinese, particularly intellectual elites, who he deems as having been "infiltrated" in the 1980s by Western discourse, standards, and the Western sense of culture. According to Zhang:

One of the most common forms of Western discourse and cultural infiltration of China is to instill certain ‘aesthetic standards’ (审美标准) into Chinese intellectual elites through various forms of exchange or awards, and then to use these Westernized intellectual elites to monopolize Chinese aesthetic standards, and even Chinese standards in the humanities, arts, and social sciences – in this way achieving a kind of ‘cultural training’ and ‘ideological hegemony’ (意识形态霸权) over China.

Zhang describes the Western system as having its own merits and defects, "but its systemic defects now start to eat away its strengths". Zhang criticizes Western liberal democracy. He states that "U.S. democracy is deeply flawed" and produces third-rate leaders like George W. Bush. Zhang also contends that democracy is destroying the United States because it institutionalizes political gridlock and trivializes decision-making.

Zhang contrast the American approach to democracy, which he describes as a democracy of a few interest groups led by oligarchs, with the China model. Zhang is a proponent of the China model. He promotes the idea of Chinese socialist democracy, which he describes as a combination of "selective democracy" and electoral democracy. Zhang's view is that Chinese socialist democracy outperforms "Western procedural democracy" because the Western approach is insufficient to choose trustworthy leaders and the Chinese approach is more meritocratic. Zhang also points to China's long-term stability and economic growth as further evidence of what he believes is the superiority of its system.

Zhang believes that "good governance" should be the main standard for evaluating political systems rather than their normative underpinnings.

According to Zhang, the concept of political party in the Western context does not apply to the CCP. The CCP is a ruling group that follows Chinese political traditions and represents the interests of a nation as a whole.

On May 17, 2016, Zhang attended the National Symposium on the Work of Philosophy and Social Sciences chaired by CCP general secretary Xi Jinping. On May 31, 2021, Zhang gave a lecture to the Politburo of the CCP on strengthening China's international propaganda.

== Works ==
=== Books ===
- Zhang, Weiwei (1996). Ideology and Economic Reform under Deng Xiaoping. London: Kegan Paul. ISBN 9780710305268.
- Zhang, Weiwei (1999). 英汉同声传译 [English-Chinese Simultaneous Interpretation]. Beijing: China Translation & Publishing Corporation. ISBN 9787500105824.
- Zhang, Weiwei (2000). Transforming China: Economic Reform and its Political Implications. London: Palgrave Macmillan. ISBN 9781349408474.
- Zhang, Weiwei (2006). Reshaping Cross-Strait Relations: Ideas and Reflections. Geneva: CAS.
- Zhang, Weiwei (2008). 中国触动全球 [China Touches the World]. Beijing: Xinhua Press. ISBN 9787501185306.
- Zhang, Weiwei (2012). The China Wave: Rise of a Civilizational State. World Century Publishing Corporation. ISBN 978-1938134012.
- Zhang, Weiwei (2012). New Challenges and Perspectives of China: Where is China Going?. Beijing: Foreign Languages Press. ISBN 978-7119073613.
- Zhang, Weiwei (2015). The China Horizon: Glory and Dream of a Civilizational State. World Century Publishing Corporation. ISBN 978-1938134739.
- Zhang, Weiwei (2015). 国际视野下的中国道路和中国梦 [The Chinese Way and the Chinese Dream in an International Perspective]. Beijing: Xuexi Chubanshe. ISBN 9787514705348.
- Zhang, Weiwei (2017). 中国人，你要自信 [Chinese, Be Confident]. Beijing: CITIC. ISBN 9787508678894.
- Zhang, Weiwei (2020). 中国特色社会主义 [Socialism with Chinese Characteristics]. Shanghai: Shanghai People's Publishing House. ISBN 9787208159778.
- Zhang, Weiwei (2020). 中国战疫！ [China Fight the Pandemic!]. Shanghai: Shanghai People's Publishing House. ISBN 9787208164857.
- Zhang, Weiwei (2021). 新百年 新中国 [China in the New Era]. Beijing: Dongfang Chubanshe. ISBN 9787520719032.

== Articles ==
- Zhang, W. (2005). Overseas Chinese and the Concept of "Greater China". Refugee Survey Quarterly, 24(4), 65–73.
- Zhang, W. (2006). Long-term Outlook for China’s Political Reform. Asia Europe Journal, 4(2), 151–175.

=== Essays ===
- Zhang Weiwei (December 9, 1994). "Dengist China After Deng? Not Certain But Likely". The New York Times.
- Zhang Weiwei (November 1, 2006). "The Allure of the Chinese Model". The New York Times.
- Zhang Weiwei (September 30, 2009). "Eight Ideas Behind China's Success". The New York Times.
- Zhang Weiwei (November 12, 2012). "Meritocracy Versus Democracy". The New York Times.
- Zhang Weiwei (March 5, 2013). "China and the End of the End of History". The Globalist.
- Zhang Weiwei (February 10, 2014). "Respect China's Red Lines". Huffington Post.
- Zhang Weiwei (February 26, 2014). "The Five Reasons Why China Works". Huffington Post.
- Zhang Weiwei (May 5, 2014). "China's Success Due to Rejecting Both Market and Democracy Fundamentalism". Huffington Post.
- Zhang Weiwei (October 22, 2014). "Misled Democracy Could Jeopardize Hong Kong's Future". Huffington Post.
- Zhang Weiwei (March 1, 2017). "For China's One-Party Rulers, Legitimacy Flows from Prosperity and Competence". Zócalo Public Square.
- Zhang Weiwei (March 3, 2017). "In China, Unlike Trump's America, Political Legitimacy Is Built On Competence And Experience". Huffington Post.
