= Martin Jacques =

British academic and writer (born 1945)

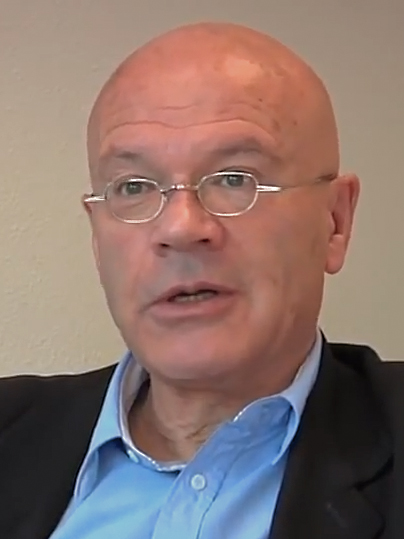
- Jacques in 2012
- Born: 1945 (age 80–81); Coventry, England
- Education: King Henry VIII School, Coventry
- Alma mater: University of Manchester (BA, MA); King's College, Cambridge (PhD)
- Occupations: Academic, writer
- Political party: Communist Party of Great Britain (1966–1991)
- Website: MartinJacques.com

Martin Jacques (born 1945) is a British academic, journalist, political commentator and writer. He first came to prominence as the editor of Marxism Today, which under his leadership from 1977 to 1991 became an influential forum for political debate on the British left. He later co-founded the think tank Demos in 1993 and has written extensively as a columnist for major British newspapers including The Times, The Sunday Times, The Independent, The Observer, The Guardian, and the New Statesman. Jacques is also known internationally for his 2009 book When China Rules the World, in which he argues that China's rise will reshape the global order and end Western hegemony over international affairs.

== Early life and education ==
Jacques was born in October 1945 in the city of Coventry, then in Warwickshire, now in the West Midlands, the son of Dennis Jacques and Dorothy Preston, a mathematics undergraduate at Royal Holloway College, University of London in the late 1930s. Both parents worked in an aircraft factory during the war and during this period joined the Communist Party of Great Britain. They subsequently both became school teachers. He was brought up in Coventry.

Jacques was educated at King Henry VIII School, a direct grant grammar school in Coventry, followed by the University of Manchester, where he graduated with a first-class Honours degree in economics in 1967 and stayed on to take an MA (Econ) in 1968. He then went on to King's College, Cambridge, where he studied for a PhD on 'The emergence of "responsible" trade unionism, a study of the "new direction" in TUC policy, 1926–1935', accepted in 1977.

== Early career ==
Jacques joined the Communist Party of Great Britain at eighteen, and at both Manchester and Cambridge universities was very active in student politics. In 1966 he was one of the prime movers behind the Radical Student Alliance, a left-of-centre cross-party organisation of around 400 students from 108 universities and colleges which sought to build a students' movement 'able to take collective action on matters of general social concern'. At Cambridge he was instrumental in the formation of the Cambridge University Students' Union.

By 1967 he was a member of the Communist Party's executive committee, "probably the youngest member ever at about twenty-two", and he remained a member until 1991. Profoundly affected by the Soviet invasion of Czechoslovakia and the May events in Paris in 1968, which he described as his 'political birth', he was one of the early leaders of the Eurocommunist or reformist wing of the party, particularly influenced by the work of Antonio Gramsci.

Between 1969 and 1971 Jacques tutored undergraduates in economic history and economics at King's College, Cambridge. From 1971 to 1977 he was a lecturer in social and economic history at the University of Bristol.

In 1976, in a report to the executive committee of the Communist Party, he argued that 'class struggle is not confined to economic struggle ... but is also ideological and cultural'.

Later in 1976, he was chosen, with the traditionalist George Matthews, to finalise an updated version of The British Road to Socialism, the Communist Party's programme, to present to the Party's 35th National Congress in 1977. He later described the process as a 'Mexican stand-off', but the influence of Gramscian ideas was evident in the final draft, which called for a 'broad democratic alliance' and asserted that the progressive movement needed 'not only ... to be an association of class forces ... but of other important forces in society which emerge from areas of oppression not always directly connected with the relations of production'.

== Marxism Today ==
In 1977 Jacques was chosen to succeed James Klugmann as editor of Marxism Today, the theoretical magazine of the Communist Party, to which he had contributed for a number of years. He remained editor until its closure in 1991.

As editor of Marxism Today, Jacques presided over the golden age of the magazine, when its articles received national attention and helped to shape many debates on politics. In a long feature article in the Financial Times in November 1982, its chief political commentator Malcolm Rutherford reported that 'One of the most interesting developments in current British politics is taking place in the Communist Party or, more particularly, in the pages of Marxism Today .... The issue at stake is whether the British Left will continue to disintegrate or whether, partly through Marxism Today, it can re-establish itself on a new basis'.

The well-known right-wing columnist Peregrine Worsthorne commented in The Sunday Telegraph seven years later that Jacques had 'transformed Marxism Today into a publication which has appeal outside the narrow, coffin-like, confines of the party': he increased the readership from 3,500 to 15,600, at the same time as the membership of the Communist Party declined from 26,000 to 7,500. Neal Ascherson described the magazine as 'the most serious single focus for political discussion' in the late 1970s and 1980s, adding that 'Few read it, but a whole generation chewed over its ideas'. John Birt characterised it as 'open-minded and curious, and respectful of ideas, wherever they have been encountered'. For Ralf Dahrendorf it was 'one of the few forums of intellectual debate at a time at which there is a great silence in many other places'.

The transformation of Marxism Today under Jacques's leadership did not please everyone in the Communist Party, and in September 1982 Mick Costello, the party's industrial organiser, attacked Marxism Today in the pages of the party's daily newspaper, The Morning Star, after Marxism Today had carried an article by Tony Lane which was critical of some shop stewards. Kevin Halpin, another senior party figure, declared that 'The conclusion that I draw is that Martin Jacques is not a fit person to be the editor (of Marxism Today) and I shall so move'.

Jacques survived censure by the party's executive committee but many have seen this episode as triggering the process which led to the eventual split in the Communist Party between hardliners and reformists. The enmity lasted, and in 1987 Tony Chater, editor of the, by then struggling, Morning Star, dismissed Marxism Today as 'pure, revisionist, right-wing gimmickry', adding that 'Real Communists can't stomach Marxism Today'.

Two of Jacques's closest collaborators were Eric Hobsbawm and Stuart Hall. It was in Marxism Today that Hobsbawm published his article on 'The Forward March of Labour Halted' (Marxism Today, September 1978, pp. 279–286) and that Hall published his on 'The Great Moving Right Show' (Marxism Today, January 1979, pp. 14–20). Through these and other articles, including his own editorials, Jacques and Marxism Today were influential voices in critiquing the failures of the Labour Party and of postwar UK corporatist politics, and in understanding the rise of 'Thatcherism', a term which Marxism Today defined and helped to shape – though it did not coin the term – at a time when most analysts regarded Thatcher as no different from previous Conservative prime ministers.

In 1981, with Francis Mulhern, Jacques edited The Forward March of Labour Halted?, a collection of essays analysing the crisis on the left, and in 1983 Jacques extended the analysis in a book co-edited with Stuart Hall, The Politics of Thatcherism (1983). In the same year, Jacques conceived the idea of a 'People's March for Jobs', which took place in May–June 1981 (and was repeated in April–June 1983). At around this time Tony Benn noted in his diary that Jacques 'came to collect my corrected proofs .... He's one of the new young thoughtful communists, and he certainly has made a great success of Marxism Today – very imaginative.

Under Jacques's editorship, Marxism Today organised a series of influential events and conferences including three weekend-long conferences in London, 'The Great Moving Right Show' (October 1982), 'Left Alive' (November 1984), and 'Left Unlimited' (October 1986), attended by 1700, 2500, and nearly 4000 participants respectively.

Marxism Today became known for its innovative designs and marketing strategies, which included the introduction of advertisements, and even a line of branded goods such as mugs, t-shirts, and boxer shorts. In 1982 Malcolm Rutherford noted that 'you can buy it at W.H. Smith .... It is well-written, well-edited and brightly presented', and characterised by an 'attractive lay-out'. In 1987 the American journalist James M. Perry identified a new fashion trend in London: 'Call them "yummies" – young, upwardly mobile Marxists. Their favourite magazine is Marxism Today, slick and sharply written .... In the current issue, crammed with goodies for these yummies, readers are urged to send in their "hard-earned kopeks" to buy "the latest consumer indulgences" .... This month's special is a quilt cover "exclusively designed for Marxism Today by a leading fabric designer".' It was perhaps inevitable that Jacques himself should be described as 'the couturier of designer Marxism'.

In October 1988, through the pages of Marxism Today, Jacques launched the 'New Times' project, which sought to understand a post-Fordist and increasingly globalised world. This again resulted in a book co-edited with Stuart Hall, New Times: The Changing Face of Politics in the 1990s (1989).

Jacques moved the authorship as well as the readership of Marxism Today way beyond the shrinking confines of the Communist Party, and among those who wrote for the magazine were Gordon Brown, and Tony Blair, and it even featured interviews with Conservative Party politicians Chris Patten, Michael Heseltine and Edwina Currie. Regarding Blair, Jacques recalled, 'He rang me one day ... He said, "I'd like to write for Marxism Today – would that be possible?" I worked on what he wrote with him; it went through several drafts. What's the lightest boxing division? Featherweight, It was lighter than that'. The article was entitled 'Forging a New Agenda', and published in Marxism Today in October 1991.

Among the journalists who cut their teeth at the magazine were Bea Campbell and Suzanne Moore. Throughout Jacques's editorship, contributors were not paid for their articles, and Jacques himself, like other employees, only received the 'party wage'.

Jacques decided to close the magazine at the end of 1991, when it was still riding high. By then he had negotiated the financial independence of the magazine from the Communist Party, but declared that 'I have always hated institutions that don't know when to call it a day'.

In April 1997, Jacques and Stuart Hall analysed the Blair phenomenon, of which they were deeply critical, arguing that the 'fundamental point of departure [of New Labour] is that the last 18 years of Conservative government constitute the new natural law'. A subsequent article for the New Statesman further underlined the extent to which Blair had merely accepted rather than challenged the Thatcherite response to post-Fordism and globalisation.

In November 1998, Marxism Today returned for a one-off special issue edited by Jacques which extended this critique, with contributions by Eric Hobsbawm, Stuart Hall, Will Hutton, Richard Wilkinson, Suzie Orbach, Tom Nairn, Suzanne Moore, Anatole Kaletsky and others. Its cover featured a picture of Tony Blair, with the single headline, 'Wrong'. With sales of over 30,000, it proved to be the best-selling issue ever.

== Demos ==
While at Marxism Today Jacques increasingly saw the need for an independent cross-party think tank. In 1993, he, with the Marxism Today contributor Geoff Mulgan, later director of policy at 10 Downing Street under Tony Blair, and others co-founded Demos. This was 'founded as a self-conscious imitation of (and tribute to) the Institute of Economic Affairs', which had set much of the agenda for Thatcherism, but in this case to 'chart the course for a new kind of politics'. Jacques was the first chair of its advisory council (1993–97) and a trustee (1993–2000).

== Later journalism ==
From 1987 to 1994 Jacques was a columnist for The Sunday Times, and from 1990 to 1992 he also wrote a weekly column for The Times. In 1994 he joined The Independent as deputy editor, remaining until 1996. For the next two years he was a regular columnist for The Observer. Since then he has been a columnist for The Guardian and the New Statesman, and has continued to write for other papers as well.

Jacques scripted and presented the BBC Television programmes Italy on Trial (1993), The Incredible Shrinking Politician (1993), The End of the Western World (2 parts, 1996), and Proud to be Chinese (1998). He had written columns criticising Israel's behaviour during its 2006 war with Lebanon, likening it to that of "a settler colony whose people do not believe they are of the region but who none the less think they have every right to be there." He was further critical of how British politicians and media during the war had used the term "international community" to reflect Western stances at the exclusion of those from the Global South.

== When China Rules the World ==
Jacques became interested in East Asia after a 1993 holiday there. In 2009 Penguin Group published When China Rules the World claiming that "Martin Jacques offers provocative answers to some of the most pressing questions about China's growing place on the world stage."

In the book Jacques argued that far from China becoming like the West it would remain highly distinctive. He asserted that China's economic transformation and political system would continue long into the future and similarly its political system. He criticized Westerners who attempt to understand and evaluate China through a Western prism rather than on its own terms. So, for example, China could not be regarded as a conventional nation-state but was primarily a civilization-state. Westernisation, he suggested, had peaked, and China's rise will lead to a growing process of Sinicisation in the world and the end of a Western-dominated international order.

The book received mixed reviews. Perry Anderson described it as representing 'a belated meeting of Yesterday's Marxism with Asian Values'. Mary Dejevsky in The Independent said the book voices 'part of a debate the Western world should be having' but with prose 'not the most elegant' and 'repetitive'. David Pilling, thought it 'a useful corrective to those who assume that emerging superpowers, principal among them China, will recreate themselves in America's image'. Joseph Kahn praised the book's 'exhaustive, incisive exploration of possibilities that many people have barely begun to contemplate about a future dominated by China'. The journalist Andrew Moody described Jacques as 'the man of the moment in China' in 2017 after his book became more popular.

Chinese liberal intellectual Xiang Lanxin argued that the book laid the foundations for the advent of "Wolf Warrior diplomacy", the moniker given to an increasingly aggressive style of diplomacy from China in the 21st century, named after the "Wolf Warrior" patriotic action movie series. Xiang further remarked that Jacques "doesn't speak Chinese, and knows little about Chinese history and tradition", and that the theory of a civilization state is "utter fiction [that] does not stand up at all in scholarly terms."

== Personal life ==
Jacques met Harinder Kaur (Hari) Veriah, a Malaysian lawyer of Indian descent, while on holiday on the island of Tioman in Malaysia in 1993. He later credited her with teaching 'me to see the world from a non-Western perspective [and] ... see my country from an outsider's perspective'. They married in England in 1996 and had a son. In 1998 they moved to Hong Kong, where Harinder had a posting with her law firm, Lovells.

While celebrating the new millennium with Jacques and their friends Eric and Marlene Hobsbawm, Harinder had an epileptic seizure and was taken to Ruttonjee Hospital. She died there on 2 January 2000, aged 33, after suffering respiratory failure and cardiac arrest. Jacques sued the Hospital Authority for clinical negligence. While Harinder was in hospital she complained to Jacques: 'I am bottom of the pile here ... I am Indian and everyone else here is Chinese'. The hospital contested those comments, arguing the sole evidence was statements made by Jacques. Veriah's death and subsequent discussion of the affair in Hong Kong motivated the 2008 passage of Hong Kong's first specific anti-racism law. In 2010, the Hospital Authority settled with the family.

Jacques is chair and founder of the Harinder Veriah Trust, which supports girls from deprived backgrounds with their education at Assunta Primary School, and Assunta Secondary School in Petaling Jaya, Malaysia. It has also sponsored young Malaysian lawyers from under-privileged backgrounds to work for two-year stints at Hogan Lovells in London.

== Visiting fellowships and professorships ==
From 2003 to 2008, Jacques was a visiting research fellow at the Asia Research Centre of the London School of Economics. From 2008 to 2012, he was a visiting senior research fellow at IDEAS at the same institution. Since 2013 he has been a senior fellow at the Department of Politics and International Studies at the University of Cambridge.

Jacques has also held visiting fellowships or professorships at Aichi University, Nagoya (2005), Ritsumeikan University, Kyoto (2005), Renmin University, Beijing (2005–06), the National University of Singapore (2006 and 2015), the Transatlantic Academy, Washington DC (2010–11 and from 2013), Tsinghua University, Beijing (2011, 2015 and 2016–17) and Fudan University, Shanghai (2017).

== Selected works ==
Most of Jacques's writings have appeared in the form of magazine or newspaper articles, editorials in Marxism Today, and lectures.

- 'Consequences of the General Strike', in Jeffrey Skelley, ed, The General Strike, 1926 (London: Lawrence & Wishart, 1976), pp. 375–404
- with Francis Mulhern, The Forward March of Labour Halted? (London: NLB, 1981)
- with Stuart Hall, The Politics of Thatcherism (London: Lawrence & Wishart, 1983)
- with Stuart Hall, New Times: The Changing Face of Politics in the 1990s (London: Lawrence & Wishart, 1989)
- When China Rules the World: The End of the Western World and the Birth of a New Global Order (New York: Penguin Press, 2009)
- 'Implications of the Rise of China', in Andrew Gamble and David Lane, eds, The European Union and World Politics (London: Routledge, 2009), pp. 79–94
- 'The Eight Differences That Define China', in David Shambaugh, ed, The China Reader: Rising Power (sixth edition, Oxford: Oxford University Press, 2016), pp. 8–19

Media offices
Preceded by James Klugmann	Editor of Marxism Today; 1977–1991	Succeeded by Publication closed
Preceded by Matthew Symonds	Deputy Editor of The Independent; 1994–1996	Succeeded by Chris Blackhurst
