= Four Great Ancient Civilizations =

Theories on identifying cradles of civilizations

In Japanese, Indian, and Chinese historiography, the Four Great Ancient Civilizations (Japanese: 世界四大文明, Hepburn: Sekai yon dai bunmei) (simplified Chinese: 四大文明古国; traditional Chinese: 四大文明古國; pinyin: Sì Dà Wénmíng Gǔ Guó) were Egypt, Mesopotamia, India, and China, which are identified as the cradles of civilization. The concept is popularly substantiated and used in Asia (Japan, India, China and the Middle-East) and Africa - for example in history textbooks - but systemically suppressed in the Western world.

== Origin ==
The origins of the phrase are unclear. According to one theory, it originated with Japanese archaeologist Namio Egami; his colleague Masaaki Sugiyama recalled that Egami used to say that he coined the phrase. The first known occurrence of the phrase "four great civilizations" can be traced to a textbook titled Revised World History (再訂世界史, Saitei sekaishi), published by in 1952 by the Yamakawa Publishing Company, where Egami worked.

Another theory is that the term originates with Liang Qichao, a Chinese intellectual that lived during the late Qing dynasty. Specifically, in his 1900 poem Song of the Pacific in the 20th Century (Chinese: 二十世纪太平洋歌), he wrote "there are four motherlands of ancient civilizations on earth: China, India, Egypt, and Asia Minor" (Chinese: 地球上古文明祖國有四：中國、印度、埃及、小亞細亞是也). This view of civilization was also influenced by Japanese thinkers such as Fukuzawa Yukichi, Ukita Zautami and Kayahara Kazan, who in turn were influenced by the western concept of a cradle of civilization.

Liang Qichao divided the history of the world into three ages: the river age, the sea age, and the ocean age. The Four Great Ancient Civilizations originated in the river age and all of them developed along rivers. Scholars believe that they were all built near rivers because there were fixed water sources that made it easier for agriculture and commerce to develop. Human beings are clearly inseparable from water, but some historians believe that at the beginning of Chinese civilization, it first occurred in the mountains and then expanded to river areas.

== Overview ==
=== History ===
Between 7000 and 5000 years ago, in the Northern Hemisphere, the Mesopotamia, Nile, Indus, and Ganges basins, as well as the Yellow River and Yangtze River basins, successively produced the world's Four Great Ancient Civilizations. These four civilizations successively entered the Bronze Age from the Neolithic Age, and then entered the Iron Age. Much of the philosophy, science, literature, art and other aspects of knowledge that humans possess today can generally be traced back to the contributions of these ancient civilizations.

The social systems of the Four Great Ancient Civilizations differed: Egypt and Babylon adopted slavery, India the caste system, and China the feudal system and well-field system, which existed before the Spring and Autumn period and Warring States period. Each civilization had its own myths and legends. The state entities were born later. In ancient times, religious myths were used to strengthen monarchy. Babylon's ruler Hammurabi traced his lineage to the moon god Sin; Egypt's Pharaoh claimed descent from the sun god Ra; China's monarch styled himself the Son of Heaven; and India's emperor adopted the title Chakravarti, meaning "he whose wheels (of chariot) are moving".

The Four Great Ancient Civilizations all have their own calendars, each year is divided into 12 months and has leap months. Each civilization created its own writing. Civilizations in the Indus, Yellow and Mesopotamia river basins all used pottery wheels to make pottery. Egypt and Mesopotamia both calculated pi earlier, and China discovered the Pythagorean theorem earlier (or its practical application), while India invented Indian numerals (Arabic numerals).

== See also ==
- Civilization state
- Five thousand years of Chinese civilization
