= Five thousand years of Chinese civilization =

Assertion made about Chinese history

- Traditional Chinese: 中華文明五千年
- Simplified Chinese: 中华文明五千年
Transcriptions
Standard Mandarin
- Hanyu Pinyin: Zhōnghuá wénmíng wǔqiān nián
Yue: Cantonese
- Jyutping: Zung1waa4 man4ming4 ng5cin1 nin4

Five thousand years of Chinese civilization (or 5000 years of Chinese history) is a Chinese historiographical expression widely circulated since the late Qing dynasty claiming that China has five thousand years of history or civilization. First disseminated by European missionaries in the 17th century, the expression is commonly found especially in the Chinese-speaking world by the early 20th century to show that China has a long-lasting history, although it is sometimes used by the governments and media as an instrument of Chinese nationalism and soft power. Even though there is not sufficient archaeological evidence for China's ancient history, the belief that the history of China is at least 5,000 years old, and that China is one of the Four Great Ancient Civilizations, is deeply ingrained in popular culture.

== Basis ==
The Xia dynasty was the first hereditary dynasty of China to rule the Central Plains as recorded in traditional Chinese history books. According to the conclusion of the Xia–Shang–Zhou Chronology Project commissioned by China, the Xia dynasty began around 2070 BC, which predates modernity for approximately four thousand years. However, most ancient Chinese documents placed the beginning of Chinese history in the prehistorical era of the Five Emperors, and the Yellow Emperor, as the first of the five emperors, was nearly a thousand years before the Xia dynasty. According to the Records of Emperors and Kings written by Huangfu Mi of the Jin dynasty, it is believed that there were five emperors before Emperor Yao, which lasted 341 years in total, and the first year of the Yellow Emperor should be 2698 BC. According to this calculation, Chinese civilization has a history of nearly 5,000 years since the time of the Yellow Emperor. In addition, some scholars believe that before the Yellow Emperor, there was another era of a tribal leader named Yan Emperor, which became the beginning of Chinese civilization in the Chinese public consciousness (see Yan Huang Zisun). In this way, whether it began with the Yellow Emperor or the Yan Emperor before it, "five thousand years of Chinese civilization" gradually became a conventional narrative among Chinese people, implying that the Chinese civilization can be traced as an unbroken thread five thousands of years into the past.

== Origin and usage ==
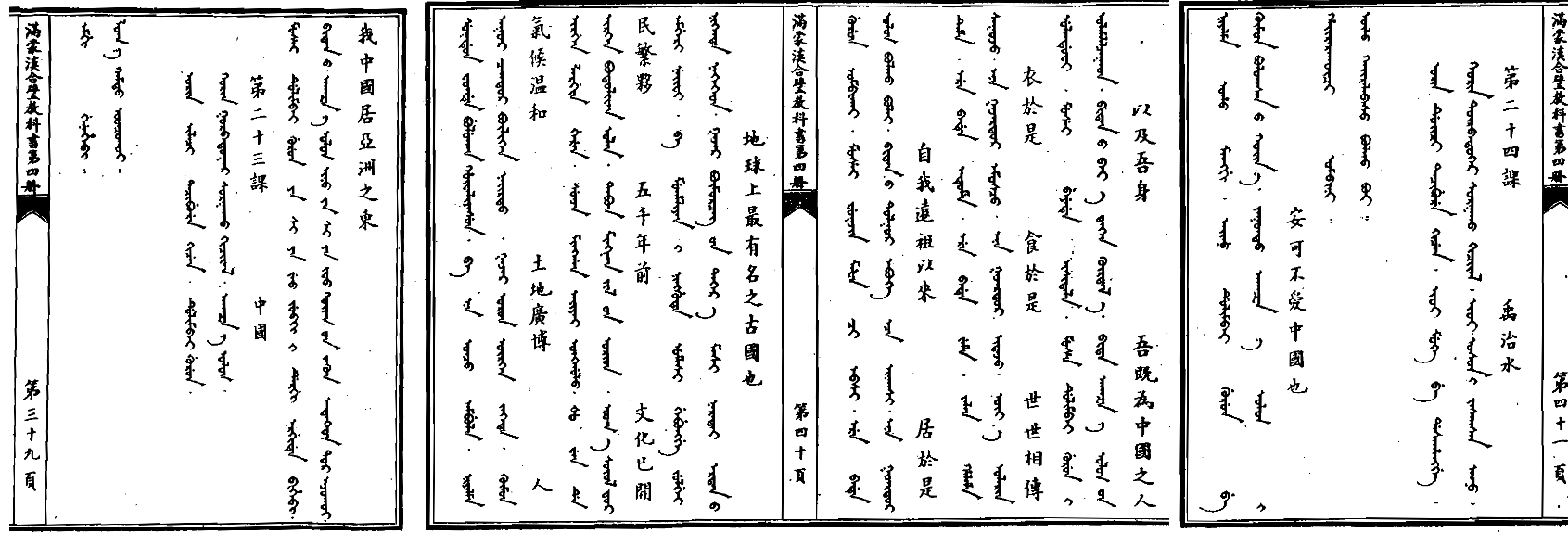
The "China" section of the Manchu–Mongolian–Chinese Interlinear Trilingual Textbook published in the late Qing dynasty

According to research, the first people to put forward the idea of a 5,000-year history of Chinese civilization were Jesuit missionaries in the early Qing dynasty. Around 1650s, during the reign of the Shunzhi Emperor of the Qing dynasty, Italian missionary Martino Martini was the first person to systematically introduce Chinese geography, culture, history and language to Europe. In his book Sinicæ Historiæ Decas Prima, he covered a wide range of Chinese subjects and was the first person to put forward the concept of five thousand years of Chinese history.

By the late Qing dynasty, the concept of "5,000 years of Chinese culture" had been officially recognized and promoted by the Qing government. For example, the Chinese history textbook "Chinese History of the Present Dynasty" as approved by the Board of Education of the late Qing dynasty began with the statement "China was founded 5,000 years ago and has the longest history in the world. And its culture is the best among all the Eastern countries since ancient times...". Similarly, the "China" section of the trilingual textbook Manchu–Mongolian–Chinese Interlinear Trilingual Textbook published in 1909 during the late Qing dynasty also stated in three languages that "Our country China is located in the east of Asia, with mild climate, vast land and numerous people. Its culture was developed five thousand years ago, and it is the most famous ancient country on the earth...".

When Sun Yat-sen took office as the provisional President of the Republic of China in early 1912, following the 1911 Revolution, he sent delegated powers to all provinces, "taking the year 4609 of the Yellow Emperor as the first year of the Republic of China", which was the first time in Chinese history that the "five thousand year history" theory was publicly acknowledged by a head of state of China. During this period, there was also a fever for worship of the Yellow Emperor in China.

Since then, the concept of "five thousand years of Chinese civilization" has become more popular. Similar expressions such as "5000 years of Chinese history" have also emerged and become popular in China, including the People's Republic of China period. For example, the popular history books on Chinese history compiled by mainland Chinese writers Lin Handa and Cao Yuzhang were published under the title of "Five Thousand Years Up and Down".

In his political discourse, general secretary of the Chinese Communist Party Xi Jinping often uses the expression. Xi frequently cites ancient historical examples in his political discourses, encouraging the Chinese people to develop "historical self-confidence" based on their "splendid civilization".

== Criticism ==
Although "five thousand years of Chinese civilization" has become a common expression or narrative both inside and outside China, the concept is not universally accepted by scholars, especially in the Western academic world. Although there are many records about the Xia dynasty in traditional Chinese literature such as the Book of Documents, as they were not written contemporaneously and no recognized primary evidence of the existence of the Xia dynasty has yet been found, the historicity of the Xia dynasty remains unconfirmed. If counting from the beginning of the following Shang dynasty, China has approximately 3,700 years of recorded history. Even if the Xia dynasty were to be included, the maximum extent would only be four thousand years, and any inclusion of prehistory into literarily recorded history would be an exaggeration.

Other archaeologists and scholars argue that instead of recorded history, the roots of Chinese civilization trace back to the various neolithic cultures of the Yellow and Yangtze River valleys. Many of these cultures, such as the Longshan and Liangzhu and Erlitou, are cited as examples of complex proto-states. Other scholars argue further that many of these ancient cultures were integrated into an embryonic "early cultural circle", therefore pushing the date back to 8,000 years. However, linking these cultures to the concept of a "Chinese civilization" remains contentious, as the concept of "civilization" might be anachronistic to this era.

== See also ==
- Chinese historiography
- Civilization state
- Cradle of civilization
- History of China
- Sinocentrism

== Sources ==
- Liu, Q.; He, J. (2023). A History of Un-fractured Chinese Civilization in Archaeological Interpretation. Springer Nature Singapore. ISBN 978-981-19-3946-4.
