= Ku6 Media =

Online video company based in China

Ku6 Media Co., Ltd.
- Company type: Public
- Traded as: Nasdaq: KUTV
- Industry: Services in Entertainment - Diversified
- Founded: 2006; 20 years ago
- Headquarters: Beijing, China
- Key people: Fang Du (CEO and director); Frank Feng (CFO); Jian Lu (CTO); (Dec 31, 2013)
- Products: Video Entertainment
- Revenue: ▼US$ 2.35 million
- Operating income: ▲ -US$ 0.83 million
- Net income: ▲ -US$ 0.83 million
- Total assets: ▲US$ 8.63 million
- Total equity: ▼ -US$ 4.9 million
- Number of employees: 211 (Dec 31, 2013)
- Website: ku6.com

Ku6 Media Co. Ltd. an online video company, was established in 2006 and now is based in Beijing, China. Those videos posted on Ku6 website include news, movies, television dramas, music videos, entertainment sports and user-generated content (UGC). Ku6 Media was founded as Hurray! Holding Co., Ltd. and changed its name to Ku6 Media Co., Ltd. in August 2010.

== History ==
In 2006, Ku6 Media was established and began to engage in online video markets. In 2007, Ku6 Media reached a business cooperation agreement with Baidu and obtained the first round financing capital ($10 million) from Draper Fisher Jurvetson (DFJ) and DT Capital Partners. In 2008, Ku6 Media received the license issued by SARFT. In 2009, Ku6 Media joined Shanda Group and merged with Hurray to be listed. In 2010, "Ku6 Media Theater" went online, representing the birth of China's hulu mode.

== Products and services ==
Most of the videos posted on the Ku6 website are short-form videos submitted via user uploads. The company provides some customized services, such as user-navigating channels for video sharing and commenting tools; search history for frequent visitors; chatting box alongside videos. In addition to the website, the company also provides videos on mobile platforms. On December 31, 2012, the company delivered an average of over 50,000 new UGC video clips each day.

== Operations ==
Ku6 Media enjoys partnerships with NetEase, Kaixin, CCTV Channel V, YouTube and many film and TV producers in China, like Huayi and Hairun.

In April 2011, Ku6 Media announced the merger with Hangzhou Soushi Networking Co., Ltd. ("Pipi") in an all-stock transaction under which all of the equity interests in Pipi were sold to Ku6 in exchange for an aggregate of 2,212,114,257 ordinary shares of Ku6.
In September 2010, Ku6 Media reached content cooperation agreements with Sony Pictures Television and another major Hollywood studio for some of its licensed content.

In 2013, the company announced its love-theme UGC video campaign, which was expected to generate a good number of quality and creative UGC videos around the theme "love", though it did not succeed.
