= Xiang Lanxin =

Chinese liberal intellectual and professor

Xiang Lanxin (born 1956, Chinese: 相蓝欣; pinyin: Xiāng Lánxīn) (Note: In this Chinese name, the family name is Xiang.) is a Chinese scholar of international relations and the history of modern China. He is an expert on relations among China, USA and Europe, an emeritus professor of history and international relations at the Geneva Graduate Institute and director of the Center for One Belt, One Road Studies in Shanghai.

== Early life and career ==
Xiang was born in Nanjing, Jiangsu in 1956. He attended college at Fudan University in Shanghai before moving to the United States to earn an MA and PhD from the Johns Hopkins School of Advanced International Studies in 1990. He served as a professor of International History and Politics Geneva Graduate Institute in Switzerland from 1996 to 2021. Xiang has spent the majority of his career working outside of China, though he still maintains Chinese citizenship. He translated “Keynes: A Biography”, however if he admires Keynes is not known.

== Views ==
Xiang falls within the liberal spectrum of Chinese political thinkers. He considers himself patriotic, but is also critical of the ruling Chinese Communist Party (CCP) and believes the country should embrace democracy. In his book The Quest for Legitimacy in Chinese Politics, a New Interpretation he compared CCP leadership to the tsars of Russia leading up to the October Revolution, "with charlatans and sycophants running amuckamok." Xiang is also highly critical of Montesquieu and his view of democracy, which he sees as racialist and ignorant of China's historical structures of power and governance. Xiang instead advocates a view of democracy informed by Confucianism and direct democracy.

Xiang argues that China had a relatively stable system of governance pilloried by many European thinkers—such as Montesquieu, Marx, Hegel, and Adam Smith—who understood Asia only as a negative example, unworthy of study in its own right.

Xiang is critical of "Wolf Warrior diplomacy", the moniker given to more aggressive and confrontational diplomatic behavior by the People's Republic of China in the 21st century, which he considers unproductive and the result of influence of Martin Jacques' book When China Rules the World.

In a 2020 interview with the blog publication Reading the China Dream, Xiang mocked the association of colleague Zhang Weiwei with the unaccredited and discredited Geneva School of Diplomacy and International Relations, in Switzerland.
