= Civilization state =

Country that is a unique civilization in its own right

A civilization state, or civilizational state, is a country that aims to represent not just a historical territory, ethnolinguistic group, or body of governance, but a unique civilization in its own right. It is distinguished from the concept of a nation state by describing a country's dominant sociopolitical modes as constituting a category larger than a single nation. When classifying states as civilization states, emphasis is often placed on a country's historical continuity and cultural unity across a large geographic region.

While coined in the context of China, the term has also been used to describe countries such as India, Russia, Iran, Egypt and Turkey. The category of the civilization state has also been criticized as setting up a false binary in service of political ulterior motives of both the proponents and the opponents of these states, and for emphasizing an oppositional relationship with the category of nation states as opposed to recognizing a combination of nation-state and civilization-state characteristics in contemporary states.

== China ==
The term "civilization-state" was first used by American political scientist Lucian Pye in 1990 to categorize China as having a distinct sociopolitical character, as opposed to viewing it as a nation state in the European model. The use of this new term implies that China was and still is an "empire state" with a unique political tradition and governmental structure, and its proponents asserted that the nation state model fails to properly describe the evolution of the Chinese state. Proponents of the label describe China as having a unique historical and cultural unity, derived from a continuous process of cultural syncretism. The term was further popularized by its use in When China Rules the World by British political scientist Martin Jacques.

According to Li Xing and Timothy M. Shaw, the central feature of analyzing China as a civilization state is the view that the Chinese state derives its legitimacy from the continuation of a sociopolitical order which posits that the state maintains natural authority over its subjects, and that it is the "guardian" of both its citizens and their society, a view of the state that is completely distinct from the Westphalian nation-state model. Other scholars make the case that the key features of a civilization-state are the maintenance of an ethos of cultural unity despite displaying significant cultural diversity, across centuries of history and a large geographic space. Some specifically draw attention to the longevity of the Chinese writing system, or describe China's existence as being uniquely and inexorably tied to the past.

Guang Xia pushes back on the idea of the uniqueness of a Chinese civilization-state. Xia argues that civilization-state discourse in China studies is an important and positive development, as it allows for characteristics of the modern Chinese state to be properly analyzed in the context of their history. However, Xia concludes that ultimately, all civilizations must reinvent themselves in the context of their history, and that it is a mistake to view China as a static entity or to portray it as being more tied to its past than the rest of the world.

== India ==
The conceptualization of India as a "civilization state"—a sovereign political entity whose legitimacy and identity derive from millennia of continuous cultural, philosophical, and spiritual traditions rather than the post-Westphalian template of a homogenous nation-state—occupies a vital position in modern political theory and international relations. Unlike Western nation-states that historically forged cohesion through standardized language, ethnic identity, or centralized legal mandates, India’s civilizational framework operates on what historian Ravinder Kumar identified as a multi-layered, polycentric ethos capable of absorbing vast internal diversity without fracturing its core identity. This spatial continuity is rooted in what religion scholar Diana L. Eck terms a "sacred geography," mapped through subcontinental pilgrimage networks (tirthayatra) in ancient texts like the Vishnu Purana and Rigveda. This spatial awareness was mirrored politically in Kautilya’s Arthashastra through the concept of the Chakravartikshetra—a recognized geopolitical and cultural realm spanning the subcontinent long before modern state formation. Historian Radhakumud Mookerji similarly argued in Fundamental Unity of India (1914) that an organic, decentralized cultural matrix long preceded administrative centralization, while historian C. A. Bayly highlighted how pre-colonial networks of information and religious pilgrimage fostered a distinct sense of subcontinental belonging.

In the post-colonial era, theorists such as Partha Chatterjee and Ashis Nandy argued that this civilizational model inherently resists Western political science's homogenizing impulses, favoring overlapping identities and local autonomy over rigid state control. This perspective was echoed in Jawaharlal Nehru’s thesis in The Discovery of India regarding an "invisible thread" of cultural unity, as well as Rajeev Bhargava’s framing of Indian secularism as a civilizational mechanism of "principled distance." However, this civilizational narrative has faced critical pushback from constitutional scholars and social reformers. B. R. Ambedkar strongly cautioned against romanticizing civilizational antiquity, arguing that uncritical idealizations of traditional Indian civilization risk sanctifying embedded social hierarchies and caste inequities. Modern political thinkers like Sunil Khilnani (The Idea of India) further contend that modern India's true strength lies not in an essentialist civilizational past, but in its post-1950 constitutional democracy, which consciously redefined Indian unity around civic norms rather than inherited cultural dogmas.

This historical tension directly shapes contemporary political debates. As scholar Jayati Srivastava observes, the current civilizational narrative is deeply contested between two distinct paradigms: an inclusive, pluralistic view that positions Indian civilization as a unifying bridge across the broader subcontinent, and an exclusivist, Hindutva-centered model anchored in religious identity. Srivastava highlights how proponents of this latter model have gained prominence alongside the political rise of the Bharatiya Janata Party (BJP), deploying civilizational rhetoric to celebrate ancient cultural glories and assert global prominence while simultaneously marginalizing internal minorities. Today, this internal ideological conflict directly impacts foreign policy and global positioning. Strategic thinkers and diplomats like S. Jaishankar (The India Way) leverage civilizational motifs—such as Vasudhaiva Kutumbakam (the world is one family) and Panchsheel—to anchor India's 21st-century strategic autonomy and claim a multipolar leadership role.

== Other proposed civilization states ==
=== Egypt ===
Mohamed Soliman has argued that by celebrating its pharaonic tradition, Egypt under Abdel Fattah el-Sisi has pivoted to a civilization-state identity, in opposition to the Western Westphalian system of nation states.

=== Iran ===
Iran has been described, and has been observed to increasingly describe itself, as a civilization state. In addition to considering itself one of the oldest civilizations in the world, Iran's government has emphasized a civilizational view of itself as it seeks to highlight a path to modernization that is distinct from the nation-state model, and particularly as it aligns with China diplomatically.

=== Russia ===
Vladimir Putin's administration has at times embraced the rhetoric of portraying Russia as a distinct Eurasian civilization-state.

=== Turkey ===
Turkish political leaders in the 21st century, particularly those affiliated with the AKP and other nationalist parties, have promoted a conception of Turkey as a civilization-state, drawing on neo-Ottomanist discourse, as well as an emphasis on Islamic identity and an asserted rejection of Western models of governance.

== Criticism ==
Amitav Acharya argues that "the civilization state concept sets up a false binary between the East and the West" focusing on the purportedly anti-liberal values of a small set of non-Western countries to the exclusion of traditional values in these same countries that would undermine this characterization, and calls the concept an "analytical straitjacket". V. V. Naumkin agrees that proponents of the discourse of civilization states tend to use it as a simplistic "weapon of ideological and political struggles", but asserts that it also provides a lens for more thoughtful analysis of differences between states, noting that China, India and Russia have significant differences among themselves and incorporate aspects of both transhistorical civilizations and modern nation states. Jayati Srivatsa similarly notes that in its pursuit of internal homogeneity on the basis of Hindu identity, proponents of India as a civilization state ironically end up reinforcing its character as a nation-state representing a homogenous national group.

== See also ==
- Chinese exceptionalism
- Cradle of civilization
- Empire
- Four Great Ancient Civilizations
- Five thousand years of Chinese civilization
- Imperialism
- Superstate
- Tributary system of China
