= Factual basis =

Concept in United States criminal law

In United States criminal law, a factual basis is a statement of the facts detailing an individual crime and its particulars, stipulated to by the prosecution and the defense, which forms a basis by which a judge can accept a guilty plea from the defendant.

== United States ==
In its criminal justice section, the American Bar Association has adopted the following standard regarding the need for a factual basis:

Standard 14-1.6. Determining factual basis of plea

(a) In accepting a plea of guilty or nolo contendere, the court should make such inquiry as may be necessary to satisfy itself that there is a factual basis for the plea. As part of its inquiry, the defendant may be asked to state on the record whether he or she agrees with, or in the case of a nolo contendere plea, does not contest, the factual basis as proffered.

(b) Whenever a defendant pleads nolo contendere or pleads guilty and simultaneously denies culpability, the court should take special care to make certain that there is a factual basis for the plea. The offer of a defendant to plead guilty should not be refused solely because the defendant refuses to admit culpability. Such a plea may be refused where the court has specific reasons for doing so which are made a matter of record.

In the 2008 book Criminal Procedure, author John M. Scheb pointed out that in the United States, a majority of the states have initiated measures to make sure that the plea is entered into of the defendant's own accord, and that it is grounded in a factual basis. Scheb wrote, "Most states have adopted similar rules of procedure to ensure that pleas are voluntary and comply with constitutional requirements." He explained that judges have some discretion in determining the voluntary nature of the plea given by the defendant, "Rules concerning voluntariness and factual basis generally do not specify any precise method to be followed by the court. Judges employ various methods to determine voluntariness. Often these methods include interrogation of the defendant by the judge and sometimes by the prosecutor and defense counsel." Scheb noted that, "The objective is to establish that no improper inducements have been made to secure a plea, that the defendant understands the basic constitutional rights incident to a trial, that these rights are being waived, and that he or she comprehends the consequences of the plea." Scheb discussed the manner in which the court determines the factual basis for the plea, "In determining that a factual basis exists for the defendant's plea, judges often have the prosecutor briefly outline available proof to establish a prima facie case of the defendant's guilt. A more extensive inquiry is usually necessary for specific-intent crimes." Scheb emphasized the importance why it is necessary to establish a factual basis for the plea, before it is entered by the defendant: "The thoroughness of the court's determination of voluntariness and factual basis becomes important if a defendant later moves to withdraw a plea and enter a plea of not guilty."

== See also ==
- Alford plea
