= Li Xing (academic) =

Chinese-born Danish professor of development and international relations

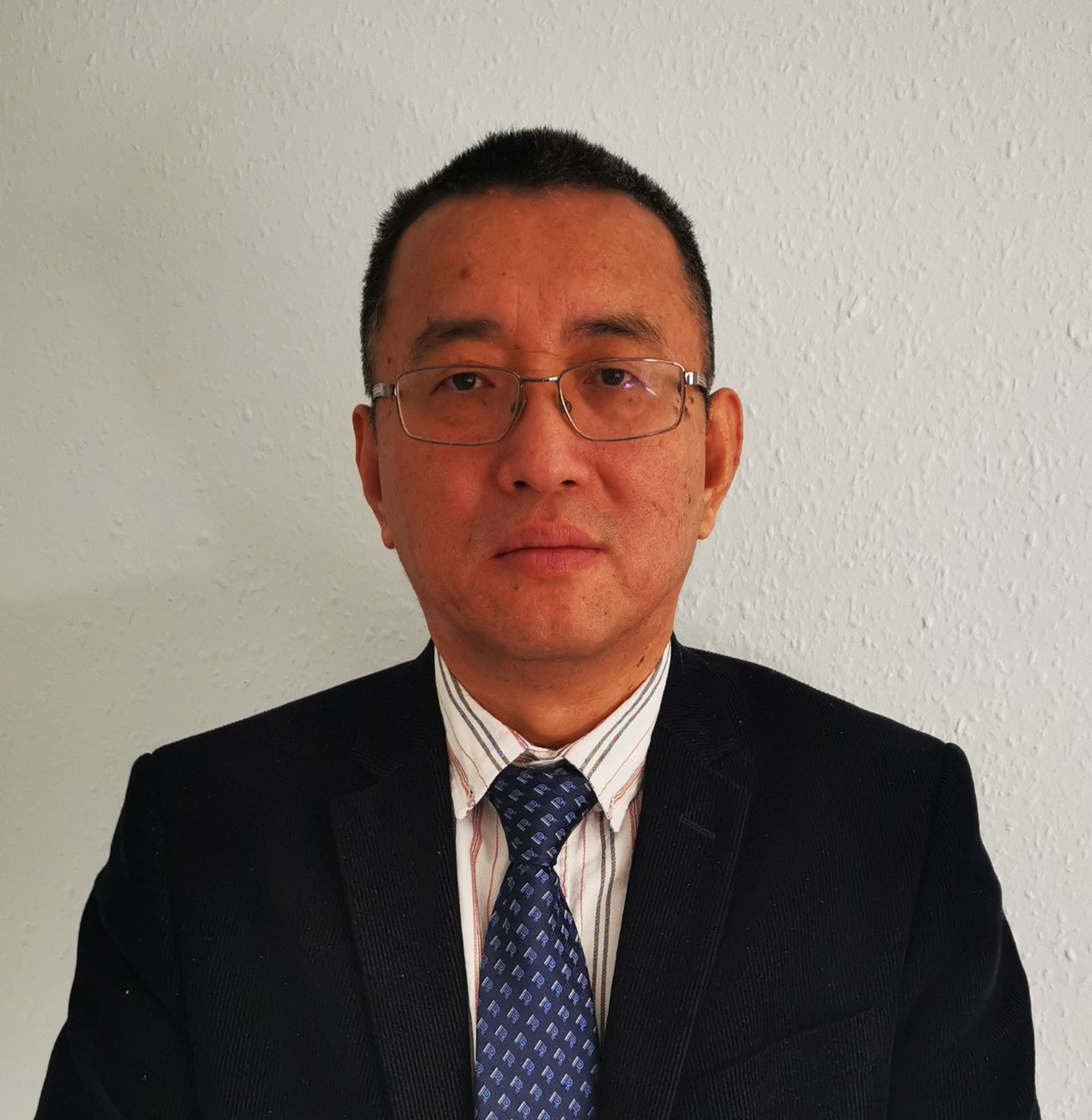
- Born: 19 October 1962 (age 63); Hangzhou, China
- Occupation: Professor

Li Xing (born 19 October 1962) is a Chinese professor of development and international relations at Aalborg University in Denmark.

== Education ==
Li Xing holds a bachelor's degree in English from Guangzhou Institute of Foreign Languages and a master's degree in English from Aalborg University. In 1998, he received a Ph.D. in development studies and international relations at Aalborg University as well.

== Careers, Affiliations and Honors ==
In 2003 Li Xing was employed by Aalborg University as an assistant professor. In 2006 he became associate professor and in 2012 he became professor. Starting in 2007 he made it possible to set up a study program in Chinese area studies at Aalborg University assisted by other colleagues. In 2012 he initiated and founded the double master's degree in China and International Relations at Aalborg University in cooperation with University of International Relations in Beijing. He was manager of this joint master's program until 2015. Besides he has had several administrative functions as chairman of the Board of Studies for International Affairs and member of the Department Council of Culture and Global Studies and member of the Academic Council of Social Science Faculty. Currently he is director at Research Center on Development and International Relations (DIR) at Aalborg University. Since 2012 he has also been Editor in Chief for Journal of China and International Relations. In 2019 he was awarded "Teacher of the Year" by the Study Board of International Affairs. In addition, he has been very often invited to play in different media settings.

Finally, Li Xing is Honorary/Distinguished Professor appointed by a number of Chinese universities, such as University of International Relations, Beijing Normal University, Guangdong Institute for International Strategies, Zhongnan University of Finance and Law, Huaqiao University, Guangxi University and Jiaxing University. He is often invited to visit and lecture in China and around the world.
