= Vivibear =

Chinese-Swedish writer

Zhang Weiwei
- Born: 26 November 1977 (age 48); Ningbo, Zhejiang, China
- Citizenship: Sweden
- Occupations: Housewife, internet writer, blogger
- Writing career
- Pen name: vivibear
- Period: 2006–present
- Genre: Romance

Zhang Weiwei (Chinese: 张薇薇) is a Chinese-Swedish author who writes under the pseudonym vivibear. Her stories include romance novels and time-traveling series for young adults, all published in Chinese. To date, all sixteen novels she wrote were believed to be found with various degrees of plagiarism, and the discovery was widely reported by Chinese media.

Accusations that vivibear had plagiarised were first made in January 2009, and prior to this time, nine books have gone into print and are prominently placed on bestselling lists at all major Chinese online book retailers. More than a million copies have been sold in less than four years.

== Personal life ==
Zhang Weiwei was born on 26 November 1977, in Ningbo, Zhejiang. She attended Zhejiang University of Media and Communications (ZUMC) as an undergraduate. After leaving college, Zhang worked at the official TV station in the city of Ningbo. Not long after she left her job to marry a Swedish man in 2004. The couple now reside in Sweden.

== Career ==
Zhang Weiwei first wrote, and posted, on the internet The Search for Past Life (Chinese: 寻找前世之旅), a series of stories about a young girl who routinely travels back in time to solve mysteries. This began several book contracts.

She was the winner of several competitions for original stories in internet publishing. In the list of "Top 20 List of Successful Chinese Internet Writers" compiled in 2008, vivibear ranked No. 1.

== Plagiarism controversy ==
On 30 January 2009, a netizen on the forum "Tianya.cn" accused Zhang Weiwei of copying and plagiarizing. While reading one of vivibear's novels, this person noticed random switches between traditional Chinese and simplified Chinese, which is very unusual given that the writing system in mainland China has long ago been converted to simplified Chinese. More sections in vivibear's books were found to be identical to other people's works, all published at much earlier dates.

The post "Successful Young Adult Author vivibear is a Plagiarizing Maniac" received thousands of hits within the first hours of its appearance. Among the plagiarized works are fan fictions and yaoi stories that amateur writers published online, and well-known authors including Ryōtarō Shiba and Christian Jacq. The number of writers on the Plagiarized List has been reported to exceed 500. The number of works vivibear plagiarized was more than 600.

Due to its severity, mainstream media, including newspapers , TV programs and news websites soon picked up the story and unanimously condemned what has become one of the largest instance of plagiarism by a single person. The Local, a Swedish news website reported Chinese media allegations of her plagiarism on 26 April 2009.

Throughout this time, Zhang Weiwei has remained silent in regards to the plagiarism scandal. Since then, she has made deletions and corrections to her online blog where she publishes her latest book series, removing contents that were suspected of plagiarism.

In February and March, publishers and literature hosting websites having contracts with vivibear responded:

1. jjwxc.net：Affirmed plagiarism. Clean up impossible: portion of plagiarized text too large . Delete vivibear's account.
2. myfreshnet：Accusations of plagiarism are confirmed; The accused would not give any apology or explanation. Zhang's ID and personal column have been deleted
3. Princess Monthly：Issues of Zhang's latest novels Fantasy Knight and 101st Time Runaway Bride have been delayed due to unspecified reasons
4. Core Publishing Group: All unsold books by vivibear have been pulled off-shelf. From now on, we will not published any more of her novels. Please stop all related discussions
5. Yueduji: The CEO has learnt of the situation; the company reserves the right to sue vivibear should proper authorities judge it to be plagiarism

Queries to the Chinese Copyright Office have met no reply. Due to difficulty of international lawsuit, no legal actions have been taken against vivibear yet. On 1 June 2009, Ji Yi Fang (Chinese: 记忆坊), the brother company of Princess Monthly, together with Hua Wen Publisher (Chinese: 华文出版社), released Zhang Weiwei's Fantansy Knight, which had previously been exposed for plagiarism. Marketing campaigns for the new book present news reports of Zhang Weiwei's plagiarism in various media outlets as a sign of the author's popularity.

Ji Yi Fang severed ties with Zhang Weiwei soon after Fantansy Knight was published. Vivibear then signed on with newly opened publishing company Ju Shi Wen Hua (Chinese: 聚石文化), a subsidiary of Shanda. Doubts about vivibear's integrity caused readers to file complaints with both Ju Shi Wen Hua and Shanda to no avail. As of present, Ju Shi Wen Hua has helped Vivibear to publish three books, Flora, Bloodline Bride, and a Mediterranean travel book called Across the Blue. Flora is accused of stealing plots from Japanese detective manga series Case Closed. Bloodline Bride had been accused of extensive plagiarism in 2009. Netizens who examined the official preview excerpts and teasers of vivibear's travel memoir found a fourth of the book's contents are identical to older travel accounts, magazine articles, and blogs who are written by other people and published prior to vivibear's work.

Vivibear continues writing in her on-line blog as usual.

== Achievements and honors ==
Before 2009, vivibear placed prominently in the "Top 20 List of Successful Chinese Internet Writers" and was admittedly one of the top-selling novelists on the Chinese romance fiction scene.

Since 2009, vivibear continue to garner more honors. Numerous Chinese newspapers granted her the title "Goddess of Plagiarism." In addition, on 2 November 2009, vivibear was given the Golden Crow GJM Award (Chinese: 金乌鸦郭敬明奖) for her achievement and efforts in plagiarism. The Golden Crow Award (Chinese: 金乌鸦) has been compared to the Golden Raspberry Award. It is a grassroot virtual online competition that encourages Chinese internet users to nominate and vote their favorite celebrities for a variety of categories. Vivibear received 12150 votes, the highest number of votes in the history of Golden Crow.

== List of works ==
All books have been accused of plagiarism.

Published

1. The Search for Past Life (Chinese: 寻找前世之旅)
2. Sequel to The Search for Past Life (Chinese: 寻找前世之旅续集)
3. The Search for Past Life 3 (Chinese: 寻找前世之流年转)
4. Girl Who Time Traveled Back to Kyoto (Chinese: 平安京之宋姬物语)
5. Love Story in the Warring Kingdoms (Chinese: 恨相逢之战国之恋)
6. Search for the Dragon (Chinese: 寻龙记)
7. Tang Princess Looking for a Husband (Chinese: 大唐公主招亲记)
8. Lan Ling (Chinese: 兰陵缭乱,123部)
9. Legend of the Onmyōji (Chinese: 阴阳师物语)
10. Fantasy Knight (Chinese: 骑士幻想夜（I、II、III）)
11. Flora (Chinese: 花神)
12. Bloodline Bride (Chinese: 血族新娘)

To Be Published

1. 101st Time Runaway Bride (Chinese: 第101次逃婚)
