= Chen Danian =

Chinese entrepreneur (born 1978)

Chen Danian 陈大年
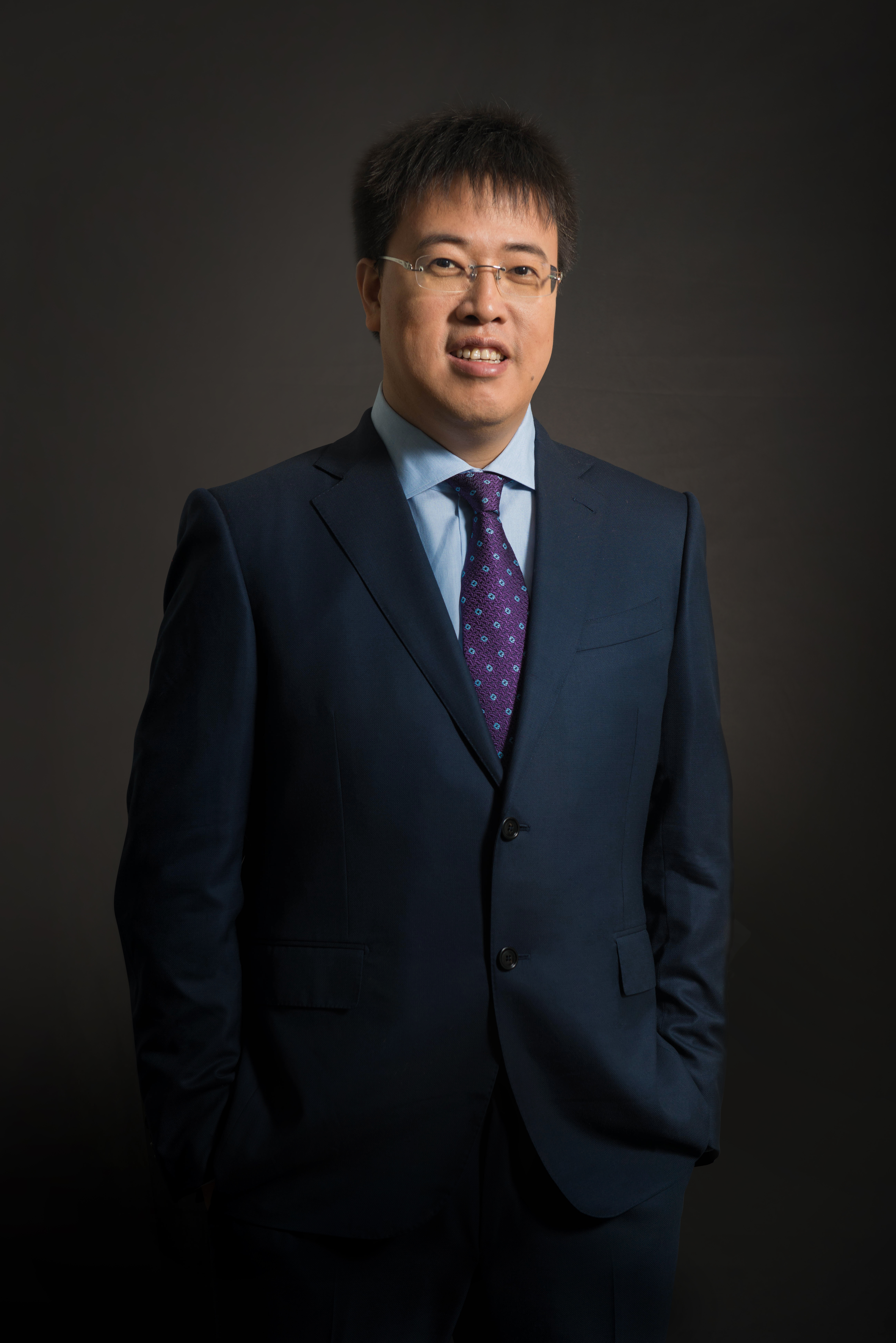
- Chen pictured in 2016
- Born: 1978 (age 47–48)
- Education: Fudan University
- Occupations: Programmer, Internet Entrepreneur
- Known for: LinkSure, WiFi Master Key, Shanda

Chen Danian
- Traditional Chinese: 陳大年
- Simplified Chinese: 陈大年
Transcriptions
Standard Mandarin
- Hanyu Pinyin: Chén Dànián

Chen Danian (Chinese: 陈大年; pinyin: Chén Dànián, born 1978), also known as Danny Chen, is an Internet entrepreneur. He is the founder and CEO of LinkSure. The company launched the world's largest and first-of-its-kind WiFi sharing app, WiFi Master Key.

He is the co-founder and was previously COO of Shanda (NASDAQ: SNDA), which became the largest Internet company in China by market capitalization in 2004.

In 2016, Chen is listed on 40 under 40 (Fortune magazine) as one of the most influential young leaders in China. Chen is also ranked 43rd on Fortune's 2017 list of The Top 50 Most Influential Business Leaders in China.

== See also ==
- WiFi Master Key
