= Eric X. Li =

Chinese venture capitalist (born 1968)

Eric Xun Li
- 李世默
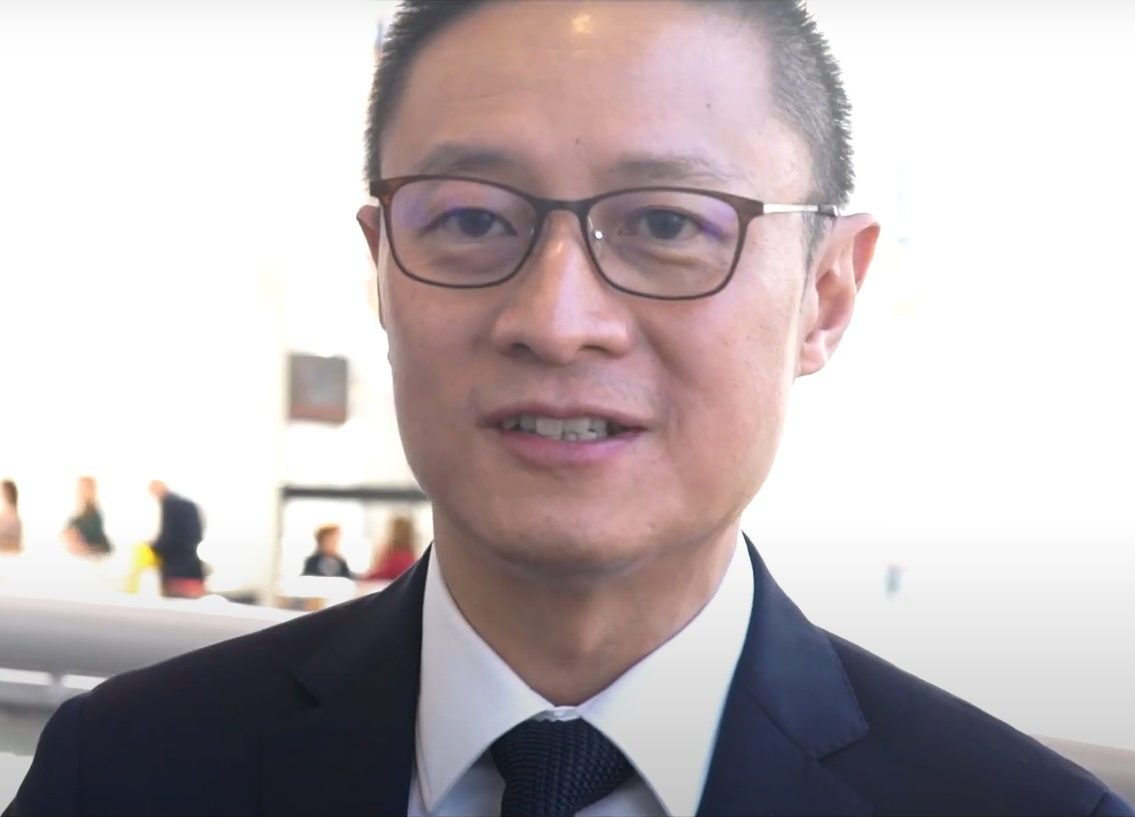
- Li in 2019
- Born: Li Shimo; May 4, 1968 (age 58); Shanghai, China
- Education: University of California, Berkeley (BA); Stanford University (MBA); Fudan University (PhD)
- Occupations: Venture capitalist, political scientist

Chinese name
- Chinese: 李世默
Transcriptions
Standard Mandarin
- Hanyu Pinyin: Lǐ Shìmò

Eric Xun Li, born Li Shimo (Chinese: 李世默; born May 4, 1968), is a Chinese venture capitalist and political scientist. He founded the Chinese nationalist news site Guancha.cn (观察者网), and is a member of the board of directors at the China Europe International Business School, as well as a trustee of the China Institute at Fudan University. Li has several opinion pieces published in Western media outlets where he criticizes liberal democracy and praises what he calls the "Chinese meritocratic system" and the Chinese political leadership.

== Early life and education ==
Li was born in Shanghai and raised by his grandmother, while his parents worked as academics in Beijing. He went to the United States for higher education in the late 1980s. He graduated from the University of California, Berkeley, with a BA in economics and earned an MBA from Stanford University. He later earned his PhD in political science from Fudan University.

== Business ventures ==
In 1999, Li returned to China and established Chengwei Capital, a venture capital fund. With a cumulative total investment exceeding $2 billion U.S. dollars, the firm has invested in over 100 companies across various sectors such as communication software, enterprise software, financial services, IC design, niche component manufacturing, healthcare, and media. Its top investments include Sunny Optical Technology, AAC Technologies, Sungrow Power Supply, Hanting Hotel, Youku, China Renaissance, AInnovation, and Roivant Sciences. Its current investment portfolio also includes a number of unicorns, among them, Hellobike, WM Motor, Baibu, XAG, Sila Nanotechnologies, and StarFive. He serves as a member of the board of directors of the RISC-V International Association.

Li has worked with Rao Jin's venture, April Media.

Li is one of the founders of Guancha, a digital news platform.

== Views ==
Zihao Chen of University College London described Guancha as having "very conservative political attitudes".

Li praises the Communist Party, stating that it is adaptable, has a meritocratic system, and the confidence of the Chinese people.

Li has written opinion pieces for influential newspapers and magazines. In an op-ed he wrote for The New York Times in 2012, he said that China needed a different development framework around a different idea of modernity.

In a 2012 op-ed and a 2013 TED Talk, Li advocated for China's one-party state on the grounds of "pluralism", saying that China has prospered under a "meritocratic system" and alleviated poverty without elections, and that its system is superior to Western democracy in several respects. Some commentators have deemed Li's talk to be pro-China propaganda spread on a Western platform, using Western-style arguments and flexible rhetorics.

In a 2018 opinion piece he wrote for The Washington Post, Li argued it was "a good thing" that Xi Jinping abolished the two-term limits for the president of China. In a 2020 op-ed he wrote for Foreign Policy, Li said that Xi is a "good emperor".

In a 2020 interview with David Barboza, Eric Li described the China Policy of the Trump administration as an "irrational rivalry".

In a 2021 opinion piece he wrote for The Economist, Li criticized liberal democracy in favor of the "current Chinese government" (which he described as a different form of democracy).

== Affiliations ==
Li also serves on the board of directors of China Europe International Business School (CEIBS), the board of Stanford University's Graduate School of Business and the Freeman Spogli Institute (FSI). He is a trustee of Fudan University's China Institute, a trustee of the Berkeley Art Museum and Pacific Film Archive of the University of California, Berkeley, a trustee of the San Francisco Symphony, a trustee of Asia Society Hong Kong, a member of the international board of the New York Philharmonic, a member of the Council of the International Institute for Strategic Studies (IISS), which organizes the annual Shangri-La Dialogue.

== Published works ==
=== Books ===
- Party Life: Chinese Governance and the World Beyond Liberalism. Palgrave Macmillan Singapore. 2023.

=== Articles ===
- Party of the Century, Foreign Affairs, Oct 26, 2022
- The CCP’s Greatest Strength Is “Self-Reinvention”, Foreign Policy, July 2, 2021
- Why Xi’s Lifting of Term Limits is a Good Thing, The Washington Post, Apr 2, 2018.
- Under Xi, a Chinese renaissance is assured, contrary to what the West believes, South China Morning Post, Nov 1, 2017
- Watching American Democracy in China, Foreign Affairs, Apr 19, 2016
- Why China’s Political Model Is Superior, The New York Times, Oct 6, 2014
