= Shanda =

Chinese video game developer

Shanda Group
- Formerly: Shanda Interactive Entertainment Limited (Chinese: 盛大互动娱乐有限公司; pinyin: Shèngdà Hùdòng Yúlè Yǒuxiàn Gōngsī)
- Type: Private
- Genre: Investment firm
- Founded: 1999 (27 years ago) in Shanghai, China
- Founders: Chen Tianqiao; Chrissy Luo; Chen Danian
- Headquarters: Menlo Park, California, United States
- Number of locations: Shanghai; Hong Kong; Singapore; New York; Menlo Park
- Areas served: Multinational
- Key people: Chen Tianqiao; (CEO and chair); Chrissy Luo; (vice chair)
- Number of employees: 50 (2018)
- Website: shanda.com

The Shanda Group is a privately owned multinational investment firm. With offices in Shanghai, Singapore, Hong Kong, New York and Redwood City, the firm invests in public markets, real estate and venture capital, focusing on companies in the fields of healthcare, financial services, media, and technology.

The company was established in December 1999 as Shanda Interactive Entertainment Limited, an online gaming company known for publishing and operating games such as The World of Legend and Magical Land. By 2004, Shanda was the largest online game company in China, and its listing on the NASDAQ that year under ticker SNDA was the largest initial public offering for a Chinese internet company in the United States. Shanda Interactive later diversified and its gaming unit spun off in 2009, raising $1.04 billion in an IPO (GAME).

The Shanda Group was taken private in 2012 by its founders, and by 2017 it had $8 billion in net assets under management.

== History ==
=== 1999–2003: Start in online gaming ===
Shanda Interactive Entertainment Limited was founded in December 1999 by Chen Tianqiao, Chrissy Luo, and Chen Danian. With headquarters in Shanghai, and US$60,000 in startup capital, the company also raised $3 million to focus on online cartoons, gaming and virtual communities. Settling on online gaming, in 2001 the company used the final $300,000 of its startup funds to buy the Chinese rights to Legend of Mir II, licensing the game from the South Korean company WeMade Soft. Published in China that September, the game began to turn a profit after two months.

Expanding out of Shanghai city by city, Shanda Interactive shared its revenue with regional telecommunications companies. Because home internet access in China was limited at the time, Shanda Interactive began constructing a network of around 200,000 internet cafes. The company also began selling pre-paid cards to purchase game time, eventually establishing around 400,000 retail outlets. Shanda continued to license international online games after Mir II, and at the end of 2002 the company had $42 million in revenue and $17 million in net profits, with an average of 280,000 people playing its games simultaneously. Shanda ceased partnering with WeMade in 2003 after a dispute over sharing profits on Legend of Mir 2, developing its own game The World of Legend in-house. WeMade considered the game to be a copy of Mir 2 and sued, reaching a settlement in 2009.

=== 2004–2005: IPO and acquisitions ===
Legend of Mir 2 and World of Legend accounted for 87.5 percent of Shanda Interactive's revenue in the first quarter of 2004. To reduce dependence on those two games, Shanda released the self-developed game The Sign in February 2004, and by April was also working on the in-house titles Age and Magical Land. Shanda Interactive listed on the NASDAQ in May 2004, raising $152 million with the initial public offering (IPO) under the ticker SNDA and becoming the first Chinese online games company listed in the United States. At the time it was the largest IPO of a Chinese internet company in the United States, and shortly afterwards Shanda became the largest internet company by market capitalization in China. In October 2004 Shanda issued US$275 million convertible notes to be redeemable in October 2007. That month Shanda was operating eight games and hosting 1.2 million simultaneous players. As of May 2005, 300,000 locations, among them 130,000 internet cafes, sold prepaid cards for Shanda's games and game usage was "up 70% from a year earlier".

Shanda purchased about 20% of Sina.com for $230 million in 2005, becoming Sina's largest shareholder. Operating as an online advertising firm, Sina.com was the most popular internet portal in China at the time. In 2004, Shanda acquired online literature website Qidian. In 2005, Shanda also began working with search engine Baidu and partnered with Universal Music Group to support music streaming on PCs in China. Shanda revealed two hardware products in October 2005. The EZ mini was a handheld wireless gaming device, while the EZ Center/EZ Pod software for was remote PC control. Shanda employed 2,000 game developers at its headquarters at the end of 2005, and had recently purchased motion-capture equipment to speed the animation process. With six game titles at the time, four of those had been developed in-house. On average, Shanda's revenues doubled each year between 2001 and 2005, and at the end of 2005 it had a market capitalization of $1.8 billion and was China's biggest gaming company. Founder Chen Tianqiao was estimated to have a net worth of $1.45 billion, with the press dubbing him the "Chinese Bill Gates".

=== 2005–2007: Free-to-play model ===
In the summer of 2005, Shanda Interactive's revenue dropped significantly as its old hit Legend of Mir II began to lose subscribers. With the intent of extending the life of its older MMORPGs, in December 2005, Shanda announced that its three major games Magical Land, Woool, and Legend of Mir II would be forever be free to play. Allowing gamers to pay for in-game items instead of subscriptions, the "freemium" model was then uncommon in China. The change proved controversial in Wall Street and Shanda's share price initially dropped 70%. Shanda defended the change, arguing that free games accounted for most of the top titles in South Korea, a trend which could be replicated in China. It was later revealed that once Shanda's games adopted this model, average customer spending increased from 30 Chinese yuan to 55 Chinese yuan per quarter. Revenue rebounded after about nine months, and in 2006, Shanda Interactive's internet games sales increased 44 percent from the year prior. Shanda Interactive announced in February 2007 that the free-to-play model was proving lucrative, and shares increased 10 percent in value that day. Following Shanda's example, other Chinese online game operators began declaring many of their titles free to play. By 2007, most new games in China were using the freemium model.

In July 2006, Motorola announced it would launch wireless versions of Shanda's games in China, with World of Legend and Magical Land to be playable on certain Motorola E680g handsets. By November 2006, Shanda was expanding from online games into an "entertainment empire on the Internet, mobile phones and TVs", according to China Daily. Shanda sold 4 million shares of Sina Corp for $129 million in February 2007. In June 2007, Shanda Interactive signed licensing and distribution agreements to expand World of Legend, Magical Land and Crazy Kart into Vietnam, Hong Kong and Macao. In November 2007, Shanda Interactive purchased a 30 percent stake in NCsoft China, giving Shanda the rights to distribute the popular game Aion in China.

=== 2008–2009: Shanda Literature ===
Shanda Games Limited had become a business unit of Shanda Interactive by early 2008, and Shanda Interactive continued to diversify. In 2008, Shanda Interactive established Shanda Literature Limited as a business unit with former Sina executive editor Xiaoqiang Hou as CEO. Shanda Literature began offering literature and other publications through websites, offline publication and phones. The unit purchased Qidian, Hongxiu, and jjwxc.com, three of China's biggest literary portals, as well as publishing companies such as tingbook.com, Huawentianxia, and Zhongzhibowen. Qidian was the largest Chinese online literature platform in 2008, with 20 million registered accounts. In 2009, Shanda Literature spurred controversy for promoting the popular writers Guo Jingming and vivibear, both accused of plagiarism. In 2010, Shanda Literature sued the search engine Baidu.com for providing links to pirated versions of Shanda Literature's copyrighted material. Agreeing that Baidu did not remove the links immediately upon notice, a Shanghai court ruled in Shanda's favor in May 2011.

=== 2009–2013: Spinoffs and privatization ===
In 2008, Shanda Interactive paid $80 million to acquire Mochi Media, an online game distributor in the United States. Shanda was the "largest online entertainment provider in China" by early 2009. That April the company reported that its MMORPG Aion had acquired 1 million paying users within four days of its release. In 2009, the company spun off Shanda Games in the largest IPO with the ticker GAME in the United States that year, raising $1.04 billion. At the time, Shanda Games provided 77 percent of Shanda Interactive's revenue, although the company also continued to be active in online literature, video, and other forms of entertainment. Shanda Literature controlled 90 percent of the online reading market in China by early 2010. That year Shanda Interactive recorded operating revenues of $232.3 million, 2% higher than the prior year.

By the fall of 2011, Shanda Interactive offered MMORPGs, casual games, film, music, and literature on an "integrated service platform". With most of its audiences in China, the company had subsidiaries and affiliates such as Ku6 Media. Shanda Literature was renamed Cloudary in 2011, and that October the unit filed to go public in the United States with an IPO of about $200 million. By March 2012, Cloudary was the largest online publishing platform in China, with 1.6 million authors and 6 million titles. Three years later, Cloudary was merged with Tencent Holdings.

Shareholders of Shanda Interactive Entertainment voted "overwhelmingly" in February 2012 to accept a buyout from the company's three founders. Paying $740 million for about 25 percent of the shares, Chrissy Luo, Tianqiao Chen, and Danian Chen took Shanda Interactive private in a deal that valued the company at $2.3 billion. According to the New York Times, it was "one of the biggest such deals involving a Chinese company".

=== 2014 – onwards: Shanda Group investment firm ===
By the time Tianqiao Chen sold his stake in Shanda Games in 2014, Shanda Group had become an investment firm focused on the internet and finance. After expanding Shanda with a series of rapid acquisitions, by 2015 Shanda had invested in 140 companies.

In 2015, Shanda Literature was acquired by Tencent, which combined it with Tencent Literature to create China Literature (Yuewen).

In 2016, Shanda Group acquired stakes in LendingClub, Legg Mason, and Sotheby's. After acquiring a 9.9 percent stake in Baltimore's Legg Mason that April, Shanda Group increased its stake in Lending Club to 15.1 percent in June, making it the company's single biggest investor. Shanda Group sold its 2 percent stake in Sotheby's in August 2016. By December 2016 it had also purchased a 13.8 percent stake in Community Health Systems. That month Shanda Group increased its stake in Legg Mason to 15%, remaining the largest shareholder. Shanda Group also gained two board seats in Legg Mason in 2017 and advised customizing Legg Mason's investment products for clients in China. At the start of 2017, Shanda Group had $8 billion in net assets under management.

By 2018, Shanda Group invested in public markets, real estate and venture capital, focusing on companies in the fields of healthcare, financial services, media, and technology. Shanda remained the largest shareholder in Lending Club and Community Health Systems, maintaining a minority stake in Legg Mason. By 2018, the venture capital arm of Shanda Group had invested in around 120 companies in China focused on internet and mobile software, and also had investments in around 30 "advanced technology companies" in Iceland, Indonesia, Russia, the United Kingdom, Israel, and the United States. Today it has also invested in over 55 early-stage, deep technology investment funds. With real estate in China and the United States, it is one of the larger owners of timberland in North America, In 2018, the company opened Shanda World, a large development in Shanghai with office and retail space with around 700,000 meters. Also in 2018, Shanda Group began focusing on neuroscience and brain-related companies, and had already invested in around "100 advanced technology ventures integrating virtual reality technology and neuroscience".

== Locations ==
As of 2018, Shanda Group had offices in Shanghai, Hong Kong, Singapore, New York and Menlo Park.

== See also ==
- List of asset management firms
- List of venture capital firms
