= Map (disambiguation) =

A map is a symbolic visual representation of an area.

Map or MAP may also refer to:

== Science and technology ==
=== Computing ===
- Map (computer science), or associative array, a data type composed of a collection of key/value pairs
- Map (higher-order function), used to apply a function to a list of values and return another list with the results
- MAP (file format)
- Map (parallel pattern), an idiom in parallel computing
- .map (top-level domain), a top-level domain owned by Google
- Manufacturing Automation Protocol, a set of computer network communication protocols
- Mapping of Address and Port, an IPv6 transition technology
- Mean average precision, in information retrieval
- Message Access Profile, a Bluetooth profile for exchange of messages between devices
- Mobile Application Part, a mobile phone network protocol

=== Mathematics ===
- Map (mathematics), generalizations of the concept of function
- Map (graph theory), a drawing of a graph on a surface without overlapping edges
  - Planar graph, a graph drawn on a planar surface
- Maps of manifolds
- Combinatorial map, a representation of a topological subdivision of the plane
- Functional predicate, in formal logic
- Maximum a posteriori estimation, in statistics
- Markov additive process, in applied probability
- Markovian arrival process, in queueing theory
- another term for a function, often with some sort of special structure
- another term for a morphism in category theory
- a subdivision of the plane or other surface into regions; see Four color theorem

=== Medicine and biology ===
- Map (butterfly), a butterfly of the family Nymphalidae
- Mean arterial pressure, the driving force of blood flow
- Mean airway pressure, in mechanical ventilation
- Methionyl aminopeptidase, an enzyme
- Microtubule-associated protein, a member of proteins that interact with the microtubules of the cellular cytoskeleton
- Mitogen-activated protein, a mediator of intracellular signaling
- Mussel adhesive protein
- Mycobacterium avium subsp. paratuberculosis, a strain of pathogenic bacteria
- 6α-Methyl-17α-acetoxyprogesterone or medroxyprogesterone acetate

=== Others ===
- Cognitive map, commonly referred to simply as "map", mental representations of physical locations
- Malaria Atlas Project, a non-profit data dissemination project
- Manifold absolute pressure, in an internal combustion engine
- Microwave Anisotropy Probe, an uncrewed space mission
- MAP test, a testing regimen for the flushing power of toilets
- Map–territory relation, the relationship between an object and a representation of that object
- Mind map, a visual diagram
- Missed approach point, in aviation
- Mission Augmentation Port, a proposed standard for uncrewed spacecraft docking for On-orbit satellite servicing and mission augmentation
- Modified atmosphere packaging, a food packaging technique
- Monoammonium phosphate, an ammonium compound and fertiliser

== Arts and entertainment ==
- Map (band), an indie band from California, US
- Map (painting), a 1961 oil-on-canvas painting by Jasper Johns
- Map (video games), also known as a level, area, or world
- Map, a character in Dora the Explorer
- "Map", song by Adam Lambert from the album Trespassing
- "Map", song by The Microphones from the album The Glow Pt. 2

== Organizations ==
- MAP Linhas Aéreas, a Brazilian airline
- HM Melbourne Assessment Prison, a prison in Australia
- Maghreb Arabe Press, the official Moroccan news agency
- Malaysian Advancement Party, a political party in Malaysia
- Media Access Project, a communications policy law firm and advocacy organization
- Medical Aid for Palestinians, a UK charity
- Minister of Aircraft Production, a WWII-era UK ministry, later replaced by the Ministry of Supply
- Mobile assault platoon, a platoon in the US Marine Corps
- Motorcycle Awareness Program, a motorists' safety training program
- Motorsport Association of Pakistan
- Municipal Alliance for Peace, a network to promote peace in the Middle East
- Museo de Arte de Ponce, an art museum in Puerto Rico
- Museo de Arte Precolombino (Peru), a Peruvian art museum
- Muslim Association Party, a political party in the Gold Coast (now Ghana)

== People ==
- Walter Map (1140–1210), medieval writer

== Other uses ==
- Marysville Auto Plant, a Honda automobile factory in Marysville, Ohio, US
- Austronesian languages (ISO 639 alpha-3 code: map)
- Managerial assessment of proficiency, a methodology used in human resources
- Membership action plan, for countries joining NATO
- Minimum advertised price
- Minor-attracted person, a euphemism for pedophile
- Missouri Assessment Program, standardized tests taken by students in Missouri, US

== See also ==
- All pages with titles beginning with "Map"
- Maps (disambiguation)
- Mapp (disambiguation)
- Mappy (disambiguation)
- Mapping (disambiguation)
- Maap, an island in the Federated States of Micronesia
