= Mappy (disambiguation) =

Mappy is a 1983 arcade game.

Mappy may also refer to:

- The Mappy franchise, which includes:

- Mappy-Land
- Hopping Mappy
- Mappy Kids
- Teku-Teku Mappy

- The Mappy web mapping service, from RATP Smart Systems

== See also ==
- Map (disambiguation)
- The Mapy.com web mapping service, founded as Mapy.cz
