= Moche portrait vessel =

Ancient realist statues from pre-Columbian South America

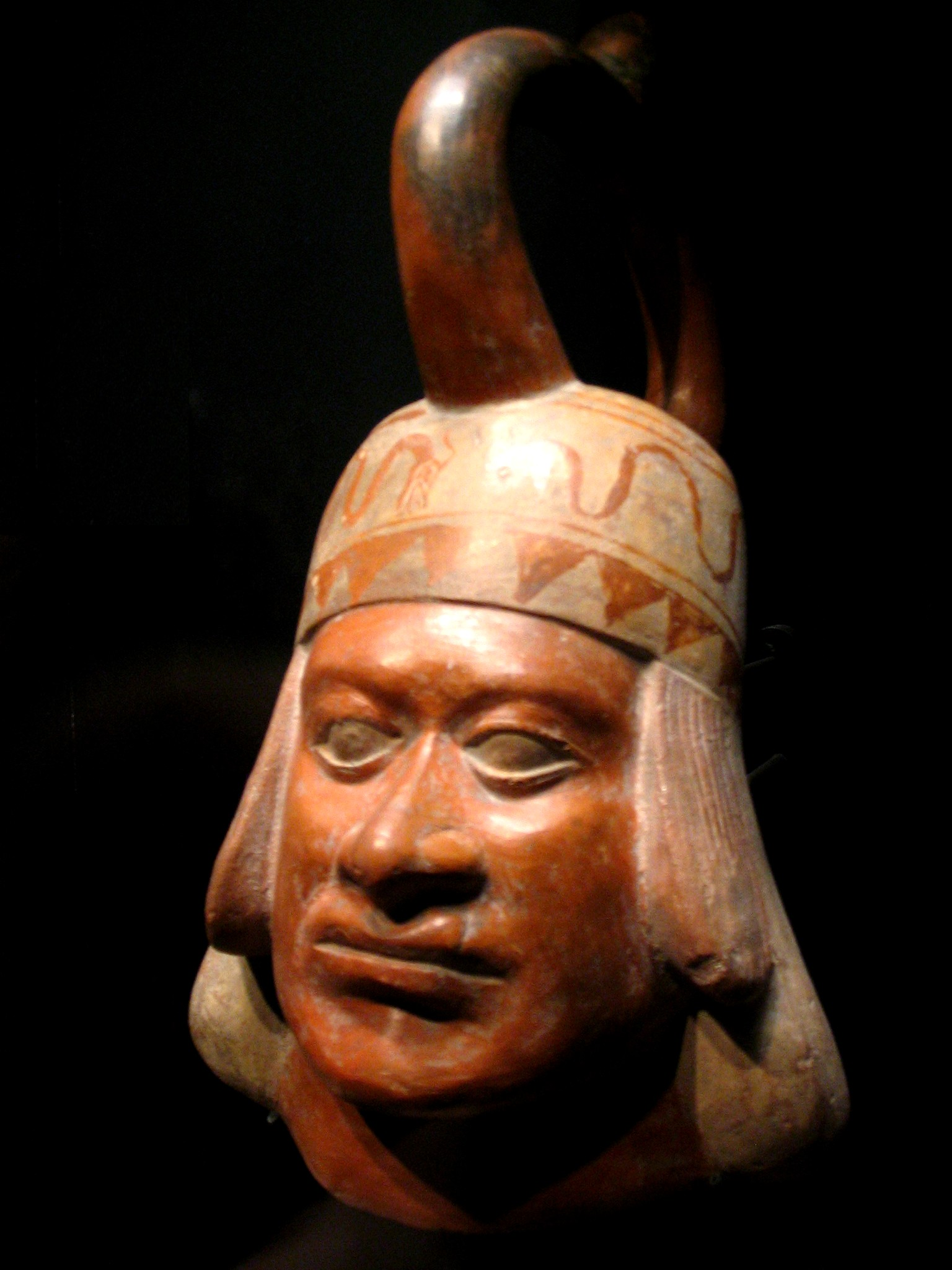
Moche portrait vessel, Musée du quai Branly, ca. 100—700 CE, 16 x 29 x 22 cm

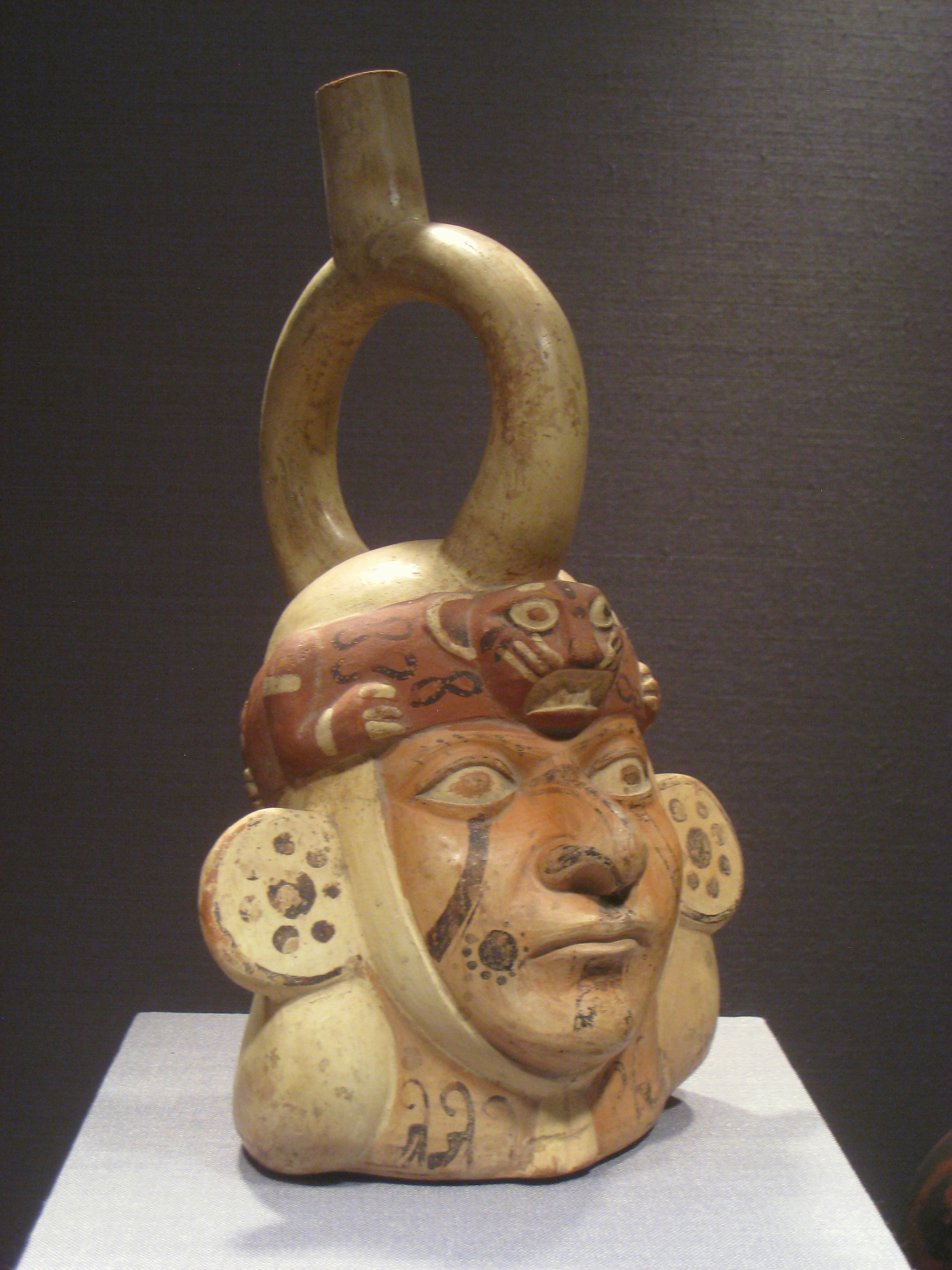
Moche portrait vessel, ca. 100—500 CE, Worcester Art Museum

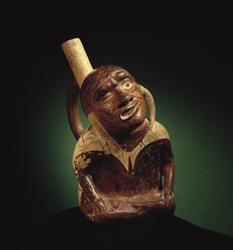
portrait vessel featuring paralysis, Larco Museum

Moche portrait vessels are ceramic vessels featuring individualized and naturalistic representations of human faces that are unique to the Moche culture of Peru.

These portrait vessels are among the few realistic portrayals of humans found in the Precolumbian Americas.

== Moche ==
The Moche culture thrived from 100—800 CE on the north coast of Peru. Their lands sat between the Pacific Ocean and the Andean cordillera. They were a stratified, agrarian society that also heavily relied on fishing.

== Characteristics of the portrait vessels ==
While most Moche portrait vessels feature heads, some portray full human figures. They are meant to hold liquids. Almost all of the portraits of are adult men. In some instances, young boys are represented, but no portrait vessels of adult women have yet been found. The portraits are not idealized, some feature abnormalities, such as harelips and missing eyes.

The vessels range from 6–45 cm in height, with most being between 15–30 cm.

Typically, Moche pottery features red slip painted on a pale cream background; however, white-on-red and black paint is also found. While most portraits are three-dimensional portrayals of humans, some have additional fineline paintings on their surface.

== Collections ==
Over 900 separate portrait vessels have been photographed by the University of California, Los Angeles. An estimated 95% of these portrait vessels were collected by looters instead of archaeologists, so the initial provenance of the vessels are unknown. Mostly they have been retrieved from graves but were used during people's lives, as evidenced by wear marks and repairs.

== Huaco Retrato Mochica ==
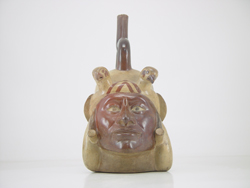
Huaco Retrato Mochica in the Larco Museum, in Lima, Peru

One famous Moche portrait vessel is known as the Huaco Retrato Mochica. The portrait was made during the Late Moche period (ca. 600 CE), according to the chronology made by Rafael Larco Hoyle in 1948. The ceramic portrait is also an example of a stirrup spout vessel of a Moche ruler. The ruler is depicted wearing a material turban on which there is a headdress decorated by a two-headed bird with feathers on side. The effigy also wears tubular earrings that can be found in the "Gold and Silver Gallery" of the Larco Museum.

The exact archaeological context in which it was found is unknown. Nonetheless, information gained from various archaeological discoveries in the North Coast over the past 20 years suggests that it belonged to the tomb of a member of the Moche elite. Archaeologists found this type of headdress, made of reed, in the tomb of the warrior priest god in the Huaca de la Cruz, an archaeological site situated in the Virú Valley, 40 km (25 mi) south of Trujillo, explored by Strong and Evans in 1940. It may also have been excavated from within the Moche Valley in the southern Moche region.

Rafael Larco Hoyle received this piece from his father, Rafael Larco Herrera. It is said that this was the only ceramic piece Herrera kept when he bequeathed his private collection to the Museo del Prado in Madrid, Spain and that Herrera gave it to his son who later opened his private collection to the public at the Larco Museum.

== See also ==
- Huaco (pottery)
- Moche Crawling Feline
- Peruvian art
- Mississippian culture pottery
