= Homosexuality in pre-Columbian Peru =

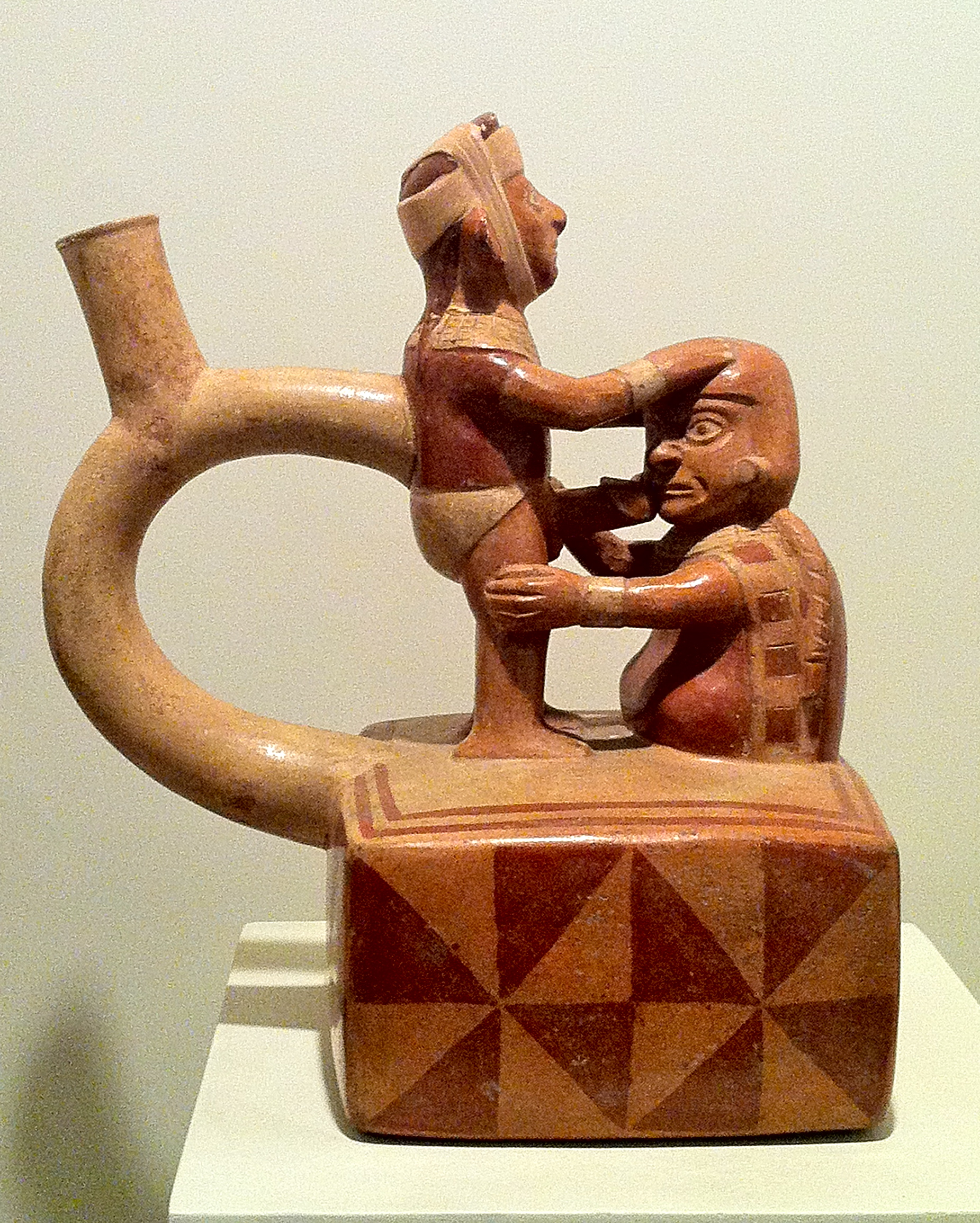
Erotic ceramics of Larco Museum in Lima

Some evidence for homosexual behavior in pre-Columbian Peru has survived since the Spanish conquest of Peru in the form of erotic ceramics (Spanish: huacos eróticos). Same-sex relationships are also described in accounts of Catholic Missionaries in the 16th century. Such pottery originated from several ancient civilizations of Peru, the most famous of these being the Moche, Recuay, and Chimu cultures. The ceramics often served a religious function as funeral offerings until they were exhumed from graves and destroyed by Spanish conquistadors. Aymara and Quechua speaking peoples in Peru today do not have a unified stance on same sex relationships. Their communities are influenced in varying degrees by the legacies of the Incan and Spanish empires, which legally condemned sexual relationships between men.

== Pre-Columbian Era ==
In pre-Columbian times, different ethnic groups existed in Ancient Peru. Gender studies carried out for this period are scarce, and very little is known about pre-Columbian homosexual practices. Gender and sexuality in ancient Peru does not directly translate onto common understandings of gender and sexuality in the contemporary West. In some temples in the Andes and the coast there were what could be considered gender nonconforming, non-binary, or transgender people today. Fray Domingo de Santo Tomás described people who he viewed as males but from a young age occupied the social roles of women, dressed like women, spoke like women, and behaved like women.

=== Moche culture ===
In the Moche culture, developed in northern Peru between 300 BC. and the 700s AD, homosexuality would have been perceived normally, as attested by its ceramics. 40% of the ceramics (locally called "huacos") represent homosexual relationships. A well known example is the ceramic presented by Kauffmann Doig in 1978 which depicted a Moche priest and a Recuay man having sex. Later, with the arrival of the Spanish conquistadors, many of these "huacos" were destroyed for being considered immoral, a practice that continued until the 20th century. In the 1920s indigenismo ideology contributed to researchers and archaeologists censoring same sex relationships in Moche, Recuay, and Chimu cultures. Same sex relationships were seen as offensive to Peruvian national identity and a corruption of an idealized and romanticized imagination of Indigenous Peru.

=== Inca Empire ===
According to the chronicler Pedro Cieza de León in Crónica del Perú, unlike the rest of the Inca Empire, the practice of homosexuality was tolerated in the north (Chinchaysuyo) and even considered an act of worship, with a male brothel existing that attended to the needs of the troop. These sexual servants were known as pampayruna.

Each temple or main shrine has a man, two or more depending on the idol, who are dressed as women, and with these, almost by way of sanctity and religion, the lords and principals have their carnal council.

— Crónica del Perú.

Likewise, the Incas had special consideration for lesbians whom they called holjoshta. Some holjoshtas had roles in war and combat. The Inca Capac Yupanqui used to have a very special affection for these women.

Men who had sex with other men were called warminchu in Quecha. In the center and the south of the empire the Incas severely punished warminchu. The chronicler Martín de Murúa commented in his General History of Peru that the Inca Lloque Yupanqui punished "with great severity public sins - stealing, killing – and sodomy, for which he restrained, plucked his ears, pulled his nose and hanged him, and he cut the necks of the nobles and principals or tore their shirts.” Some experts believe the Inca Empire punished both same sex relations and masturbation because of kairhuarmi. Kairhuarmi is a Quechua word that describes the belief that men and women have differences that are only resolved by their union. Maintaining difference between genders would have been important to Incan power structures where women were unequally represented in politics.

The Inca Garcilaso de la Vega relates in his Royal Commentaries of the Incas that homosexuality in the Inca Empire was prohibited and that "sodomites" were persecuted and burned alive.

They had found that there were some sodomites, not in all the valleys, but in each one, not in all the common neighbors, but in some individuals who secretly used that evil vice... The Inca was happy with the story of the conquest. ... And in particular he ordered that with great diligence an investigation be made of the sodomites and in a public square they would burn alive those who were found not only guilty but initiated, no matter how little... they would also burn their houses and tear them down to the ground and burn them. the trees of their estates, uprooting them... and they proclaimed by an unforgettable law that from then on they should guard against falling into such a crime, under penalty that for the sin of one, their entire town would be devastated and all its inhabitants in general burned.

— Comentarios reales de los incas

For his part, Cieza de León commented in his Chronicle of Peru that the Incas punished those who practiced homosexuality: "they hated those who used it, considering them as vile timid people and that if it was known to anyone that such a sin had committed, they punished him with such a penalty that it would be pointed out and known among everyone." Societies in the central coast of Peru that were conquered by the Inca empire, for example the Chancay, had distinct religious and cultural beliefs for centuries about sexuality that changed as they were incorporated into the Inca Empire.

=== Aymara people ===
In the case of the Aymaras, who reside southwest of the Peruvian mountains, there are different opinions. According to the superstitions of certain sub-ethnic groups, they are also said to be an omen of bad luck. In some communities, non-heteronormative sexualities are associated with lacking traditional masculinity and being a qachu, which is a slur for gay men. Although some communities have a certain degree of acceptance, respect, and understanding of these people for their sexual orientation. In others, homosexuals were frequently considered special, magical beings, who were endowed with supernatural powers and recognized for their powers to be shamans.

== Arrival of the Spanish and banning of homosexuality ==
Once the Spanish arrived in the 16th century, they were astonished at the sexual practices of the natives. Viceroy Francisco de Toledo and the priests were aghast to discover that homosexuality was accepted and that the indigenous population also did not prohibit premarital sex or hold female chastity to be of any particular importance.

The historian Maximo Terrazos describes how the Spanish reconciled this native sexuality with Catholicism:

Toledo ordered natives evangelized and those "caught cohabiting outside church-sanctioned wedlock would receive 100 lashes with a whip 'to persuade these Indians to remove themselves from this custom so detrimental and pernicious'. Toledo also issued several decrees aimed at creating near total segregation of the sexes in public. Violations were punishable by 100 lashes and two years' service in pestilential state hospitals. Under the Inquisition, brought to Peru in 1569, homosexuals could be burned at the stake."

— Maximo Terrazos, historian

However, homosexuality in Peru was decriminalised in 1837.

== Ceramics ==
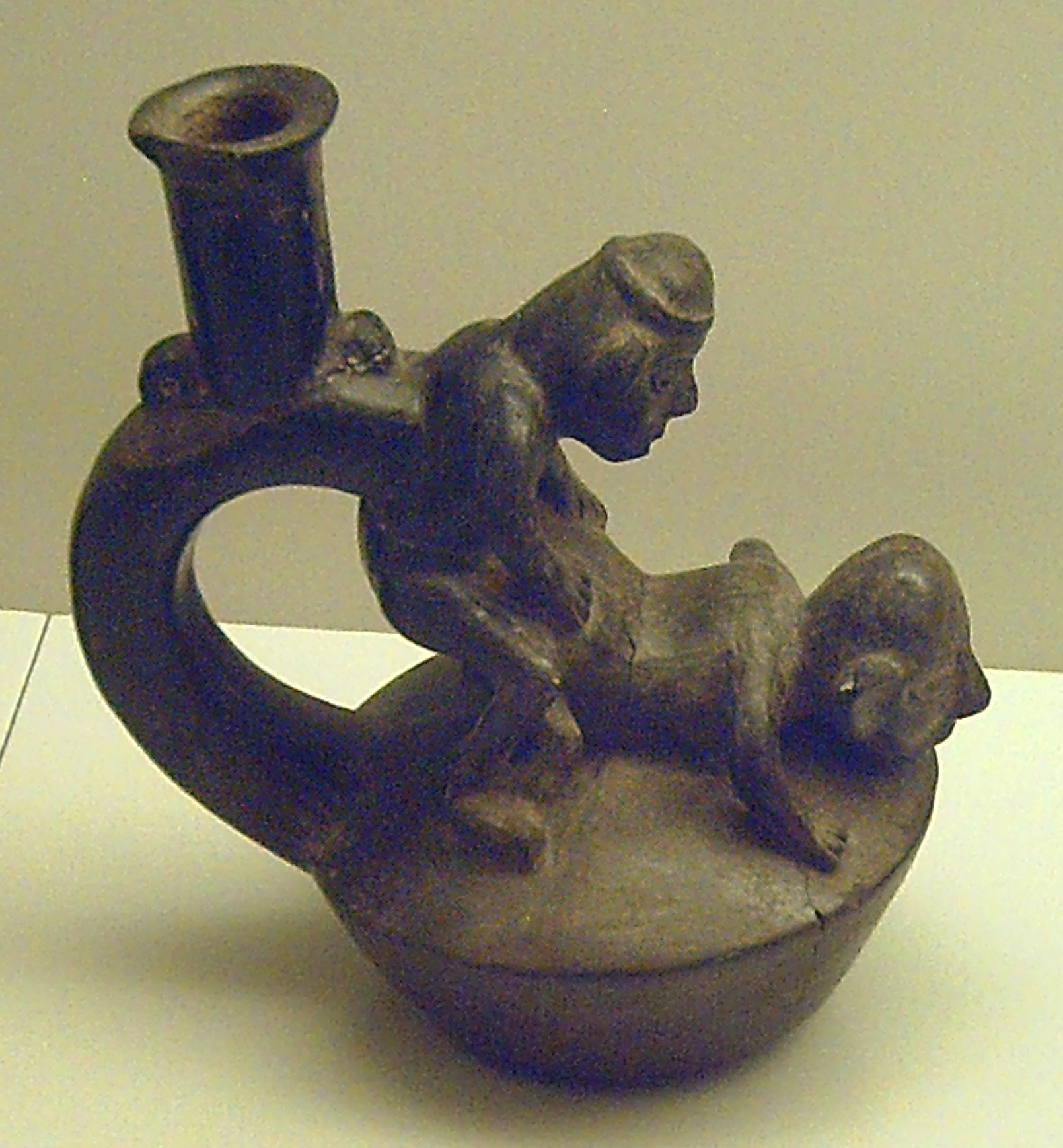
A huaco from the Chimú culture (1000–1400) depicting 2 men engaging in anal sex.

Over a span of 800 years, pre-Columbian central Andean cultures, especially the Moche, created at least tens of thousands of ceramics (Spanish: huacos). A few such ceramics show skeletons undeniably engaged in homosexuality; four depict gay male anal intercourse, one depicts lesbian penetration with the clitoris. Many others show partners where at least one member is of indeterminate sex, like the oral sex ceramic shown above, where the genitalia of the person on their knees is not visible. Such works, due perhaps to heterosexist bias, have often been interpreted as depicting a heterosexual couple.

=== Destruction ===
Many of the ceramics, along with most indigenous icons, were smashed. In the 1570s, Toledo and his clerical advisers organized to eliminate sodomy, masturbation, and a common social practice that was roughly translated from the native Quechua as "trial marriage." As Terrazos describes, "You couldn't talk about them because they were considered [pornographic]." They were prohibited by the "taboo imposed by the Christian religion that men have sex only for procreation and that women do not experience sexual pleasure."

=== Survival ===
In spite of the organized effort to destroy these artifacts, many have survived to the present day. Some are currently used in personal religious worship by a few Quechua and Aymara speaking Indigenous communities in the Andean region. For decades, the erotic ceramics were locked away from the public and accessible only to an elite group of Peruvian social scientists. Occasionally and reluctantly they were made available to select foreign researchers from the United States and Europe. The Larco Museum in Lima, Peru, is famous for its gallery of pre-Columbian erotic pottery.

== See also ==
- LGBT rights in Peru
