= MAPP =

MAPP or Mapp may refer to:

- MAPP gas, a fuel for brazing and soldering torches
- Mapp (surname)
- Mid-continent Area Power Pool, a part of the American Midwest Reliability Organization
- Mapp Biopharmaceutical, manufacturers of ZMapp Ebola vaccine
- Mapp and Lucia, a series of novels featuring Miss Mapp
- MAPP Property Management, managers of the Braehead Soar and Eldon Square Shopping Centres
- Measurement of Academic Performance and Progress, former name of the California Assessment of Student Performance and Progress (CAASPP)

== See also ==
- Mapp v. Ohio, American law case in criminal procedure
- Map (disambiguation)
