= Stirrup spout vessel =

Type of drinking vessel

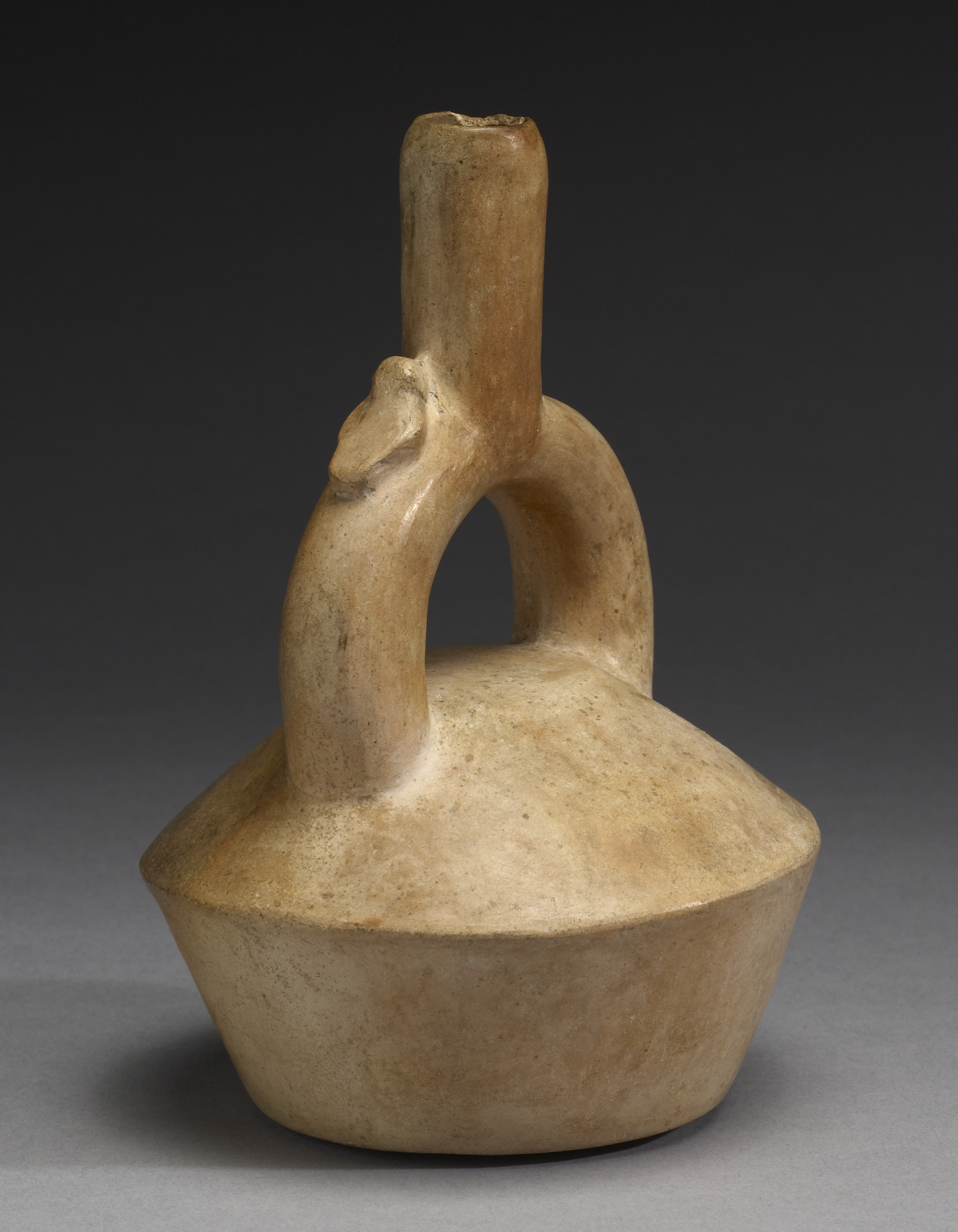
Chimú Stirrup Vessel, between 1100 and 1550. The Walters Art Museum.

A stirrup spout vessel (so-called because of its resemblance to a stirrup) is a type of ceramic vessel common among several Pre-Columbian cultures of South America beginning in the early 2nd millennium BCE.

Stirrup spout vessels were crafted by the Chavin and the Moche. The stirrup "handle" is hollow and forms part of the spout, which emerges from the top of the stirrup. The jars, which were often elaborately figurative, would be cast from a mold, while the spout was built by hand and welded to the vessel with slip.

== Moche Culture and Stirrup Spout Vessels ==
In the river valleys of Northern coastal Peru, the Moche culture grew and flourished around 100 CE. For nearly 600 years, the Moche culture developed and expanded throughout the major river valleys in the dry coastal plains of Peru. The Moche built large, monumental temples, vast irrigation canals and systems, and various, diverse artworks and ceramics.

Moche artwork depicts a wide array of practices, resources, and important figures of the time, depicting men, women, plants, gods, deities, and anthropomorphic figures engaging in activities such as hunting, fishing, combat, sex, warfare, and ritual observance. Research has uncovered a wide array of artwork, mostly in the form of Moche ceramics. The Moche built a large number of stirrup spout vessels, which were used as practical household wares, but also for artistic purposes, such as depicting important leaders. Stirrup spout vessels appeared early in the Andean region. Examples of vessels in spherical, oblate, cylindrical, cube-like, angled, or molded forms have been discovered. Thousands of these stirrup spout vessels have been recovered from archaeological sites.

There are two main types of these vessels in Moche ceramics. The first category includes vessels made by employing three-dimensional molds to shape clay into a figure, including the popular Moche portrait vessels. These vessels usually depicted the heads and figures of adult men modeled in painstaking detailed, and researchers believe that they portray high-ranking men throughout Moche history.

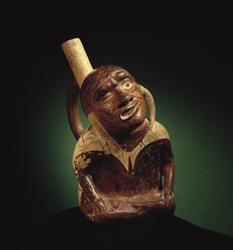
Portrait vessel depicting paralysis, Larco Museum

The second category includes pottery adorned with line painting. These pieces disclose glimpses of Moche society: patterns of daily life in Pre-Columbian America, their narrative mythologies, and ritual practices throughout the region. These paintings have been classified into five major groups by Christopher B. Donnan and Donna McClelland, namely: Vessel Forms, Daily Life, the Natural World, the Supernatural, and Narrative Themes.

=== Erotic Moche Ceramics ===
Thousands of stirrup spout vessels have been discovered, with at least 500 of them bearing erotic imagery. Although the vessels display a sweeping range of sexual acts, conventional vaginal intercourse is rare. The most common designs depict anal sex and fellatio. Other subjects include gods, deities, dancing skeletons, burial, social activities, scenes of hunting, fishing, sacrifice, combat, warfare, and the copulation of animals such as two mice or two monkeys. Occasionally they depict androgyny, hermaphroditism, or STIs such as syphilis. The abundance of such vessels suggests the existence of long-lasting, active ceramic workshops that would support mass production, possibly using molds. These pots provide archaeologists with insight into Moche beliefs about reproduction and sexual practices, as well as the beliefs of other pre-Columbian cultures. Many of these vessels are on display at the Larco Museum in Lima, Peru, in a gallery entirely devoted to Moche erotic art.

A large portion of these pieces were owned by the elite in Moche society. Through the discovery of erotic ceramic ware in elite tombs, archaeologists have concluded that the Moche buried their high-ranking individuals with these pots and used the pots in some sacrificial rituals. Ritual paraphernalia and elaborate garments and ornaments were also discovered in these tombs.

=== Water in Moche Ceramics ===
Moche territory was exposed to drastic climate variations, dry summers, and rainy winters. However, occasional El Niño events disrupted this flow, either through exceptionally long droughts or devastating floods. The manipulation of water became very important to the Moche not only to survive, but to flourish. Agricultural yields were a major source of Moche wealth, both through production and trade, as a result of an immense irrigation canal system that brought water from lush valleys to the surrounding towns and villages. The canals supported urban centers, used to grow corn (maize), beans, and other crops, and helped in periods of severe drought. Access to a reliable water source allowed the Moche to grow and develop as a sedentary society.

The Moche manipulation of water has also been demonstrated by the design of the stirrup spout vessels. Water is essential for survival, and to survive in dry conditions, the Moche manipulated water from rivers and valleys to bring it where it was needed. As a piece is turned to pour water out or fill the circular "handle," water is able to flow through both or either side of the hollow pipe. The versatile design allowed for a vessel's owner to easily carry water with them wherever they went.

=== Moche Ceramic Fineline Painting ===
While no written record of the Moche has survived, their art offers a window into their culture. One tool archaeologists use to study these vessels is the creation of "rollout" photographs. Researchers Christopher B. Donnan and Donna McClelland have both worked throughout their careers to photograph and record Moche vessels in their rolled-out forms – as linear scrolls the viewer can read in a straight line, so the narratives of the vessels can be more clearly identified.

The iconography on these stirrup spout vessels shows eating practices and food preparation techniques, weaving, warfare, hunting, fashion and worn ornaments. One common overlying narrative theme is known as the Presentation Theme, which shows figures participating in a ritual sacrifice, and the drinking of blood. One example, the Moche site at Sipán, depicts several bound prisoners are being decapitated by their captors, while ornately adorned people pass around a goblet above them. It is not clear whether these ornate figures represent gods and deities, or whether they were high-ranking Moche officials in costume. The remains of a Moche leader were found at the same location, buried in the costume of the Rayed Deity commonly illustrated in the Presentation Theme.

After this discovery, two theories diverged on the nature of the Presentation Theme. One theory posited that the vessel depicted a Moche deity and that the remains of the "Lord of Sipán" were merely clothed in the same costume to resemble that deity. The other theory was that the scene did not purport to depict gods, and instead was a literal interpretation of events, a stylistic record of Moche history.

The Presentation Theme and others illustrate a natural progression of events in a narrative format. While there is no written documentation from the Moche, scholars use these artworks to construct a narrative of Moche beliefs and practices. Several of the key figures within the Presentation Theme have also been identified within the Scene of Sacrifice Theme. Other common themes include the Burial Theme, The Revolt of the Objects, the Tule Boat Theme, and the Runner Theme.

== See also ==
- Double spout and bridge vessel, another common type of vessel from Pre-Columbian South America
- Stirrup jar, a similarly named vessel of Mediterranean origin
- Moche Crawling Feline
