= Maps (disambiguation) =

Maps is the plural of map, a visual representation of an area.

Maps or MAPS may also refer to:

== Abbreviations ==
- Madras Atomic Power Station
- Mail Abuse Prevention System, an organisation that provides anti-spam support
- Meteoritics and Planetary Science, a scientific journal
- Metropolitan Area Projects Plan, a series of capital improvement programs in Oklahoma City, Oklahoma
- Military Academy Preparatory School, another name for the United States Military Academy Preparatory School
- Military Aircraft Preservation Society, USA
- Monitoring Avian Populations and Survivorship program, an initiative by The Institute for Bird Populations
- Moomba Adelaide Pipeline System, a network of gas pipelines in South Australia
- Multidisciplinary Association for Psychedelic Studies, non-profit organization that researches the use of psychedelics in therapy
- Multi-spacecraft Autonomous Positioning System, a NASA spacecraft navigation system, under test

== Cartography ==
- Apple Maps, web mapping service provided by Apple for use on their smartphones, tablets and computers
- Bing Maps, web mapping service provided by Microsoft
  - Windows Maps, web mapping client software
- Google Maps, web mapping service provided by Google
  - Google Maps (app), smartphone and tablet app version of Google's web mapping service
- Yahoo! Maps, web mapping service provided by Yahoo!
- Qwant Maps, web mapping service provided by Qwant

== Music ==
- Maps (musician), English musician
- Maps (Billy Woods and Kenny Segal album), 2023
- Maps (Get Cape. Wear Cape. Fly album), 2012
- Maps (Mixtapes album) or the title song, 2010
- Maps (EP), by Three Mile Pilot, 2012
- "Maps" (Lesley Roy song), 2021
- "Maps" (Maroon 5 song), 2014
- "Maps" (Yeah Yeah Yeahs song), 2003
- "Maps", a song by Emancipator, 2006
- "Maps", a song by Falling Up from Captiva, 2007
- "Maps", a song by the Front Bottoms from The Front Albums, 2011
- "Maps", a song by STRFKR from Being No One, Going Nowhere, 2016
- "Maps", a song written by Lisa Kron and Jeanine Tesori, from the musical Fun Home, 2013

== Other uses ==
- Maps (manga), manga by Yuichi Hasegawa (1985–1994)
- Maps Maponyane, South African media personality
- Maps, a 1986 novel by Nuruddin Farah

== See also ==
- Map (disambiguation)
