= Mapping theorem =

Mapping theorem may refer to

- Continuous mapping theorem, a statement regarding the stability of convergence under mappings
- Mapping theorem (point process), a statement regarding the stability of Poisson point processes under mappings
