= Mapp (surname) =

Mapp is a surname. Notable people with the surname include:

- Anna K. Mapp (born 1970), American chemist
- Arthur Mapp, British judoka
- Charles Mapp (1903–1978), British politician
- Corie Mapp (born 1978), British para athlete and former Lance Corporal
- Darren Mapp (born 1980), Australian rugby league player
- Eddie Mapp (c. 1910 – 1931), American blues musician
- G. Walter Mapp (1873–1941), American lawyer and politician
- Justin Mapp (born 1984), American soccer player
- Kenneth Mapp (born 1955), American politician
- Norman Mapp (1928–1988), American jazz singer and composer
- Owen Mapp, New Zealand carver
- Rhonda Mapp (born 1969), American basketball player
- Rue Mapp, American outdoor enthusiast and environmentalist
- Sally Mapp (died 1737), English bonesetter
- Wayne Mapp (born 1952), New Zealand politician
