= Anneke Borren =

New Zealand potter, born 1946

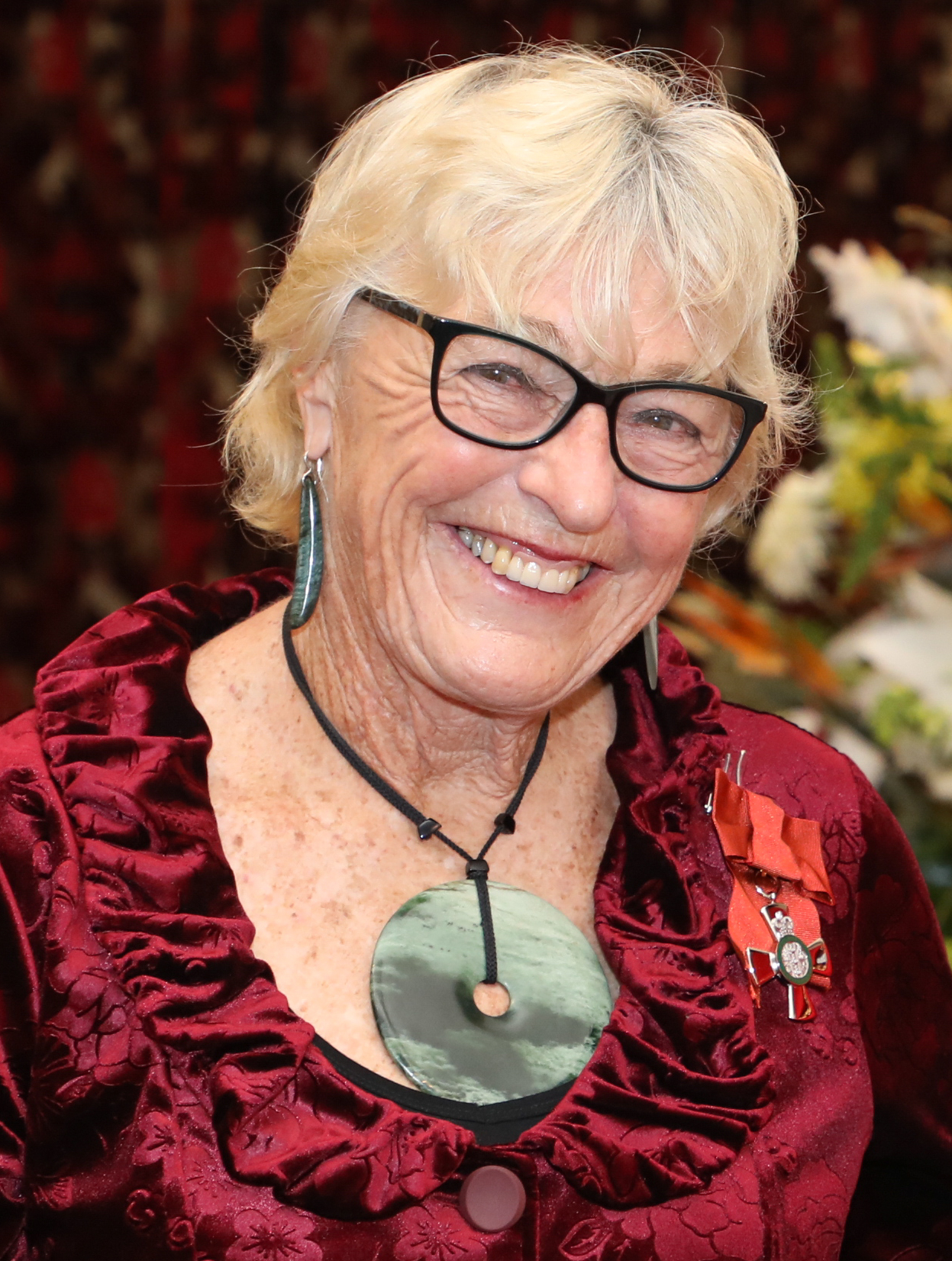
- Occupation: Ceramist
- Awards: Member of the New Zealand Order of Merit
- Website: http://www.annekeborren.co.nz

Anneke Borren MNZM (born 1946) is a potter who lives in New Zealand. Her work is in the permanent collection of Te Papa, the Christchurch Art Gallery and the Sarjeant Gallery.

== Biography ==
Borren was born in Eindhoven in the Netherlands and emigrated to New Zealand in 1963, at the age of 16. She studied at the School of Fine Arts, Christchurch followed by studies in the Netherlands, Denmark and Sweden, including at the Industrial School of Arts in Gothenburg. In 1969 she set up a ceramic studio in Paraparaumu, north of Wellington. In 1994 she established 'Chez-Moi Pottery' studio at Paremata, Wellington. In 1984 she was artist-in-residence at Whanganui Polytechnic.

Borren has served two terms as president of the New Zealand Society of Potters.

=== Awards ===
In 1984, a pot by Borren won the West Award from the New Zealand Academy of Fine Arts. Borren had the title of Member of the New Zealand Order of Merit (MNZM) conferred upon her in 2022.

== Personal life ==
Borren has two daughters with her partner, the bone carver Owen Mapp.
