= Moche Crawling Feline =

Moche ceramic stirrup spout vessel

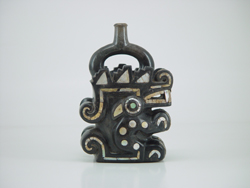
The Moche Crawling Feline

The Moche Crawling Feline is a specific stirrup spout vessel dating from 100—800 CE. This Moche ceramic effigy is currently in the collection of Larco Museum, in Lima, Peru. It comes from the North Coast of Peru. It represents a zoomorphic character: a lunar dog, or a crawling feline.

== Background ==
In the Northern cultures of Peru, ceramic is the main support to pass on the religious concepts, and was used for the principal funerary, sacrificial and fertility rituals. This type of piece was found in the funerary context of a Moche ruler and was one of the most important ways to honour him and to accompany him in his journey to the underworld.

Pre-Columbian societies were agricultural societies, their knowledge was therefore principally based on the observation of the sky (of the stars, the rain, the climate changes …), of the earth (for the agriculture), and of the subterranean world (for the medicinal plants and roots). Their way of thinking the world was therefore organized according to those three levels of the world. They adored the animals that represented those three levels: the bird for the sky and the upper world, the world of the gods, the feline for the earth and the world of here, the human world, and the reptiles (that are snakes most of the time) for the subterranean world, the underworld, the world of death.

Pre-Columbian societies were the masters of ceramic; they reached an exceptional level of sculptural quality. This comes from a precise and patient observation of nature and of their environment and from the methodic study of animals and their morphology.

The high level of their sculptural and pictorial techniques in their ceramics allowed them to increase the details in the representation of their religious subjects. The feline was one of the most important symbolic religious animals. It appears a lot in the Northern cultures and it became a major source of inspiration for Peruvian artists. It is a strong and brave animal, and it is linked to fertility and water, as it comes from the wet and fertile Amazonian grounds.

== Interpretation ==
Ultimately the species of the animal portrayed in unknown. This piece could represent a mystical animal, half feline, and half bird, decorated with nacre incrustations. The eye of this mystical character is made of turquoise. If we look at the object to the right, we can see a feline; while if we look at it to the left, we can see a bird. The eye is the link between the two. This object corresponds to the concept of the creative duality, which is very important for pre-Columbian societies. The feline’s snout is disproportionate, and the animal is seated with his paws up, in a fighting position. The nacre triangles represent the crest of the bird, which is a symbol of importance and power. The crests are at the same time a symbol for the union between the upper world and the underworld. This is very important because it explains one of the major concepts of Ancient Peru: the fact that the upper world (the world of the Earth) receives the water and the light coming from the sky, creating life.

This piece has various names: the dragon, the lunar dog, the lunar monster, or the crawling feline. We can see, for example, that the animal’s ears are not typical of those of a feline but are more those of a fox, an animal that connects the different worlds together. This piece is the expression of complementarity, of two worlds that are meeting, uniting their power. It intrigues and attracts the curiosity of the tourists of the Larco Museum because of its mysterious aspect and the obvious spirituality it carries.
