= Mapping =

Mapping may refer to:

- Cartography, the process of making a map
- Mapping (mathematics), a synonym for a mathematical function and its generalizations
  - Mapping (logic), a synonym for functional predicate

== See also ==
- Mapping theorem (disambiguation)
- Mappings (poetry)
- Surveying, the field work of gathering map data
