= Bridge-spouted vessel =

Pitcher design

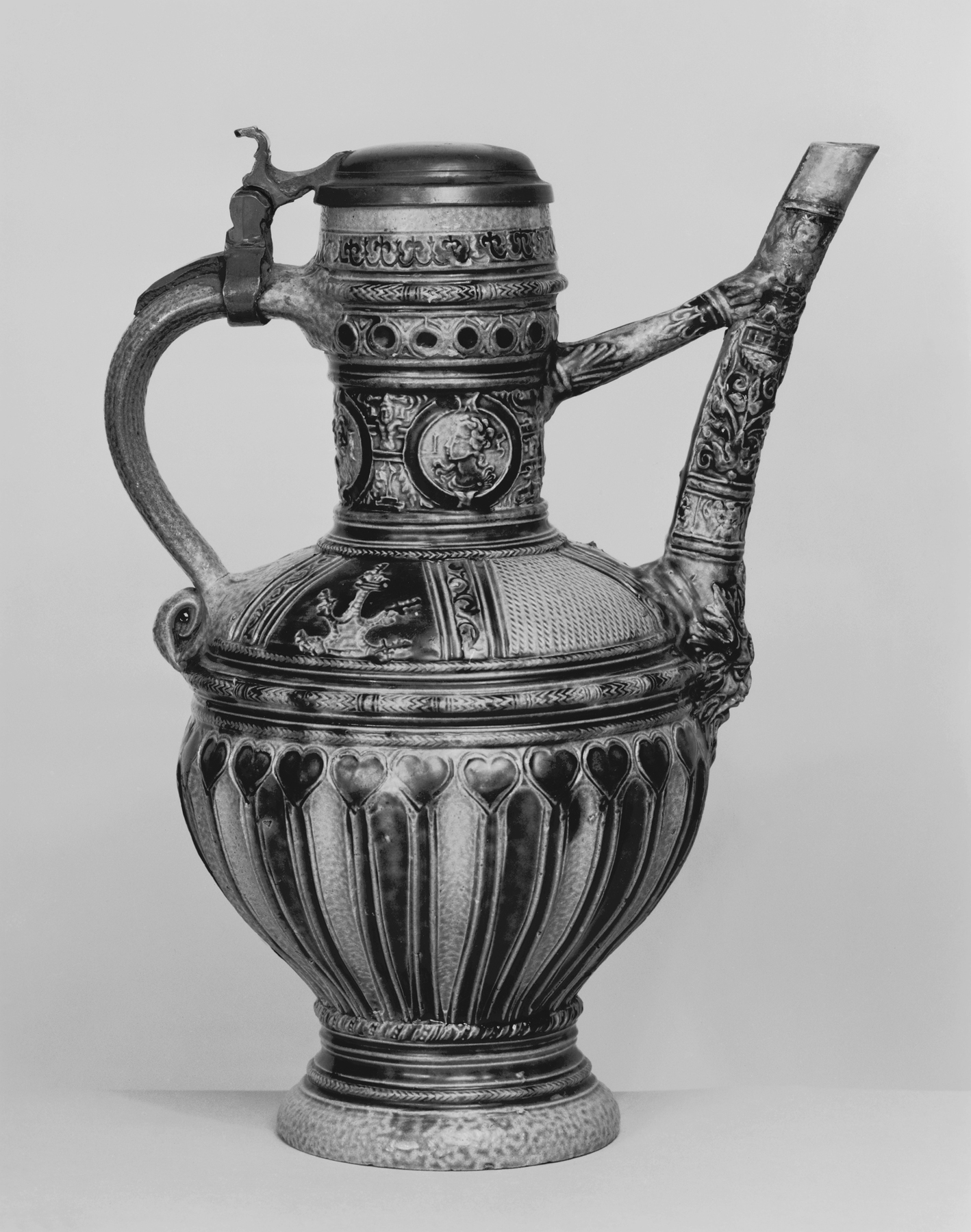
16th-century German stoneware jug

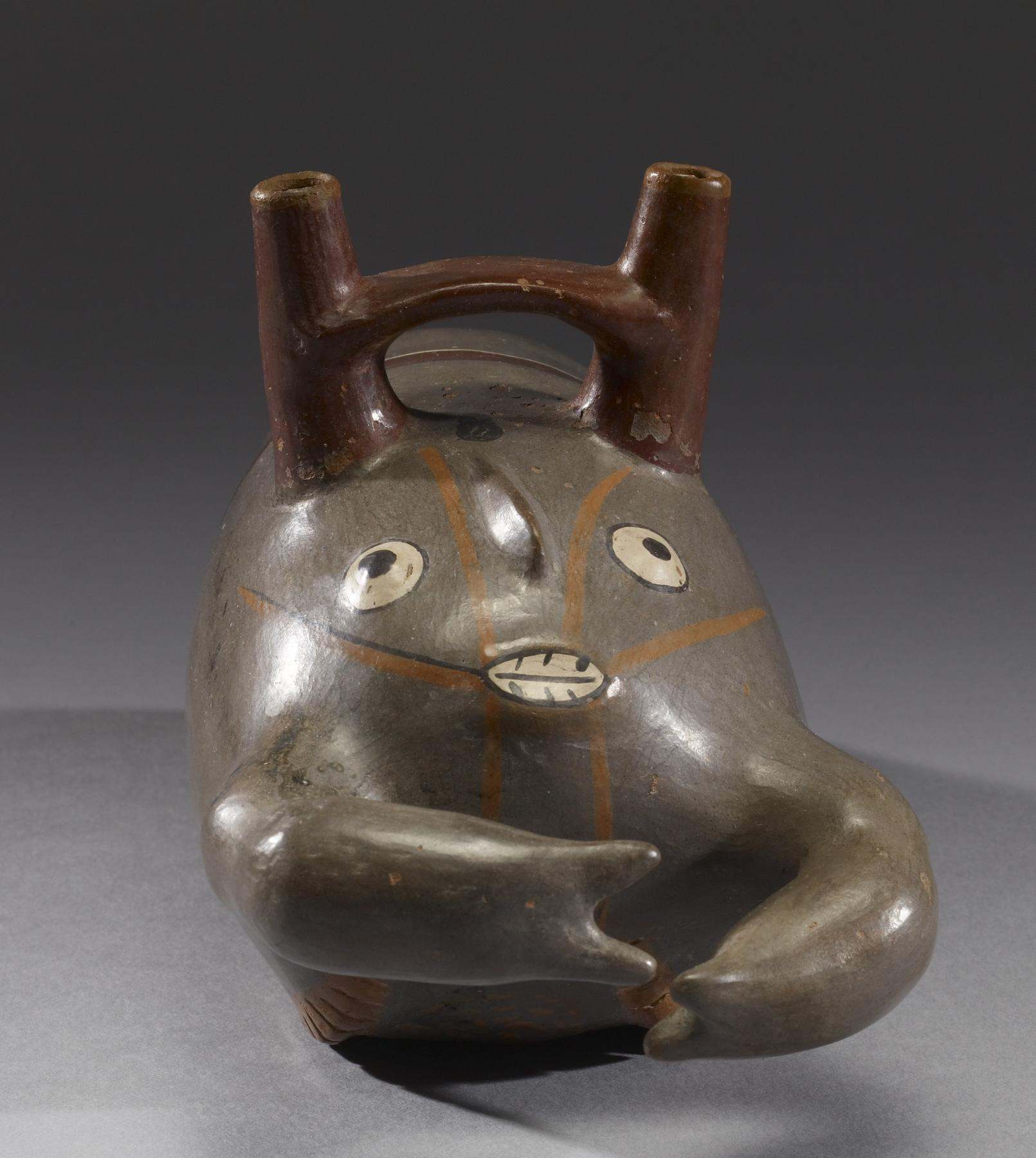
Nazca, effigy vessel formed as a lobster, AD 300–600 (Early Intermediate Phases III–IV)

A bridge-spouted vessel is a particular design of ewer (jug or pitcher) originating in antiquity; there is typically a connecting element between the spout and filling aperture, and the spout is a completely independent aperture from the usually smaller central fill opening. Early examples of the bridge-spouted vessel are found in ancient Persia in the early Iron Age and on Crete. This type of vessel typically appears in the Bronze Age or early Iron Age. A very early example of a bridge-spouted vessel in Minoan pottery has been recovered at the ancient palace of Phaistos on Minoan Crete, dating to the Bronze Age.

There is a different type, called a double spout and bridge vessel, characteristic of the pottery of the Nazca culture of Pre-Columbian Peru, where two spouts rising vertically from the body of the vessel are linked by a bridge that apparently also served as a carrying handle.

== See also ==
- Stirrup jar
