= Museo de Arte Precolombino, Cusco =

Museum in Cusco, Peru

Pre-Columbian Art Museum of Cusco
- Museo de Arte Precolombino de Cusco
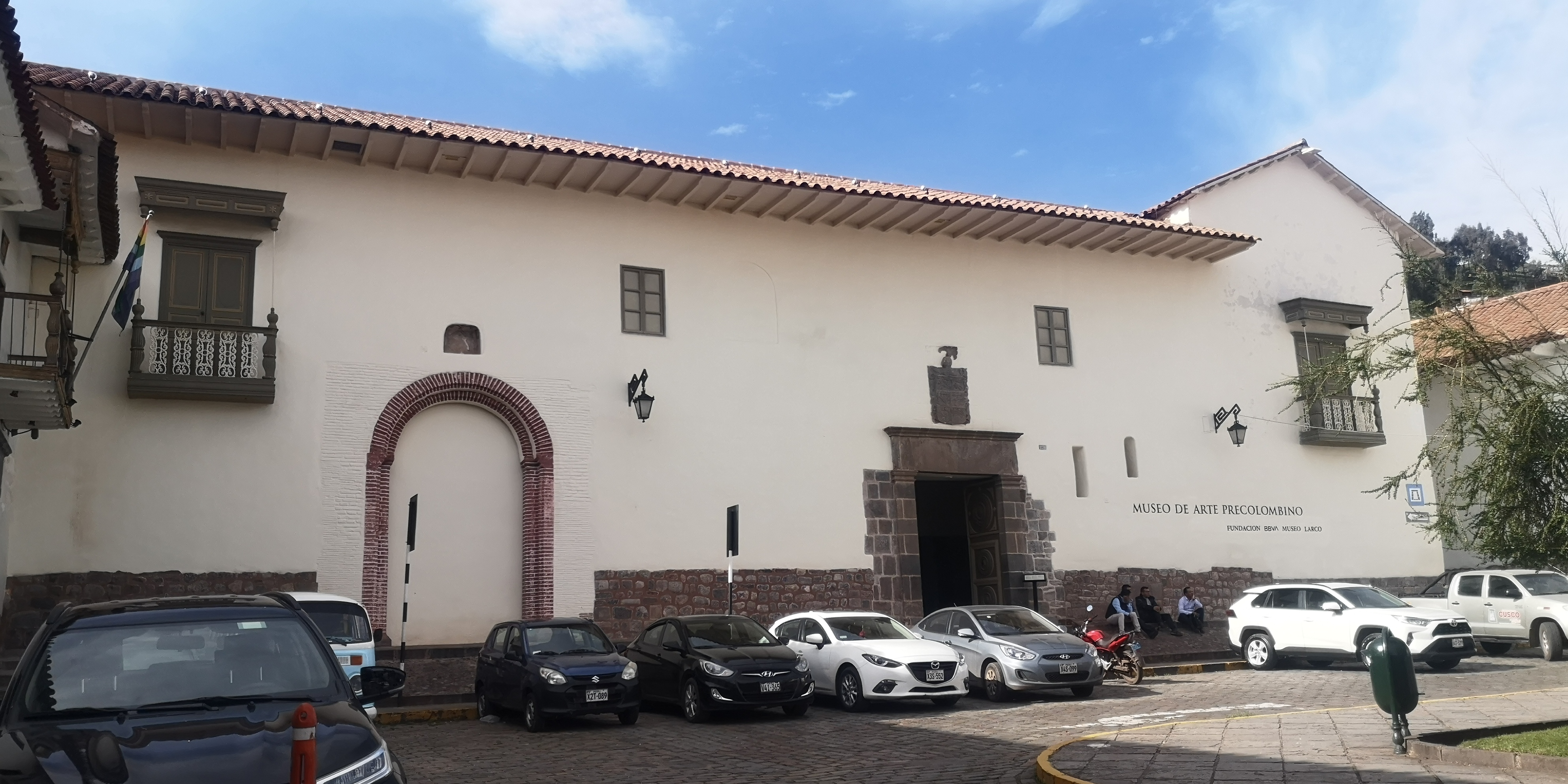
- Facade of the Museum.
- Established: June 2003
- Location: Plazoleta de las Nazarenas, Cusco, Peru
- Coordinates: 13.5150°S 71.9775°W
- Type: Art museum
- Owner: Larco Museum
- Website: mapcusco.pe/en/

The Pre-Columbian Art Museum (also known by the acronym of its Spanish name MAP) is an art museum in Cusco, Peru, dedicated to the display of archaeological artifacts and examples of pre-Columbian artworks drawn from all regions of pre-Columbian Peru. The museum is situated on Plazoleta de las Nazarenas in Cusco's San Blas district, and has on permanent display exhibitions of some 450 individual representative artifacts that are drawn from the wider collection of its parent museum, the Larco Museum in the Peruvian capital Lima.

== History of the building ==
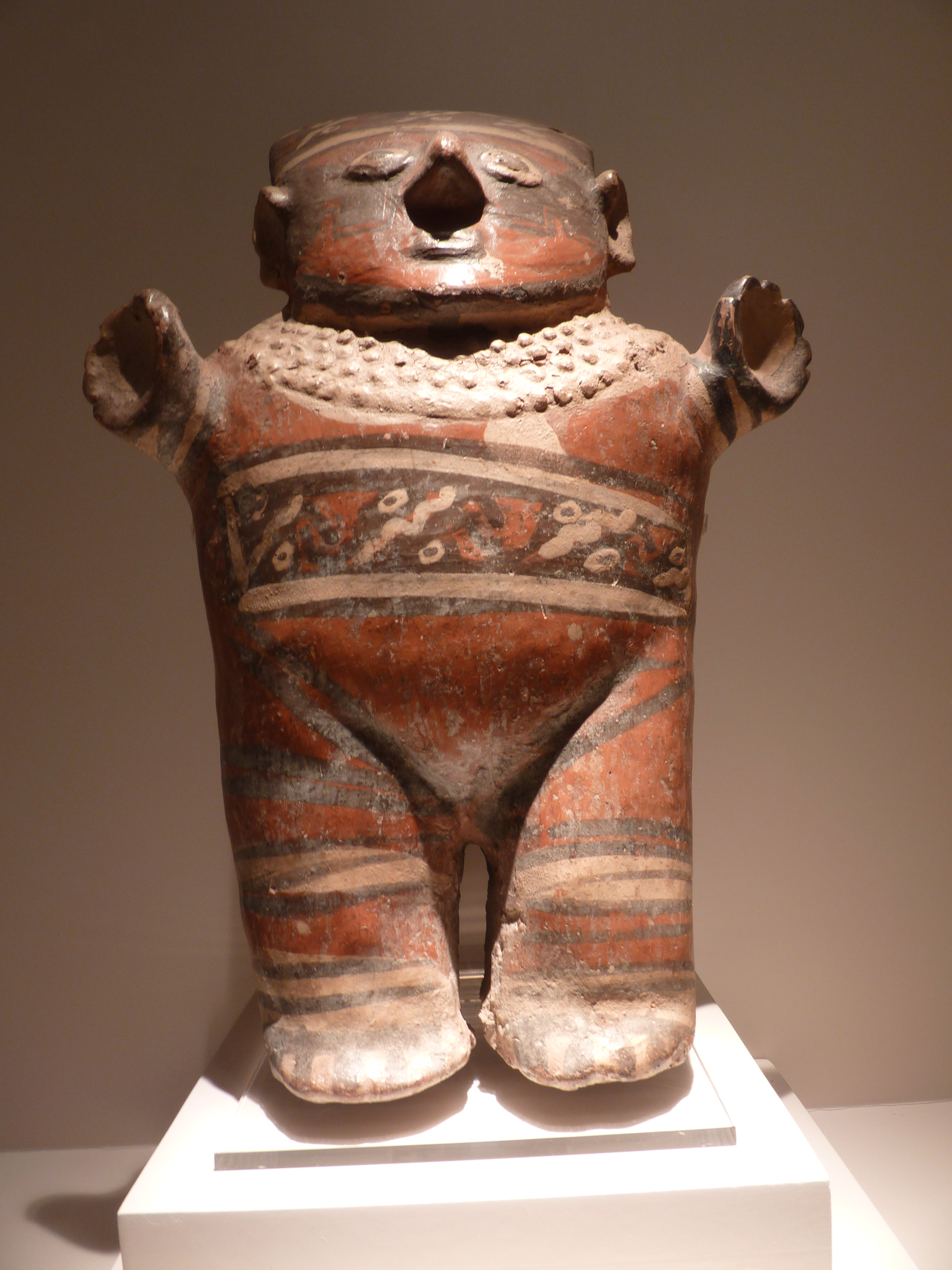
Ceramic statue from the Museum

The building where the museum is now housed was originally an Inca ceremonial courthouse. In 1580, it was acquired by the conquistador Alonso Díaz and subsequently built over in Colonial style to become the home of an elite member of Cusco society, the Viceroy Hernandez de Cabrera, for whom the mansion is named. It then passed through many hands and had multiple functions, ultimately falling into a ruinous state. After a restoration by the Fundación BBVA, the Museo de Arte Precolombino re-opened in June 2003.

Peruvian President Alejandro Toledo inaugurated the museum at the summit, saying "we are showing the world our cultural wealth. I am profoundly proud that [we can give to the summit] a little of the culture that belongs not only to Peru, but also to Latin America… [The region must] look to its past to construct together a new Latin America with more health, education, justice for the poor and culture."

== Exhibitions ==
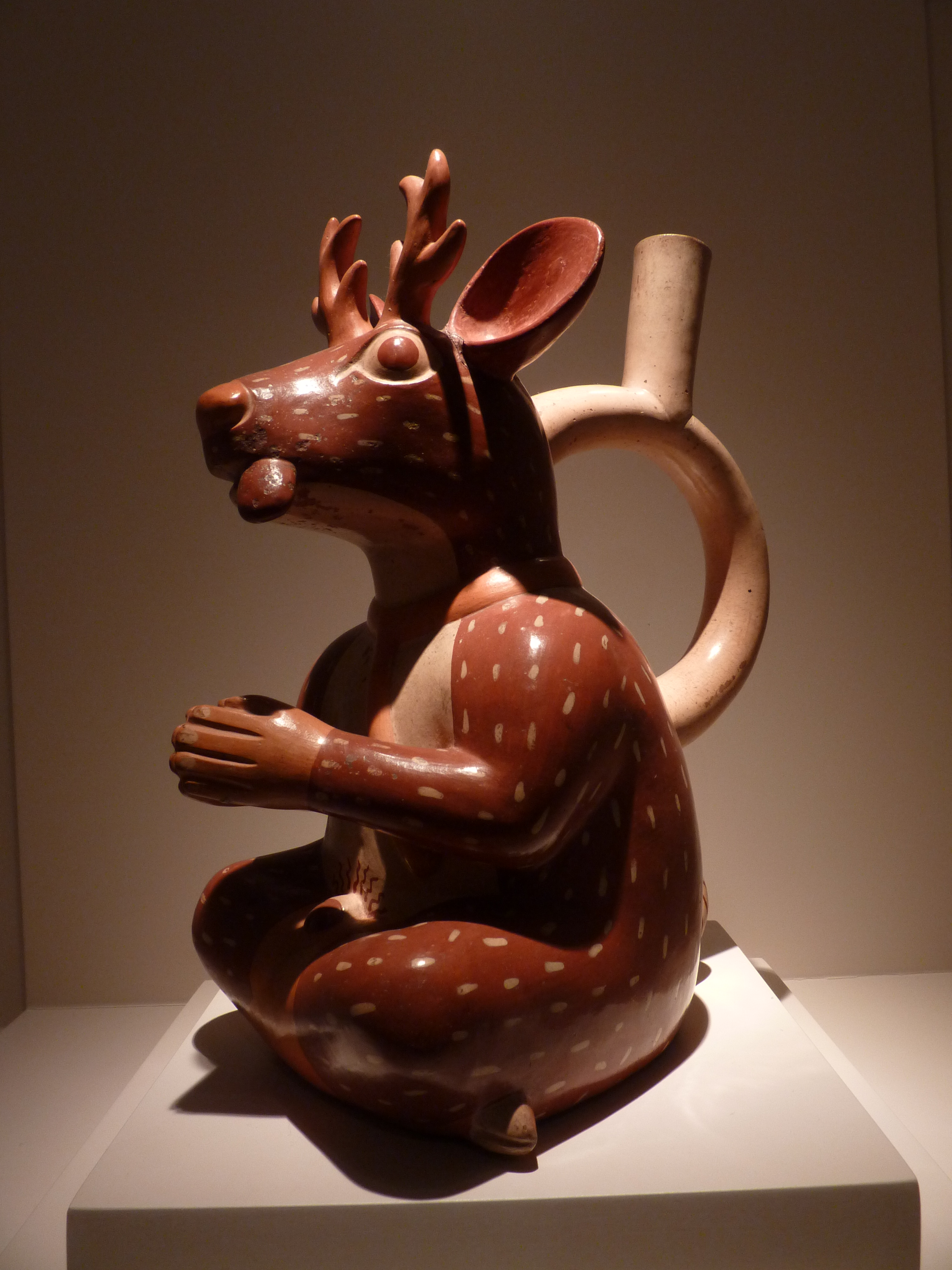
Ceramic vessel from the Museum

The works of art displayed at the museum, encompass a period of time ranging between 1250 BC and AD 1532. There are a total of ten galleries: Formative, Nasca, Mochica, Huari, Chancay – Chimu, Inca, Wood, Jewelry and Stone, Silver, and Gold and Metals.

The Formative Gallery houses pieces from many diverse cultures. Among these are Cupisnique, Salinar, Vicus, Viru and Paracas in its older phase or “cavernas”. During this period (1250 B. C - 1 A. D.) there is a remarkable advance in ceramic art. Painting and sculpture take in place; there are beautifully naturalistic and symbolic representations; many of them enriched by the use of incise decoration in which the Cupisnique artist get to a high development.

The Inca culture conquered all the territory of pre-Columbian Peru where they restored with great political ability the Tahuantinsuyo empire. In the Inca Gallery magnificent ceramic objects are showcased like the emblematic aribalos or monumental vessels. These pieces have many decorative elements that transmit a subtle message of organization and symbolism. One of these aribalos is of great size and is unique to the collection.

== Other points of interest ==
The Museum's Auditorium seats 120 people and often houses lectures and other local events.
