= RATP Smart Systems =

French ticketing and passenger information systems company

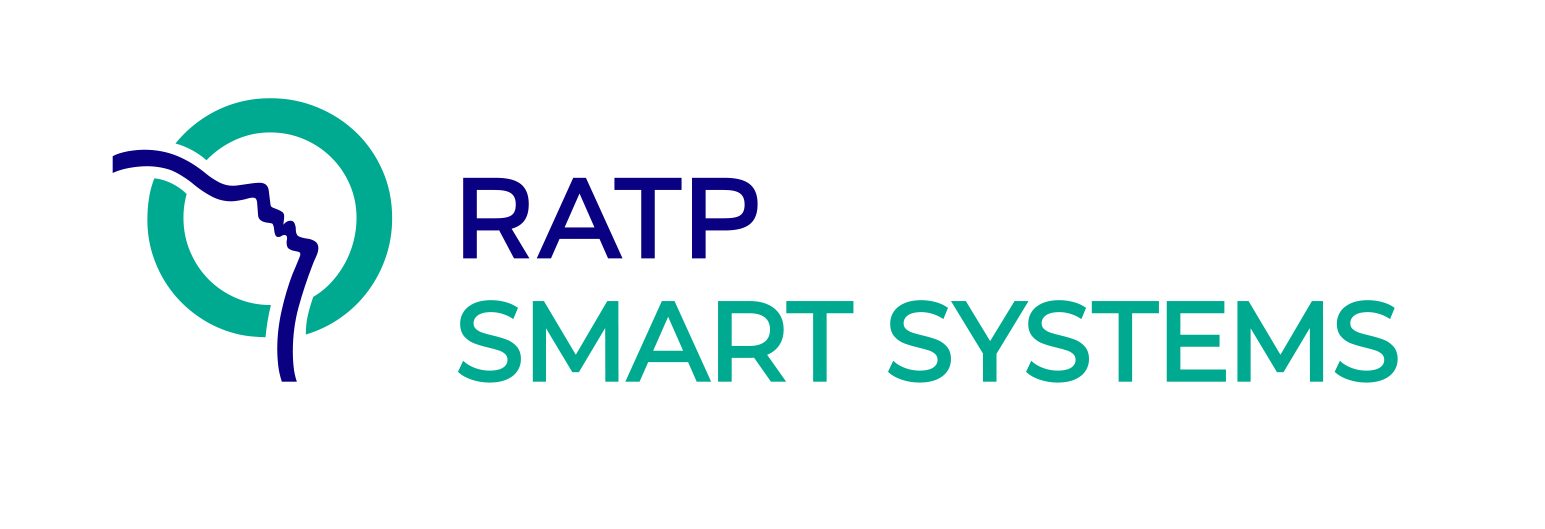
- Type: SAS
- Industry: Public transport
- Founded: February 2010
- Headquarters: Noisy-le-Grand, France
- Area served: Worldwide, with significant activities in France
- Products: Ticketing and passenger information systems
- Number of employees: 200
- Parent: RATP Group
- Website: www.ratpsmartsystems.com

RATP Smart Systems, is a French company specializing in ticketing and passenger information systems. The company provides these with focus on new technology such as mobile phones, smartcards and the Internet. It is a subsidiary of RATP Group.

== History ==
The company was founded in February 2010 as part of an initiative to promote the RATP Group's activities outside of Paris.

== Expertise ==
=== Passenger information ===
Public transport users are demanding an individualised travel experience. They want responsive services to make their journey easier. Nowadays, passenger expectations are to

- Get information to prepare and optimise their journey
- Look up traffic conditions in real time
- Be warned of incidents and be given alternative solutions

=== Ticketing services ===
Ticketing covers all activities involved in ticket sales, validation and inspection (as well as fare collection and control).

=== Mappy web mapping ===
RATP Smart Systems is also the proprietor of the Mappy web mapping service, founded as a Minitel mapping service in 1987.

== Locations ==
RATP Smart Systems refers to a presence in 10 countries and lists reference projects in 11 countries: Algeria, Saudi Arabia, Colombia, France, Chile, United Kingdom, Ivory Coast, Ecuador, India, Mexico and the Dominican Republic.
