= Multi-spacecraft Autonomous Positioning System =

Navigation software by NASA

Multi-spacecraft Autonomous Positioning System (MAPS) is networked computer navigation software, Developed by Anzalone and researchers at NASA Marshall Space Flight Center. MAPS was successfully tested on the International Space Station in 2018 using NASA's Space Communications and Navigation testbed.

In February 2024, the Lunar Node-1 experiment, a radio beacon, should land on the lunar surface in the payloads on the CLPS Nova-1 lander.

== Description ==
The system embeds navigation and state information, such as timing, position, and velocity as well as estimated accuracy, into data packets being transmitted by spacecraft and ground stations as part of their digital communications. Using its local clock, a spacecraft can estimate its range from various data transmitters, and then estimate its own location.

This network is already being implemented and routinely used in Martian communications through the use of the Mars Reconnaissance Orbiter and Mars Odyssey spacecraft
