= Vicús culture =

Culture of Peru

Vicús
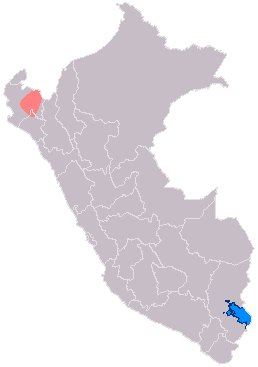
- Map of the Vicús culture in Northern Peru
- Period: Early Intermediate
- Dates: c. 200 BCE - 600 CE
- Major sites: Cerro Vicús
- Preceded by: Chavín
- Followed by: Tallán, Wari

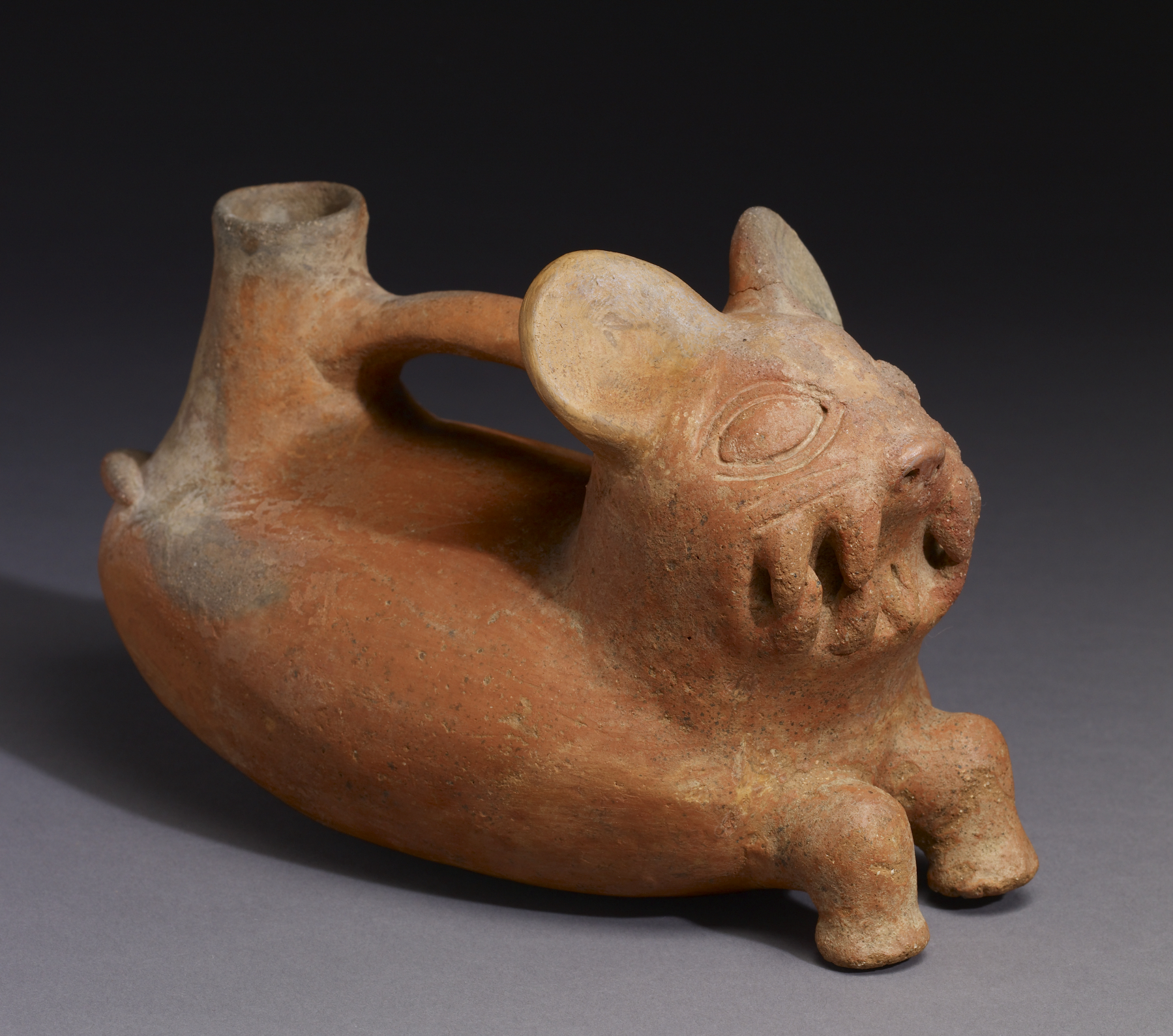
Vicús Feline Vessel from Walters Art Museum

Vicús culture was an important early culture in Peru from 1000/200 BCE to 300/600 CE. They lived in the Piura region in the northern Pacific coast of Peru. Its administrative headquarters, located in the "Cerro Vicús", at an altitude of 170 meters above sea level, and which gives its name to this culture, served as a link with other Andean cities located further north.

The most important feature of this culture is agriculture, the basis for their economic development. It is known that they cultivated squash or mate, corn and some fruits, with advanced irrigation systems. These activities were complemented by livestock or hunting. The vicus, connoisseurs of the alloys of silver, gold and copper, even used these metals in the elaboration of their farming instruments.

The main instrument of control and social exploitation, backed by fierce militarism, was a strong contingent of noble warriors that scoured the domain to enforce the sovereign's mandates.

Their culture developed in three major stages:

- Chavín Stage;
- Regional development stage;
- Mochica stage of influence.

== Art ==
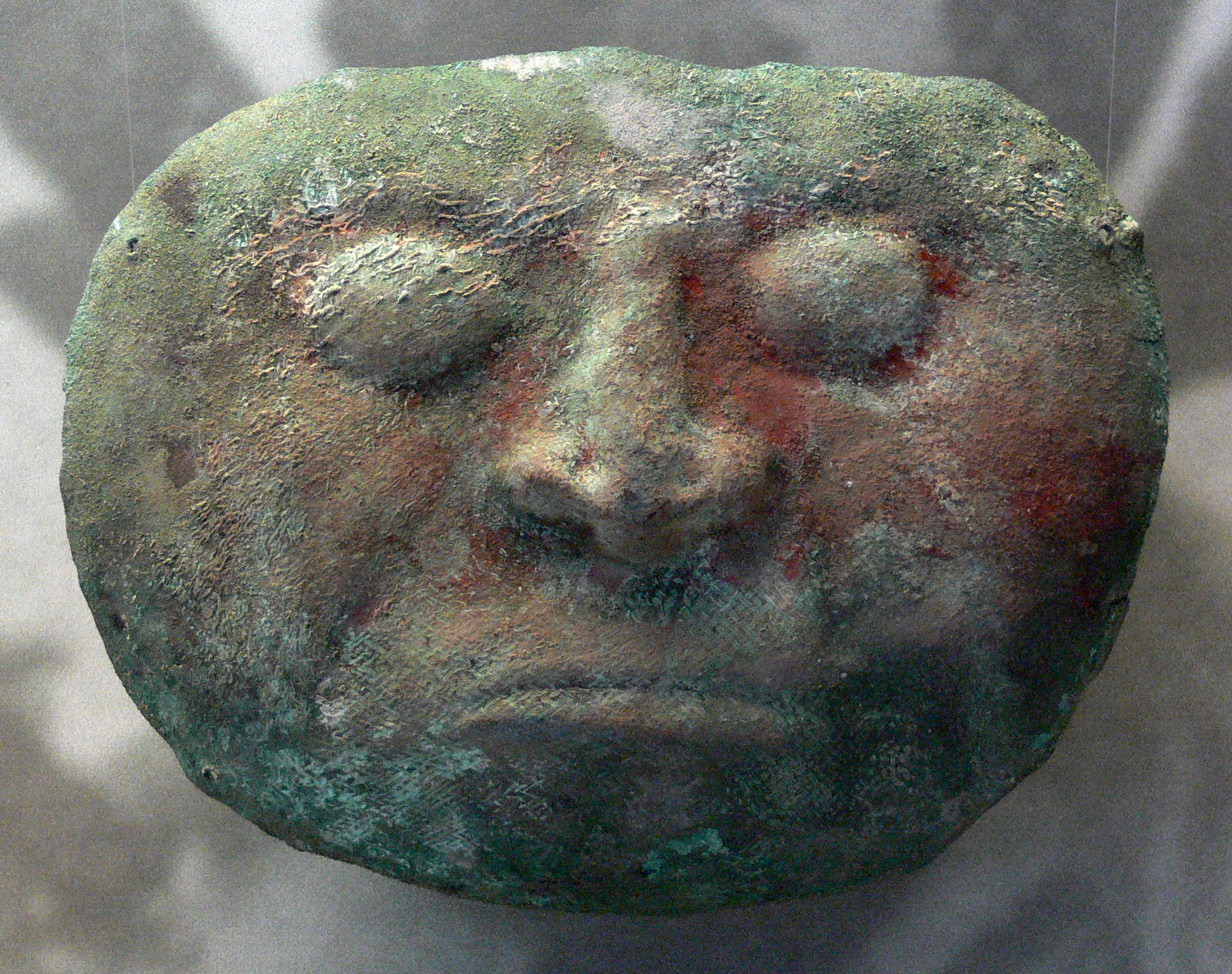
Vicus copper mask with red paint; 500 BC-400 AD, Kloster Allerheiligen, Schaffhausen, Switzerland

They were known for their work in ceramics, copper, and gold. Living mainly on the coastal deserts, they used the native clay and local dyes to produce natural and religious symbols; modern day pottery from the town of Chulucanas is said to closely resemble the ancient art. They created Double spout and bridge vessel that created whistling sounds when pouring liquids.

== See also ==
- Moche culture
