= Teku-Teku Mappy =

2003 video game

- Developer(s): Namco
- Publisher(s): Namco
- Series: Mappy
- Platform(s): Mobile phone
- Release: February 14, 2003
- Genre(s): Puzzle
- Mode(s): Single-player

Teku-Teku Mappy (テクテクマッピー) is a puzzle mobile game featuring the police mouse, Mappy. It was released and published by Namco on February 14, 2003 in Japan.
