= Owen Mapp =

New Zealand carver (born 1945)

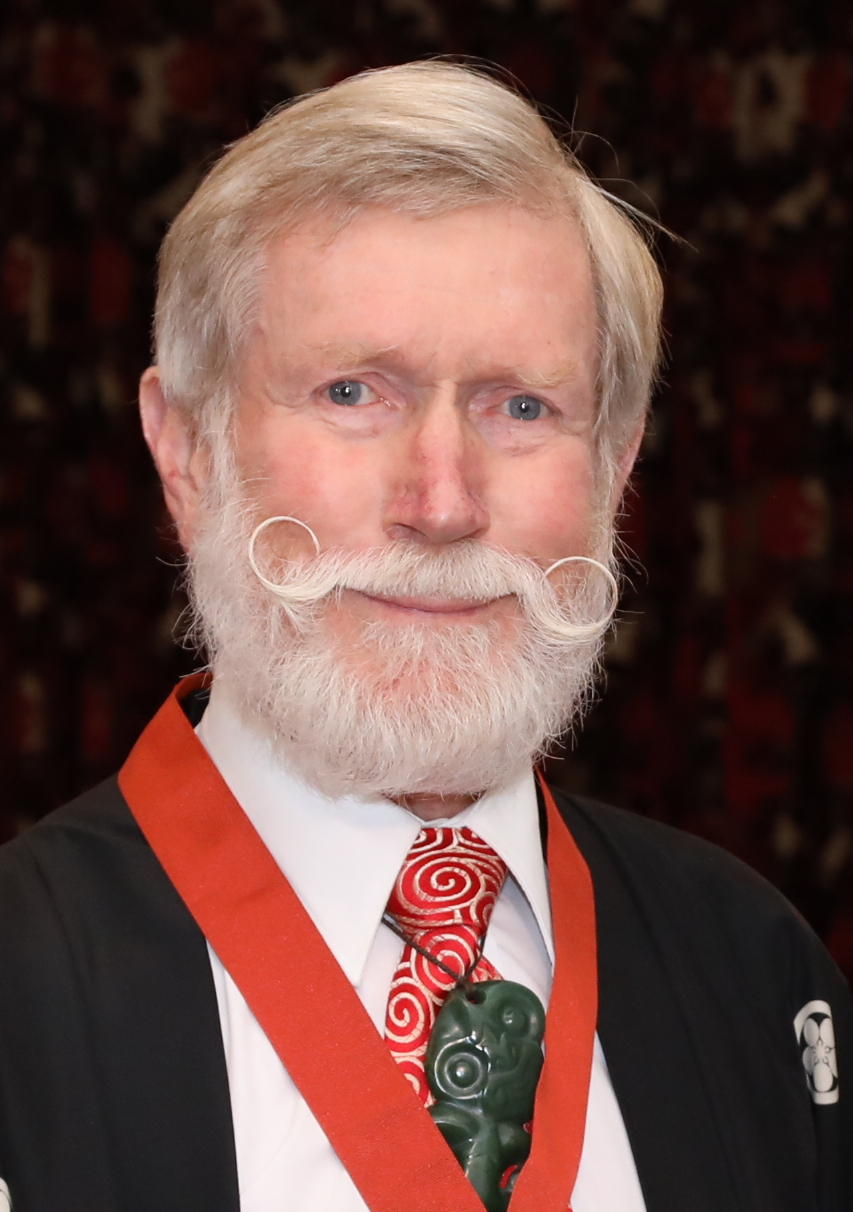
Mapp in 2019

Owen Thomas Mapp CNZM (born 1945) is a New Zealand carver who works primarily in bone.

== Biography ==
Born on a farm outside Blenheim in 1945, Mapp was educated at Nelson College from 1960 to 1963. He started working in museums while at high school and developed a strong interest in archaeology. He also worked early in his career as a designer for film and television.

Mapp began carving with whale ivory, whale bone and cow bone in 1969. He became the first contemporary professional bone carver in New Zealand. His first exhibition was at Wellington's Bett-Duncan Gallery in 1972. At this time he also became involved with the New Zealand chapter of the World Craft Council (later the Craft Council of New Zealand) and the New Zealand Academy of Fine Arts which helped him promote his work and through which he also organised workshops to demonstrate bone carving.

In 1990, he received a QEII Arts Council (now Creative New Zealand) study grant and established a connection with Japanese netsuke carvers. He continues to exhibit in Japan and his work has been acquired by the Japanese royal family. Mapp tutors at Whitireia New Zealand in the Visual Arts and Design programme.

In his survey of three-dimensional arts in New Zealand in 1980, Peter Cape wrote, 'Mapp prefers to think of the items he carves in bone and ivory as handpieces or, as he says, 'three-dimensional sculptures to be worn on the body or carried in the pocket, to be held, fondled, and not just looked art'.'

== Personal life ==
Mapp has two daughters with his ex-wife, New Zealand potter Anneke Borren.

Mapp is based in Wellington with his wife and fellow artist Hanne Eriksen-Mapp.
