= Huaco (pottery) =

Precolumbian pottery

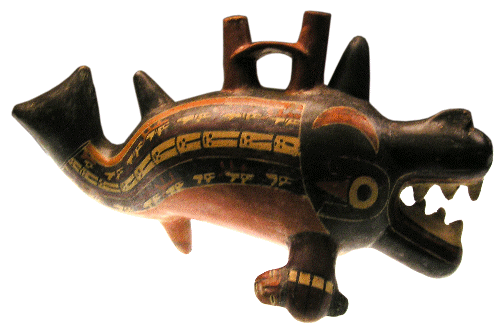
Nazca culture huaco, double spout and bridge vessel representing an orca.

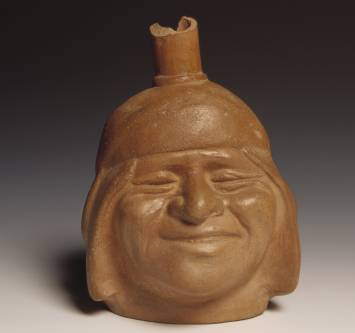
Moche Portrait pot. This fine pot appears to represent a good-humored Moche man.

Huaco or Guaco is the generic name given in Peru mostly to earthen vessels and other finely made pottery artworks by the indigenous peoples of the Americas found in pre-Columbian sites such as burial locations, sanctuaries, temples and other ancient ruins. Huacos are not mere earthenware but notable pottery specimens linked to ceremonial, religious, artistic or aesthetic uses in central Andean, pre-Columbian civilizations.

The Huari (Wari), along with the Nazca, the Moche and others, were among the major creators of figurines who passed down through history their unique skills in ceramics. The Incas, who absorbed all the cultures in the time of its expansion, also produced huacos.

== Etymology ==
Since the time of the Spanish conquest of Peru, these types of pieces have been found in pre-Columbian sites like temples, graves and burials, as well as other kinds of ruins. These sites, especially those of sacred meaning, are called huaca or waqa in Quechua, from which the figurines likely derive their name. In Peru, a "huaquero" is someone who illegally excavates ancient pre-Columbian ruins to obtain valuable works of art, usually destroying the structure in the process.

== Variety of styles and colors ==
The bridge handles are characteristic of some cultures; some used many colors, while others used black and dull red or few colors. Inca Empire adopted all sorts of shapes, styles and qualities. The term "huaco" was reserved for any copies not reserved for daily use but for luxury or ritual.

Normally these ceramic pieces are associated with notable features. Sculptured figurines depict complex, stylized volumes, including cultural scenes, buildings, and naturalistic volumes such as portrait ceramics representing human faces (for example, the Moche Portrait Ceramic) or body parts by way of votive offering, erotica, tools, various fruits and foods, animals, etc.

When the pieces are sculptural ceramics, huacos are characterized by pictorial richness. There are many kinds of pots and containers covered with gaudy polychrome motifs, usually anthropomorphic representations of animals or mythological, erotica, etc. Two-toned Moche pottery is characterized by complex painted scenes detailing a narrative level. Examples of erotic huacos (Spanish: huacos eróticos), make the Moche's 800-year period (c. 200 BC to c. 600 AD) the longest unbroken erotic ceramics tradition in the world, unique in the history of mankind. In the 1570s during the Spanish conquest of Peru, Viceroy Francisco de Toledo and his clerical advisers worked to destroy many erotic huacos, though some extant artifacts have survived.

In both cases the huaco is associated with ceramic complexity (in its volume or decoration) and not with regular use as a container on account of its physical dimensions. The slender Incan vessels known as aryballos, even opulently created examples, are not usually considered huacos since their utilitarian character is too pronounced.

== Museum exhibits ==
The National Museum of the Archaeology, Anthropology, and History of Peru in Lima, Peru houses a large number of ceramic artifacts. The nearby Larco Museum houses a large collection of Moche ceramics and is well known for its collection of erotic pottery.

== See also ==
- Moche portrait vessel
