= Mapping theorem (point process) =

The mapping theorem is a theorem in the theory of point processes, a sub-discipline of probability theory. It describes how a Poisson point process is altered under measurable transformations. This allows construction of more complex Poisson point processes out of homogeneous Poisson point processes and can, for example, be used to simulate these more complex Poisson point processes in a similar manner to inverse transform sampling.

== Statement ==
Let $X,Y$ be locally compact and polish and let

$$f \colon X \to Y$$

be a measurable function. Let $\mu$ be a Radon measure on $X$ and assume that the pushforward measure

$$\nu:= \mu \circ f^{-1}$$

of $\mu$ under the function $f$ is a Radon measure on $Y$.

Then the following holds: If $\xi$ is a Poisson point process on $X$ with intensity measure $\mu$, then $\xi \circ f^{-1}$ is a Poisson point process on $Y$ with intensity measure $\nu:= \mu \circ f^{-1}$.
