= Double spout and bridge vessel =

Double spout: Peruvian vessel

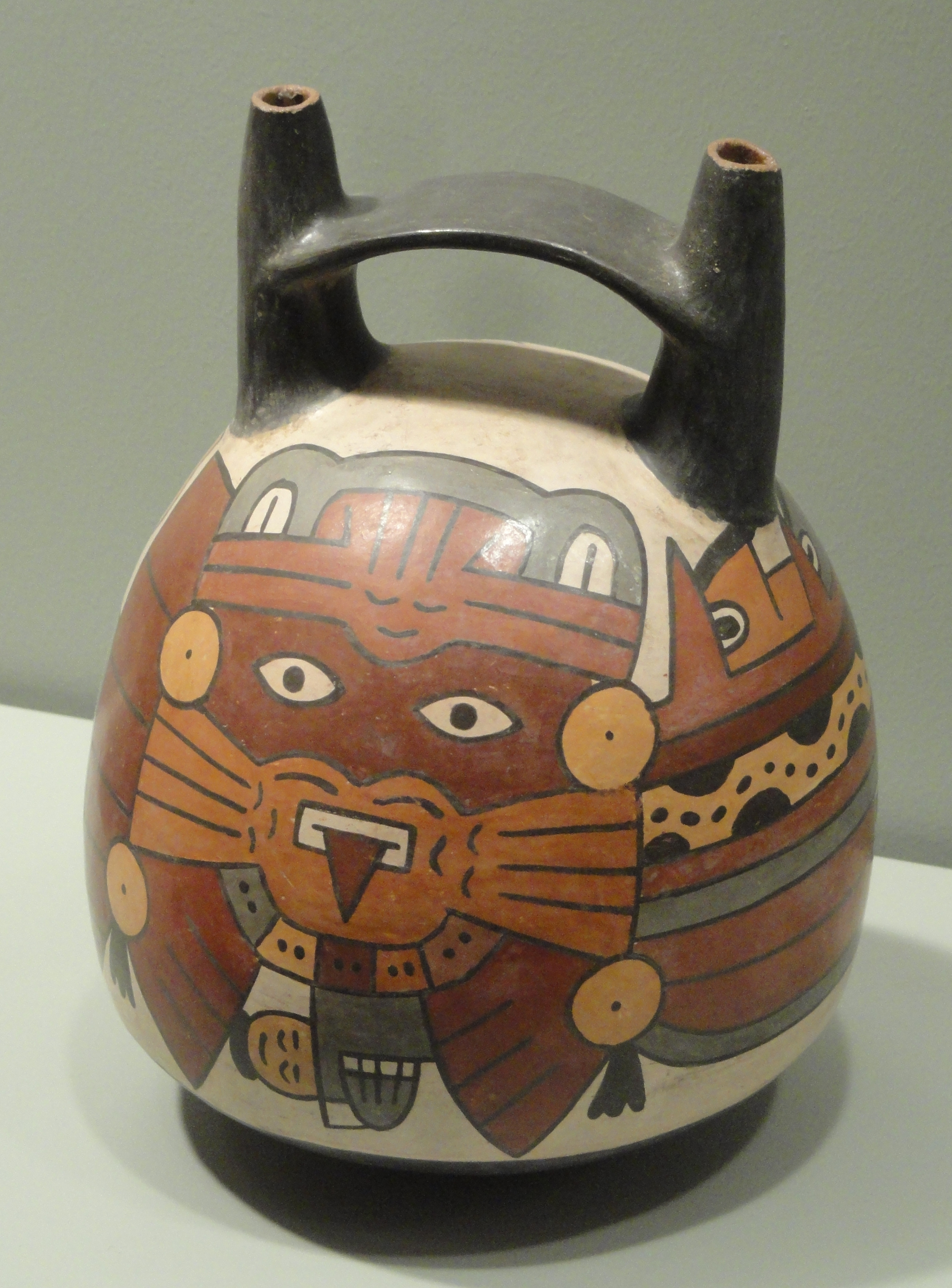
A bridge-spouted bottle from the Nasca culture, 100-300 AD

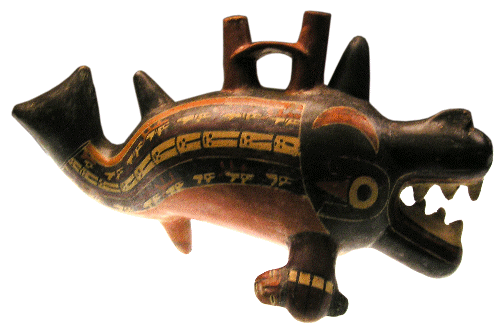
Huaco figurative vessel of this form

The double spout and bridge vessel was a form of usually ceramic drinking container developed sometime before 500 BC by indigenous groups on the Peruvian coast. True to its name, this type of bottle is distinguished by two spouts with a handle bridging them. First used by the Paracas culture, it was later adopted by the Nazca. While at first the Paracas tended to incise designs derived from the art of the Chavin culture on the surface of the vessels, later on they began to treat the vessel as a sculptural form, an advance facilitated by developments in ceramic technology that allowed them construct vessels with thinner walls. This tradition was continued by the Nazca, whose vessels were elaborately figurative (see illustration below right), decorated with polychrome glazes, or both.

The vessels were constructed by the coil method. The Nazca would then apply multicolored slip to achieve polychrome effects before the vessels were fired, an advance over the Paracas, who had painted the vessels with resins after firing. The Nazca technique allowed for much brighter and more permanent colors, whose sheen was enhanced by burnishing after the vessel was fired.

Both the Paracas and the Nazca appear to have used this type of vessel for ritual purposes, as they are most often found in graves.

== See also ==
- Stirrup spout vessel
- Bridge spouted vessel, a similarly named but unrelated Mediterranean vessel form
