= Larco Museum =

Archeological museum in Lima, Peru

Rafael Larco Herrera Archaeological Museum Larco Museum
- Museo Arqueológico Rafael Larco Herrera Museo Larco
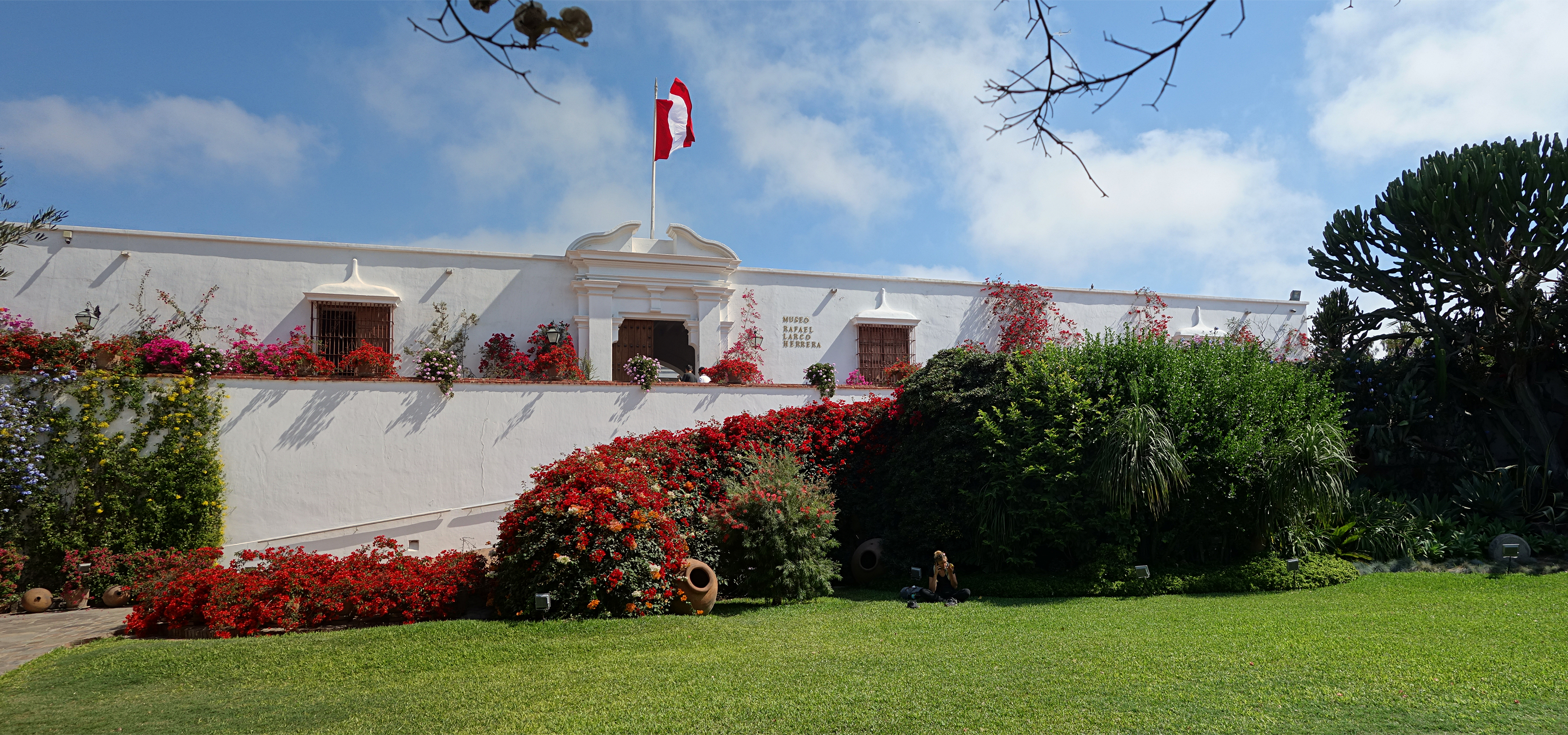
- Entrance to the museum
- Interactive fullscreen map
- Established: July 28, 1926
- Location: Av. Bolivar 1515; Pueblo Libre; Lima, Peru
- Coordinates: 12°04′21″S 77°04′15″W
- Type: Archaeological museum
- Director: Andrés Álvarez Calderón
- Website: www.museolarco.org

The Larco Museum (officially known as Rafael Larco Herrera Archaeological Museum, in Spanish: Museo Arqueológico Rafael Larco Herrera) is a privately owned museum of pre-Columbian art, located in the Pueblo Libre district of Lima, Peru. The museum is housed in an 18th-century vice-royal building. It showcases chronological galleries that provide a thorough overview of 5,000 years of Peruvian pre-Columbian history. It is well known for its gallery of pre-Columbian erotic pottery.

== History ==
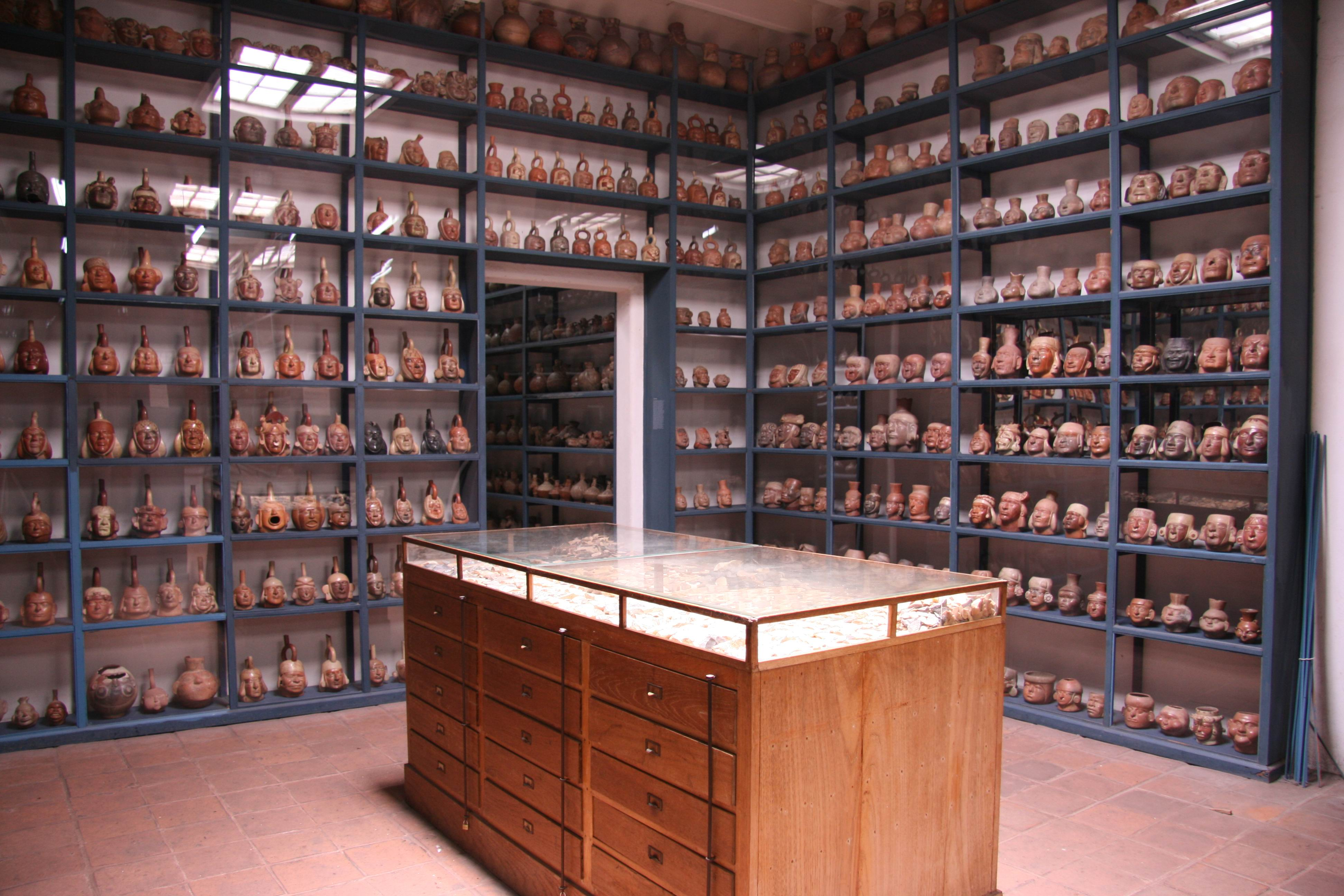
Storage Gallery

In 1925, Rafael Larco Herrera acquired a collection of vases and other archaeological pieces from his brother-in-law, Alfredo Hoyle. There were approximately 600 ceramic pieces in all. The arrival of these objects ignited a collector's enthusiasm in his son, Rafael Larco Hoyle. Soon after, Larco Herrera left his son in charge of the collection and those pieces completed the first collection of what would become the Rafael Larco Herrera Museum.

During that same year, Larco Hoyle received some advice from his uncle, Victor Larco Herrera, a founder of the first museum in Lima. He urged Larco Hoyle to form a new museum in Lima, one that could guard all the archaeological relics that were continually being extracted by clandestine excavators.

Larco Hoyle agreed with his uncle and proceeded to create a museum that would carry on his father's legacy. Larco Hoyle purchased two large collections: 8,000 pieces from Roa and 6,000 pieces from Carranza. He also purchased several small collections in Chicama Valley, Trujillo, Virú, and Chimbote. Within a year, the collection had grown significantly and display cases were installed in a small house on the Chiclín estate. On July 28, 1926, Independence Day, the museum opened to the public as Museo Arqueológico Rafael Larco Herrera.

The Larco Museum now lends some of its collection to its daughter museum, the Museo de Arte Precolombino (Pre-Columbian Art Museum), located in Cusco, Peru.

== Exhibitions ==
=== Permanent exhibits ===
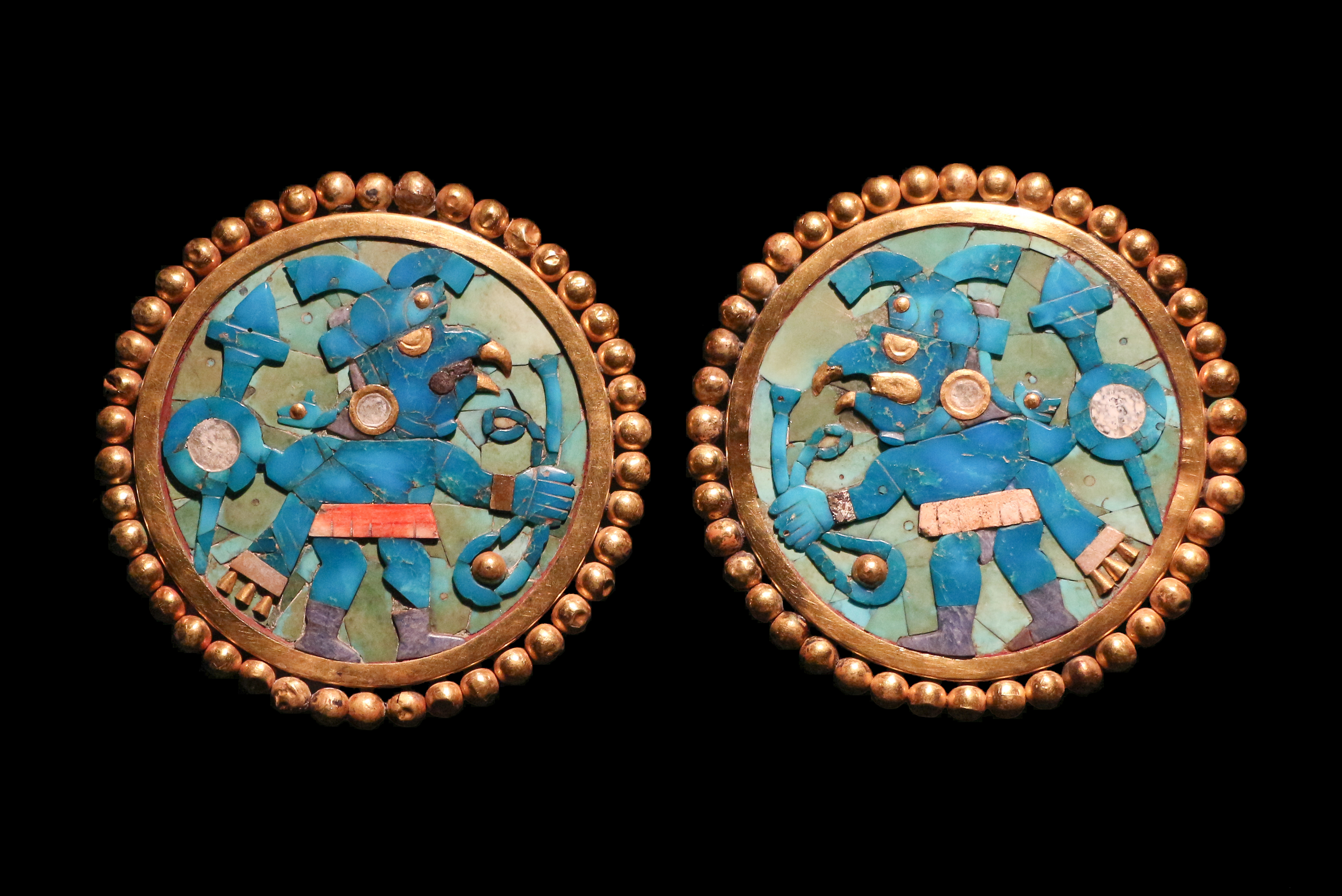
Moche earrings

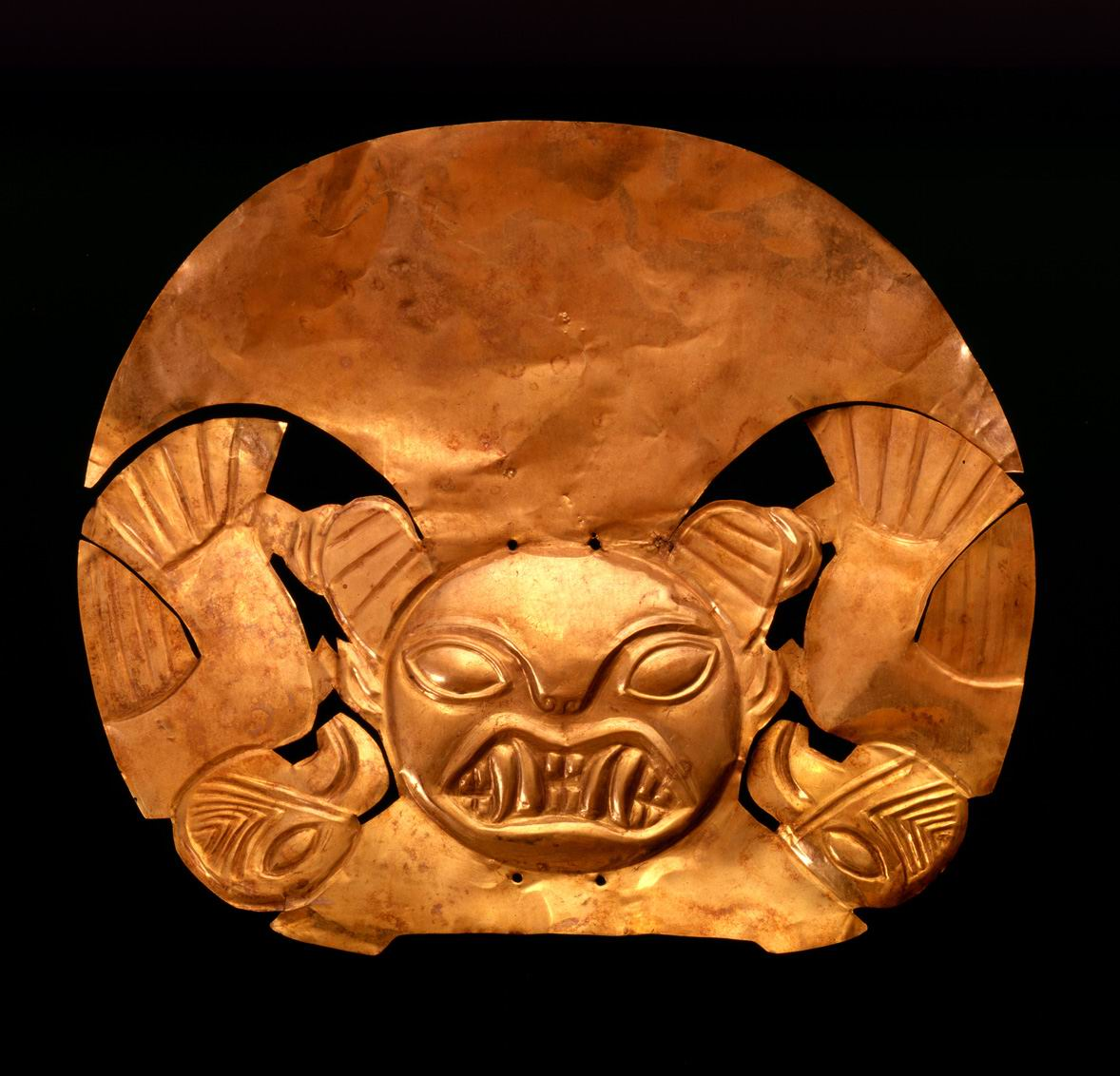
Mochica Headdress from the Gold and Silver Gallery

The museum has several permanent exhibitions. The Gold and Silver Gallery showcases the largest collection of jewelry used by many notable rulers of pre-Columbian Peru. It comprises a collection of crowns, earrings, nose ornaments, garments, masks and vases, finely wrought in gold and decorated with semi-precious stones. Ancient Peruvian cultures represented their daily lives in ceramics, and this gallery holds the world's largest collection of erotic ceramics.

The Cultures Gallery exhibits 10,000 years of Peruvian pre-Columbian history. This chronology-based gallery provides visitors with a comprehensive view of cultures that existed in pre-Columbian Peru through the extant indigenous art that has survived since the 16th century Spanish conquest. This hall is divided into four areas: North Coast, Center, South and cultures from the highlands. Showcases have been ordered according to cultural sequence:

- From the North Coast: Cupisnique, Vicus, Mochica and Chimu;
- From the Central Coast: Lima and Chancay;
- From the South Coast: Paracas, Nazca and Chincha;
- From the Highlands: Chavín, Tiahuanaco, Huari and Inca.

Other galleries include the Lithic, Vault, Ceramics, Metals, Textiles and Storage in which visitors have the opportunity to view the museum's entire collection of classified archaeological objects.

=== International exhibits ===
In addition to its permanent exhibits, the museum lends its collections to several museums and cultural centers around the world.

=== Gallery of pre-Columbian Erotic Pottery ===
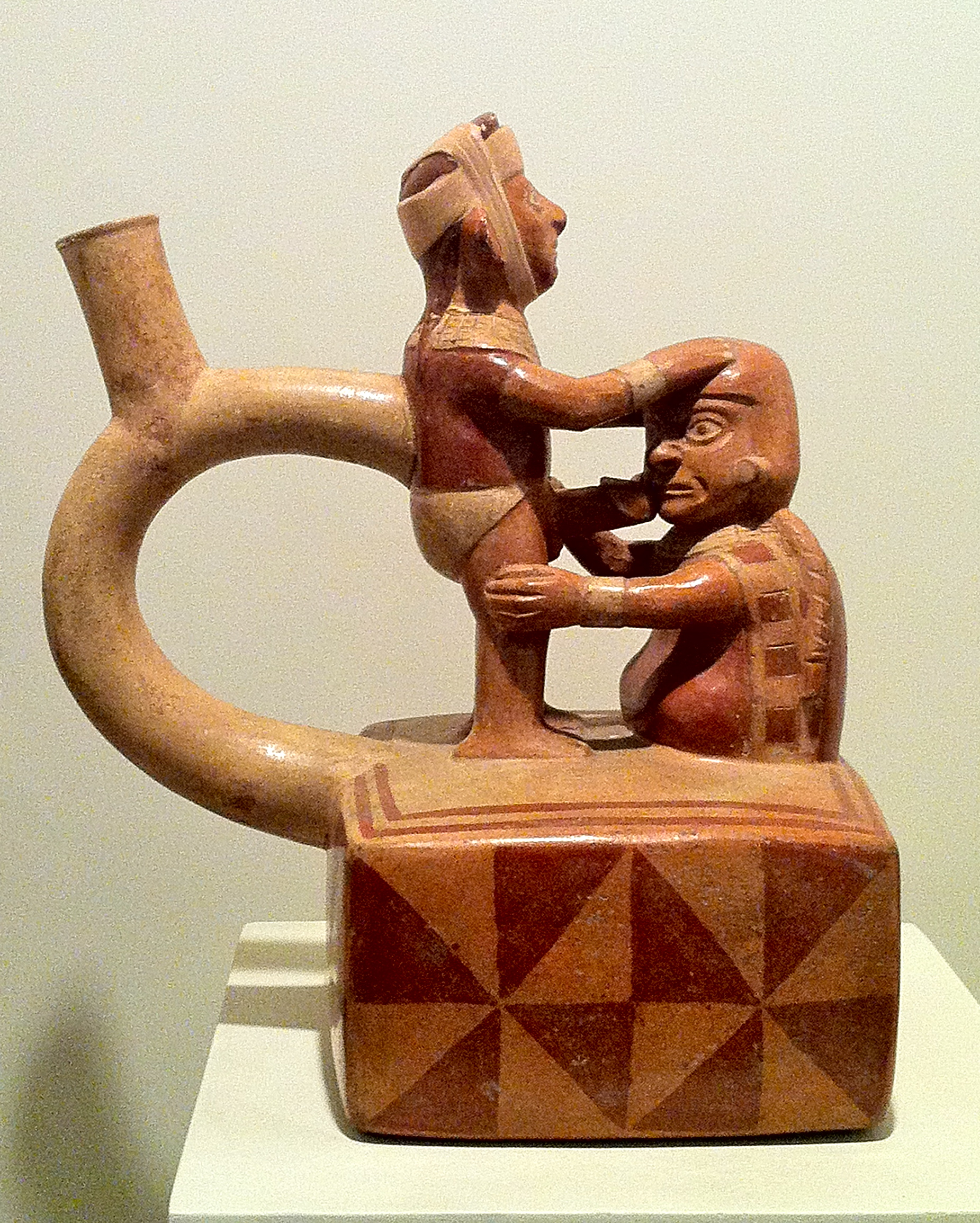
Pre-Columbian Huaco Pottery depicting fellatio.

This hall displays the selection of archaeological objects found by Rafael Larco Hoyle in the 1960s, as a result of his research on sexual representations in Peruvian pre-Columbian art, published in his book "Checan" (1966).

== Other points of interest ==
The Museum Gallery Shop has a wide variety of ceramic, metal and textile reproductions made by skilled craftsmen from all over Peru. The museum has formalized the reproduction techniques for these pre-Columbian artifacts and assesses each piece to ensure quality.

== Gallery ==
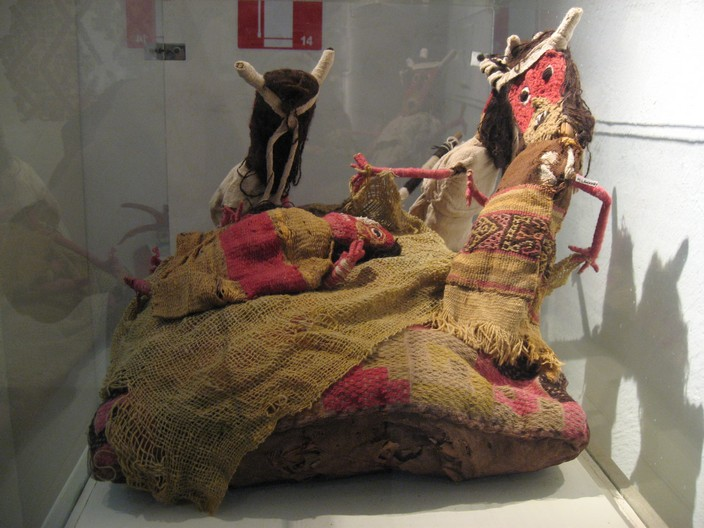

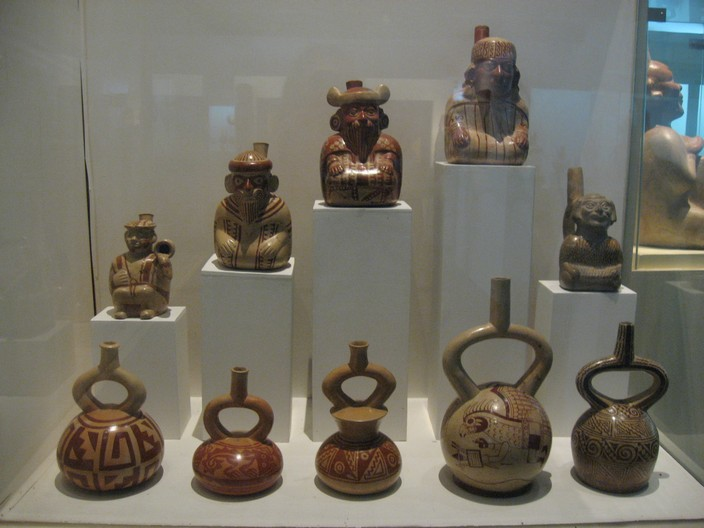

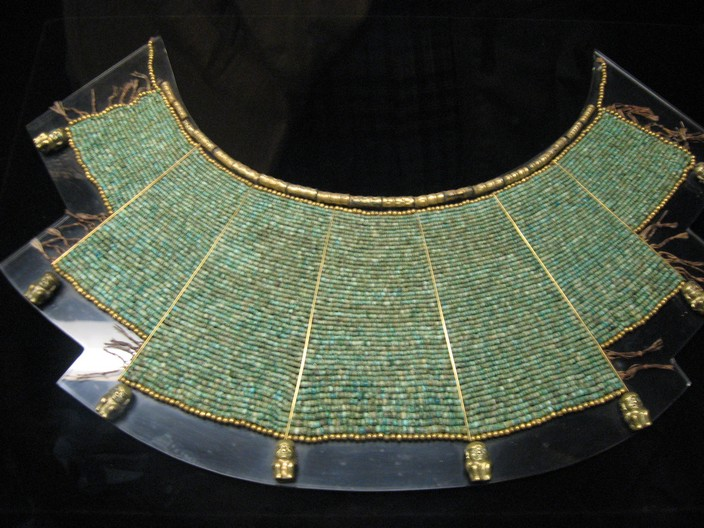

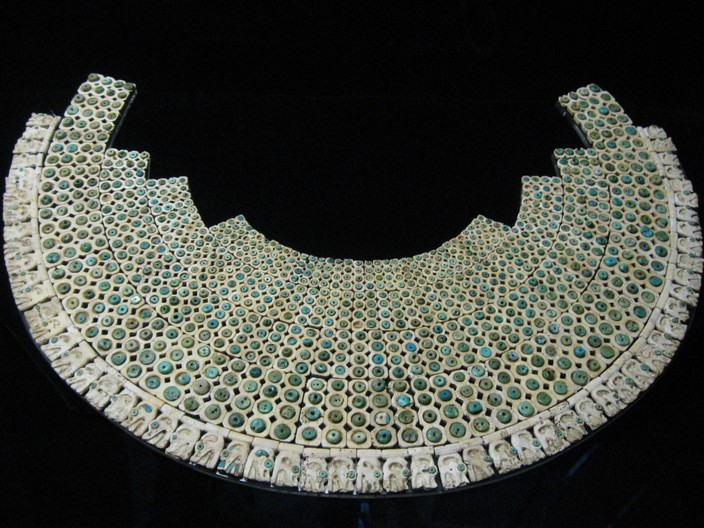

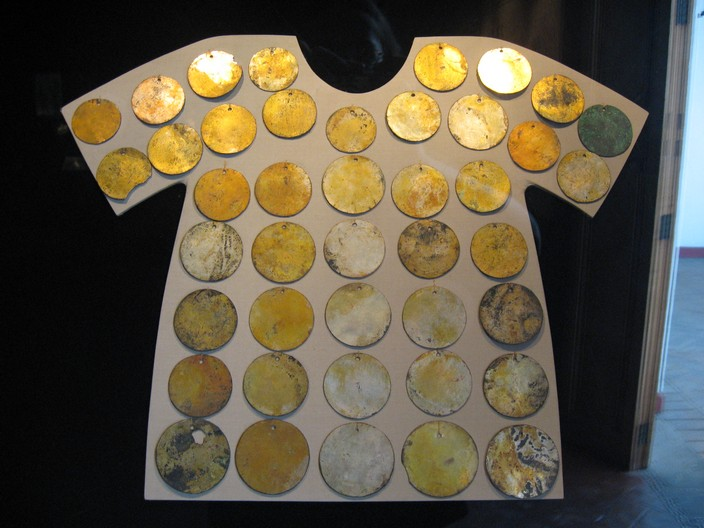

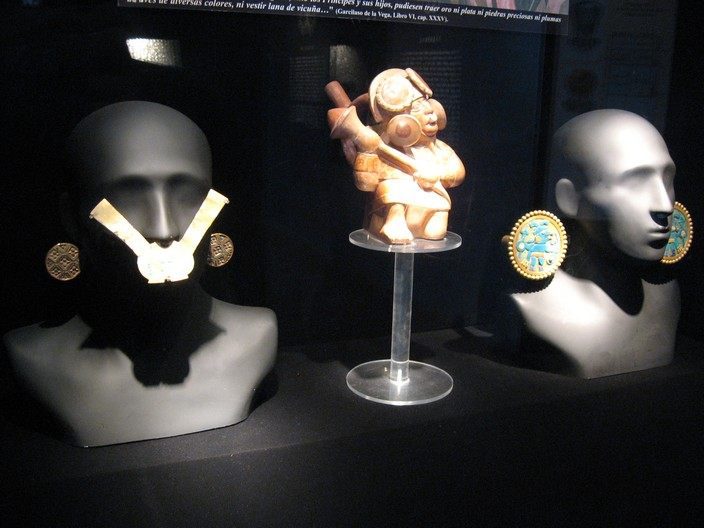

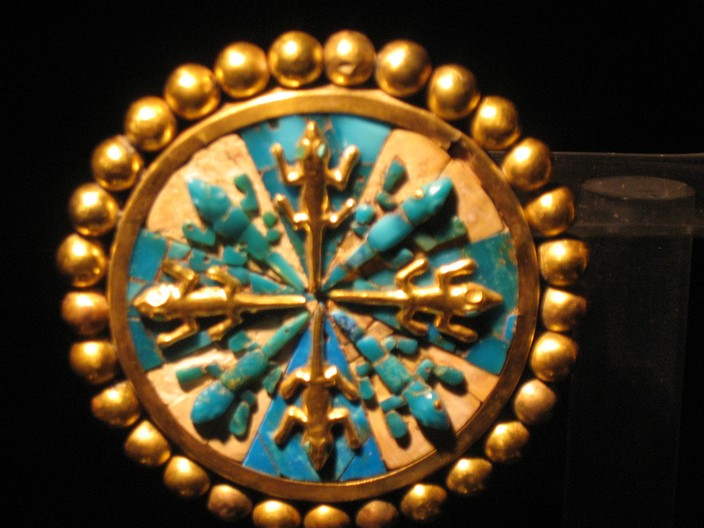

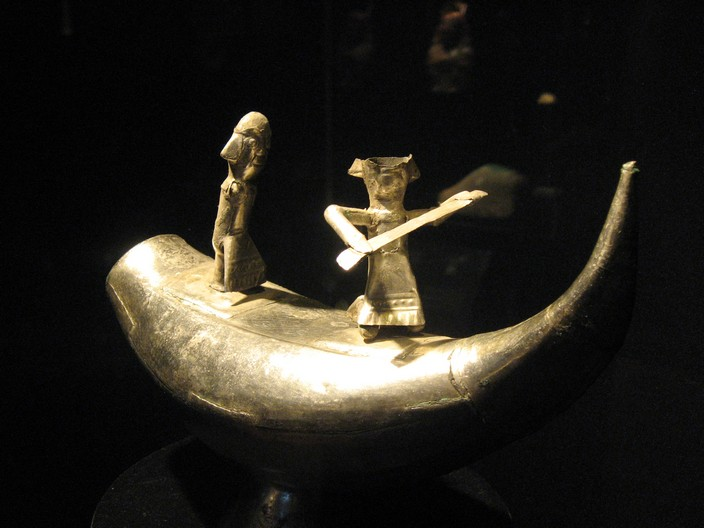

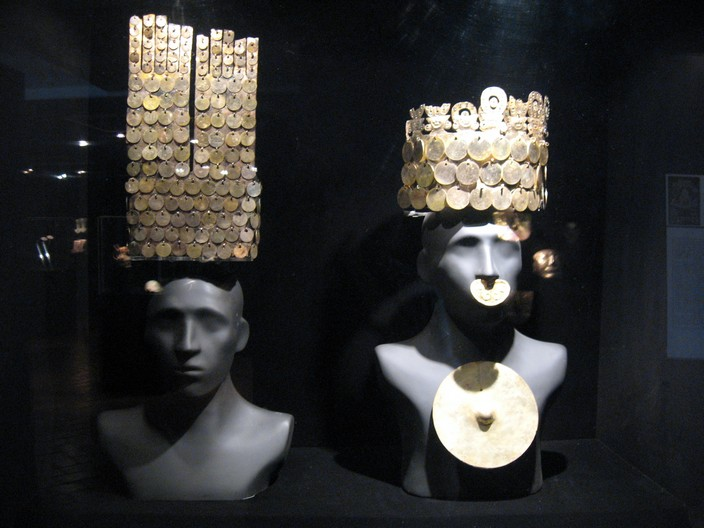

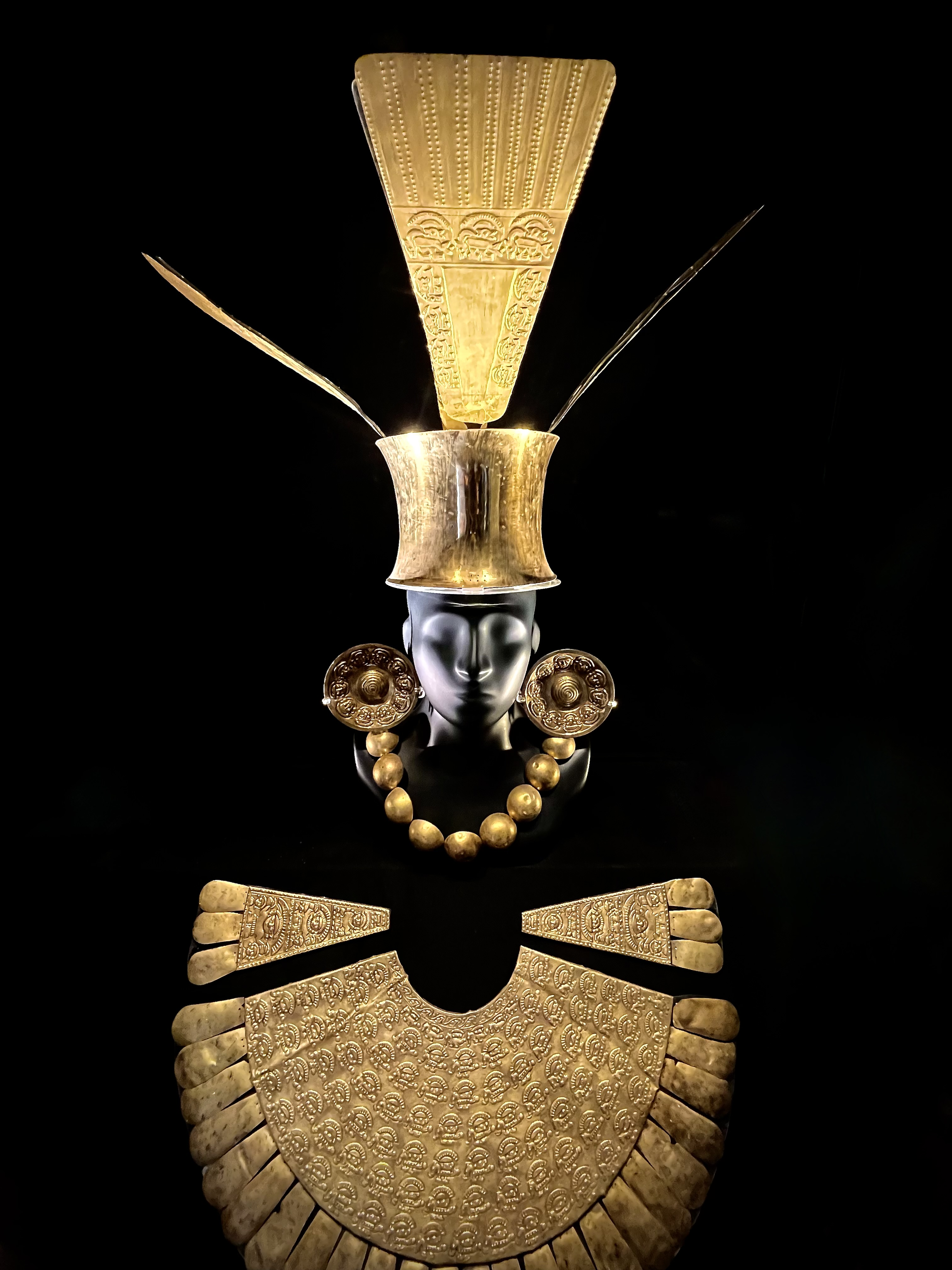

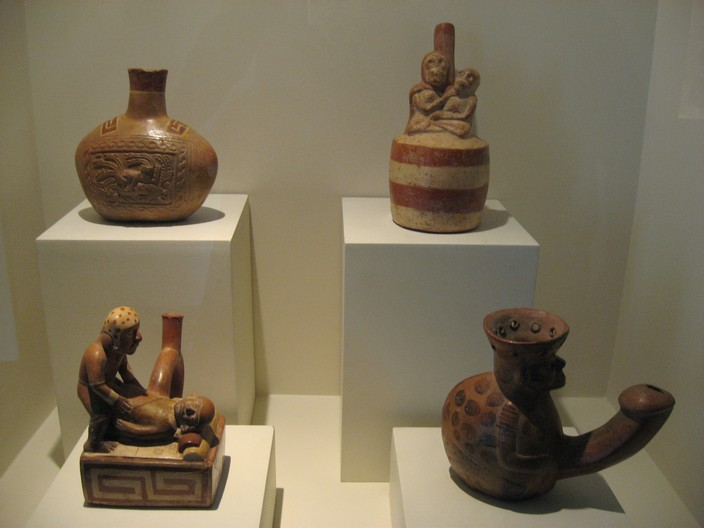
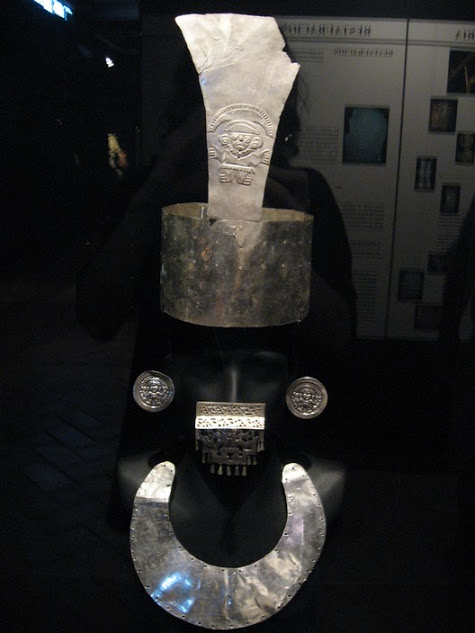

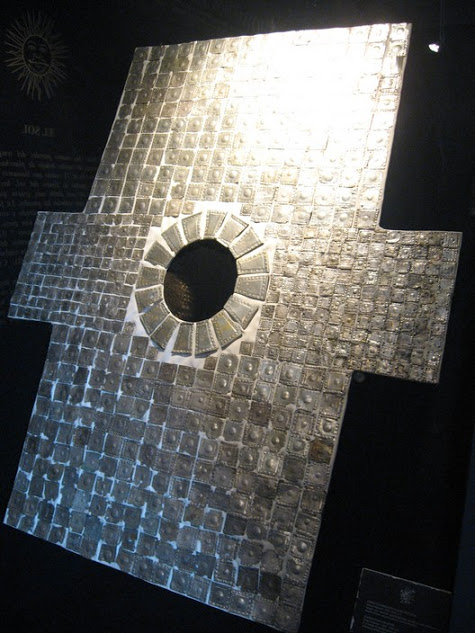

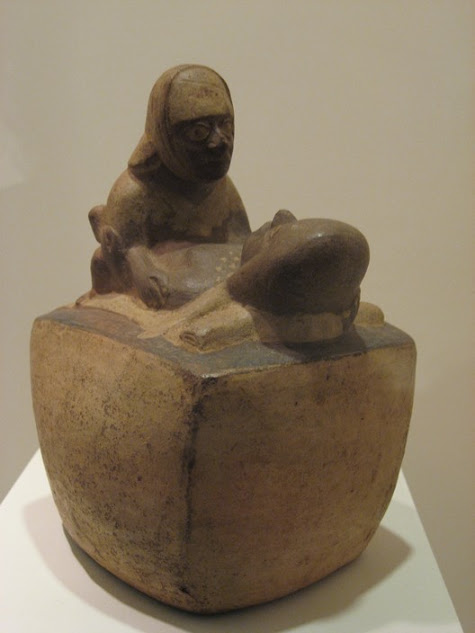

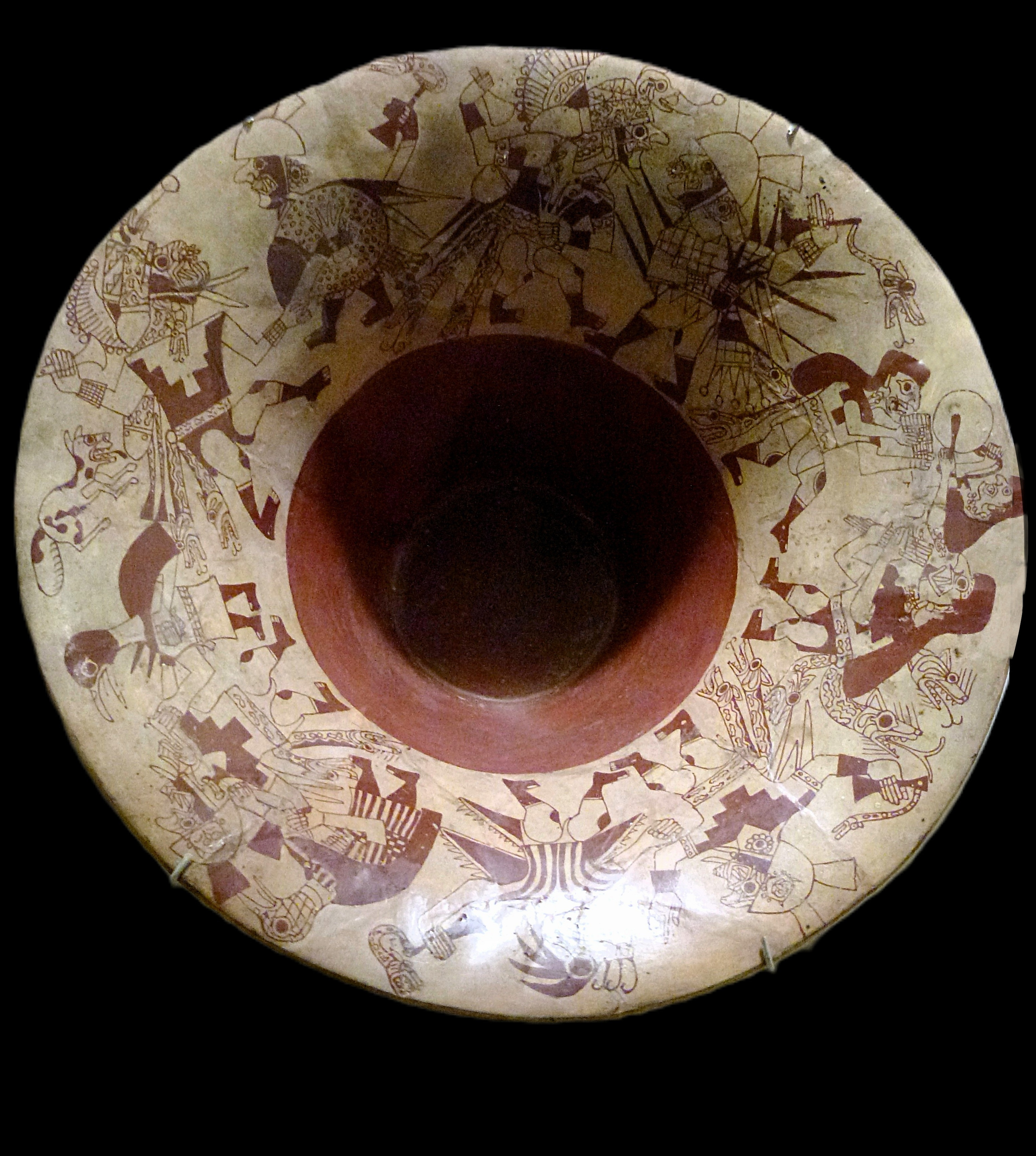
Ceramic jug with flared rim showing episodes from the mythological epic of Aiapaec
