= Pre-Columbian Peru =

Historical region in South America

Peruvian territory was inhabited 14,000 years ago by hunters and gatherers. Subsequent developments include the appearance of sedentary communities that developed agriculture and irrigation, and the emergence of complex socio-political hierarchies that created sophisticated civilizations, technology and monumental construction.

== Andean cultural formations ==
- According to some, lithics found in the caves of Pikimachay, Chivateros, Lauricocha, Paiján, and Toquepala provide the evidence for the date.
- The oldest securely dated remains appear in 10000 BCE in the Guitarrero Cave, Yungay, then in the coast (in the districts Chilca and Paracas) and in the highlands (in the Callejón de Huaylas).
- 3000 years later (7000 BCE), people became sedentary (Jisk'a Iru Muqu, Kotosh, Huaca Prieta) so they began to cultivate plants such as gourds and cotton (Gossypium barbadense). These early crops were mainly industrial, and were used in fishing. The cotton was used to make nets and lines, while the gourds were used as floats. Larger, more complex societies formed around 3000 BCE, and this is now known as the Cotton Preceramic Period, which was part of the Andean preceramic period. These early societies focused on the gathering of marine resources and did not rely on maize, as later civilizations did. Subsequent technical developments include innovations in spinning and knitting of cotton and wool. There is also evidence for some basketry, and metalwork (gold beads) during this period. Pottery developed in the Amazon Basin and spread to the Andean culture region around 4000 years ago. The period that ensued is now called the Initial or Ceramic. Maize was adopted as a staple crop, creating population growth because of its high carrying capacity. The population distribution moved from the coasts to river valleys because of the growing importance of farming.
- Zaña Valley, northern Peru, irrigation canals have been dated to 5400 and 6700 years ago (3400 BCE and 4700 BCE) and show communal work.
- A frieze at the Sechin Bajo site of the Casma/Sechin culture has been dated to 3600 BCE, the oldest monument found in Peru.
- Norte Chico civilization (Also known as the Caral-Supe civilization, nearly from 3,500 BCE to 1,800 BCE)"
- El Paraíso, Peru, a Late Preceramic cite in the Lima region (3500–1800 BC)
- Buena Vista, Peru, 4200-year-old observatory, Lima Region (2200 BCE)
- Ventarrón, 4000-year-old temple, Lambayeque Region, northern Peru (2000 BCE)
- Cupisnique culture (1500–1000 BCE)
- Chavín (900 BCE to 200 BCE)
- Paracas
- Moche
- Nazca
- Tiahuanaco
- Wari
- Chimú

These cultures developed advanced techniques of cultivation, gold and silver work, pottery, metallurgy and weaving. Some of the social structures that later (around the 12th century) formed the base of the Inca Empire may be traced back to these previous periods.

== Archaeological findings ==
Archaeologists led by Gabriel Prieto revealed the largest mass child sacrifice with more than 140 children skeleton and 200 Llamas dating to the Chimú culture after he was informed about some children had found bones in a dune nearby Prieto’s fieldwork in 2011.

According to the researchers' notes in the study, there was cut marks on the sterna, or breastbones some of the children and the llamas. Children’s faces were smeared with a red pigment during the ceremony before their chests had been cut open, most likely to remove their hearts.Remains showed that these kids came from different regions and when the children and llamas were sacrificed, the area was drenched with water.

“We have to remember that the Chimú had a very different world view than Westerners today. They also had very different concepts about death and the role each person plays in the cosmos, perhaps the victims went willingly as messengers to their gods, or perhaps Chimú society believed this was the only way to save more people from destruction” said anthropologists Ryan Williams.

== Gallery ==
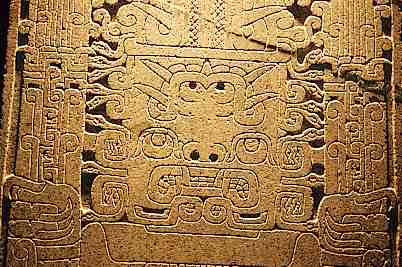
The Stele from the Chavín Culture, Ancash, Peru

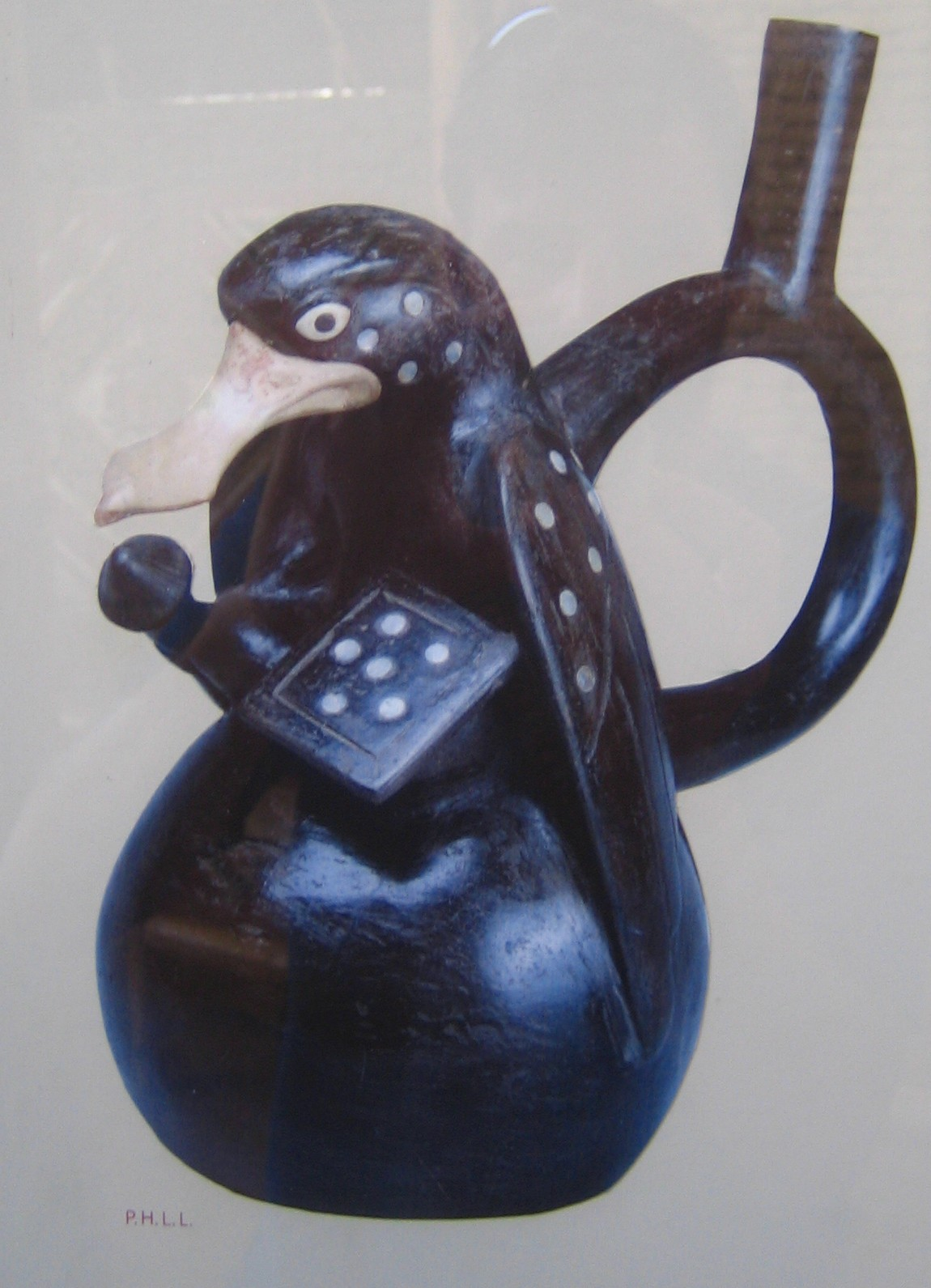
Moche pottery, Lambayeque, Peru

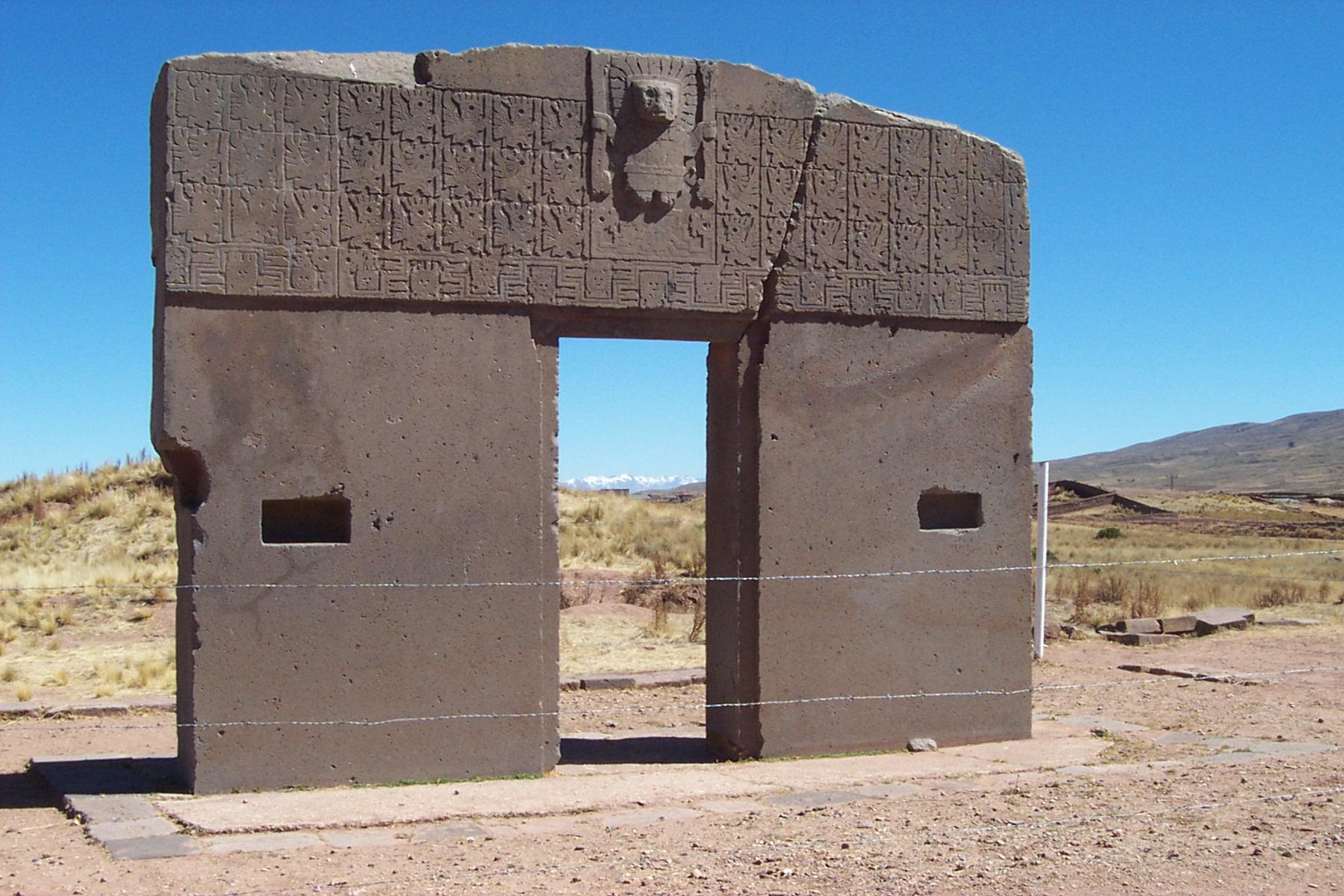
The Tiahuanaco Gate of the Sun, Bolivia

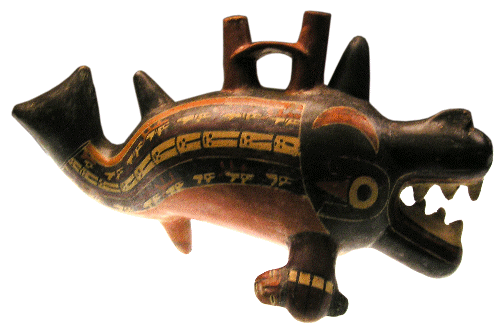
Polychrome, fish-shaped, nazca double spout and bridge vessel, Ica, Peru

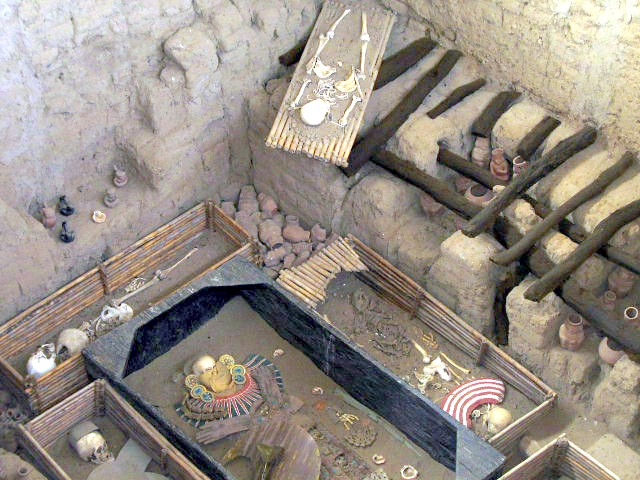
The Lord of Sipán

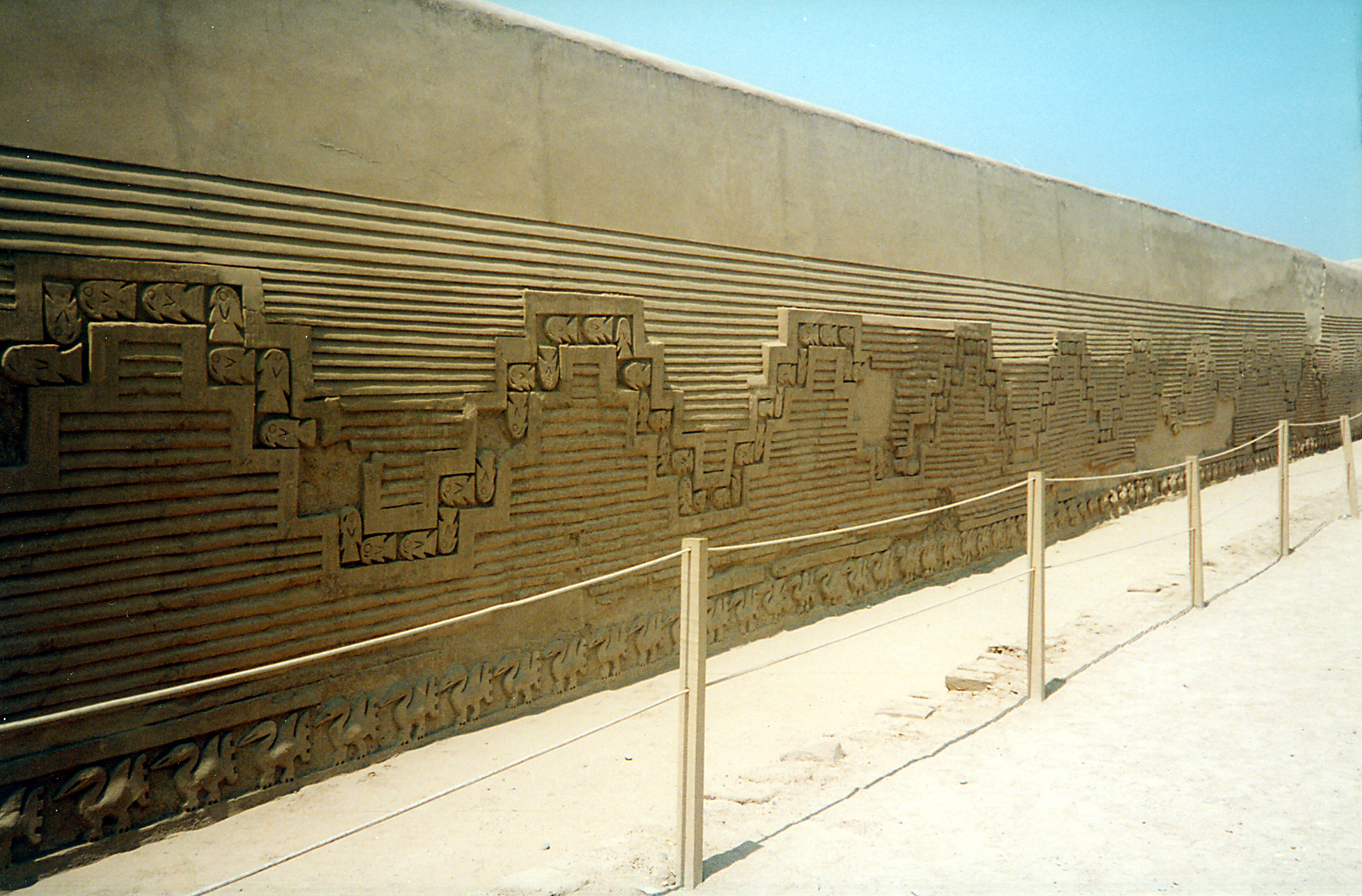
Chan Chan

== Time line of ancient cultures in Peruvian history ==
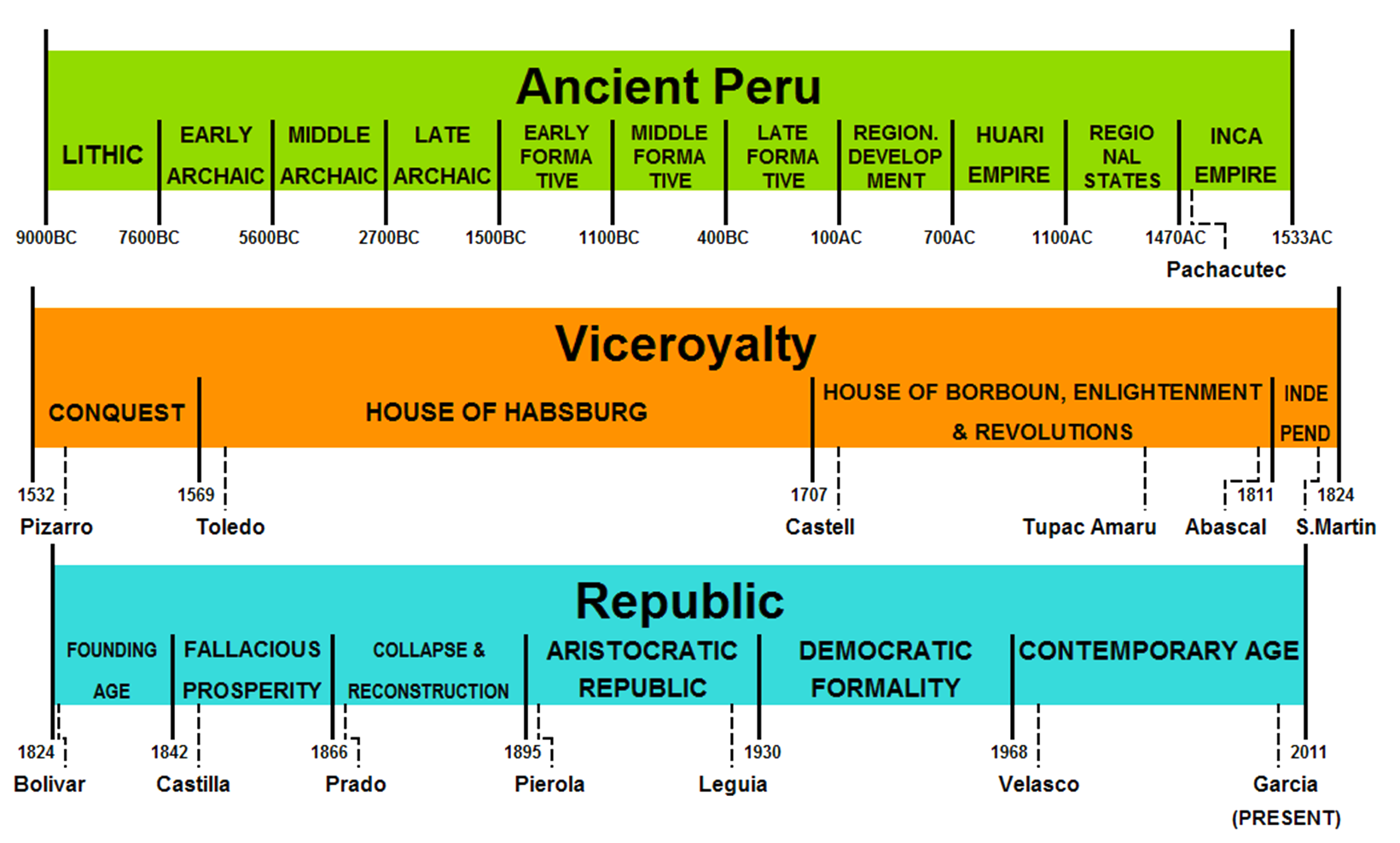

== See also ==
- Cultural periods of Peru
- Inca Empire
- Pre-Columbian era
- Amazonas before the Inca Empire
