= Periodization of pre-Columbian Peru =

System for dating cultural periods in the Andean Region

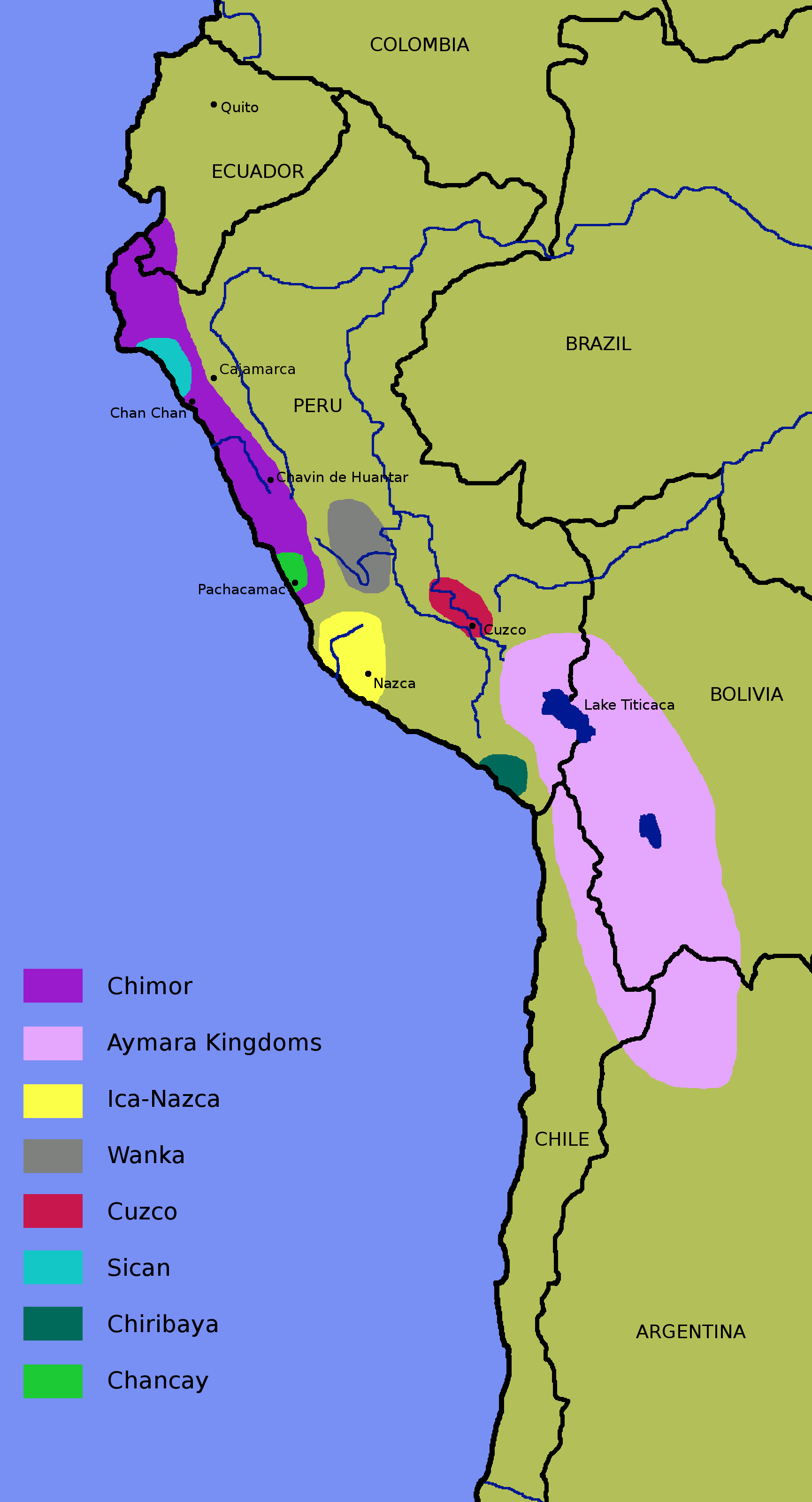
Major cultures in Peru in the Late Intermediate Period (1000–1400) Chimor / Chimú culture Aymara kingdoms Ica-Nazca culture Huanca (Wanka) culture Kingdom of Cusco (Cuzco) Sican culture Chiribaya culture Chancay culture

The cultural periods of Peru and the Andean Region were categorized by John Rowe and Edward Lanning and used by some archaeologists studying the area. An alternative periodization was developed by Luis Lumbreras and provides different dates for some archaeological finds.

Most of the cultures of the Late Horizon and some of the cultures of the Late Intermediate joined the Inca Empire by 1493, but the period ends in 1532 because that marks the fall of the Inca Empire after the Spanish conquest. Most of the cut-off years mark either an end of a severe drought or the beginning of one. These marked a shift of the most productive farming to or from the mountains and tended to mark the end of one culture and the rise of another.

The more recent findings concerning the Norte Chico civilization are not included on this list, as it was compiled before the site at Caral was investigated in detail.

Period	Dates	Cultures
Lithic and Andean preceramic
Period I	12,000 BCE – 9500 BCE	Red Zone (12000 BCE – 10500 BCE), Oquendo (10500 BCE – 9500 BCE)
Period II	9500 BCE – 8000 BCE	Chivateros I
Period III	8000 BCE – 6000 BCE	Arenal, Chivateros II, Lauricocha I, Playa Chira, Puyenca, Toquepala I
Period IV	6000 BCE – 4200 BCE	Ambo, Canario, Siches, Lauricocha II, Luz, Toquepala II
Period V	4200 BCE – 2500 BCE	Honda, Lauricocha III, Pernil Alto, Sechin Bajo, Viscachani, Jisk'a Iru Muqu
Period VI (Cotton Pre-ceramic)	2500 BCE – 1800 BCE	Norte Chico (Caral), Buena Vista, Casavilca, Culebras, Ventarron, Viscachani, Huaca Prieta, Las Haldas, Jisk'a Iru Muqu
Ceramic
Initial Period (also called Formative Period)	1800 BCE – 900 BCE	Early Chiripa, Kotosh, Cupisnique, Toríl (the Cumbe Mayo aqueduct was built c. 1000 BCE), Las Haldas, Qaluyu, Pukara, Casma–Sechin
Early Horizon (Also called Formative Period)	900 BCE – 200 BCE	Chavín, Late Chiripa, Paracas, Pechiche, Pukara, Sechura, Casma–Sechin
Early Intermediate	200 BCE – 600 CE	Moche, Nazca, Recuay, Lima, Pukara, Tiwanaku, Pechiche, Piura, Salinar, Vicus, Huarpa, Virú
Middle Horizon	600 CE – 1000 CE	Wari, Tiwanaku, Piura, Las Ánimas, Sican
Late Intermediate	1000 CE – 1476 CE	Chimú, Cajamarca, Piura, Chancay, Chachapoya, Chincha, Chiribaya, Chucuito, Huaman Huilca, Ilo, Qotu Qotu, Pacacocha, Palli Marca, Piura, Sican, Tajaraca, Huaylas, Conchucos, Huamachuco, Rucanas, Chanka, Wanka, Aymara kingdoms (Qulla, Lupaca, Charca, Kana, Qanchi), Ayabaca, Bracamoros, Huancabambas, Tallán, Tumpis, Huarco, Coayllo, Ichma, Parinacota, Cuntis, Chinchaycochas, Huarochiri, Kheswas, Yaro, Atavillo, Cantas, Yauyos, Tarmas, Paltas, Camanas (peruvian culture), Huayuri
Late Horizon	1476 CE – 1534 CE	Inca

== See also ==
- Ancient Peru
- Amazonas before the Inca Empire
- The Pre-Incan Lost Pyramid of Puñay
- Mesoamerican chronology
