= Palpa =

Palpa may refer to:

== In Peru ==
- Palpa, Aucallama, a town in Aucallama District, Huaral Province
- Palpa, Peru, a town in Palpa District, and capital of Palpa Province
- Palpa District, Peru, a district in Palpa Province
- Palpa Province, a province in Ica Region

== In Nepal ==
- Palpa District, a district in Lumbini Province

== Languages ==
- Palpa, a dialect of the Sino-Tibetan Western Magar language
- Palpa language (Indo-Aryan), a purported language related to Nepali
