= Palpa, Peru =

Palpa Palpa
- Town
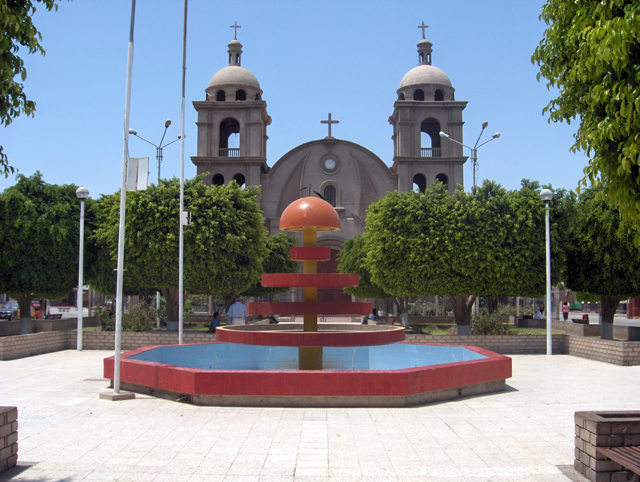
- Palpa Armas Square (Plaza de Armas en Palpa)

- Location within Peru
- Coordinates: 14°32′2.16″S 75°11′7.74″W
- Country: Peru
- Region: Ica
- Province: Palpa
- District: Palpa
- Demonym: Palpena(o)
- City Established: December 27, 1963

Government
  - Mayor: Jorge Pacheco Martinez
- Elevation: 347 m (1,138 ft)
- Time zone: UTC-5 (PET)

Palpa is a town in southern Peru, capital of the province of Palpa in the Ica region.

== Archeological sites ==
As the capital of the Palpa Province, the area is rich in archeological sites. Some have been around since the Archaic Period all the way up to the Incan Empire's decline in the Late Intermediate Period. These sites include: Pernil Alto; Huayuri; Pinchago Bajo and Pinchago Alto; Mollake Chico; PAP-294; PAP-365; PAP-64A and PAP-64B; Juaranga; Los Molinos; Estaqueria; La Muña; El Arenal; Chillo; Parasmarca; and PAP-379. Sites with the name Alto refer to a higher portion of a site, while the Bajo refers to a lower region of it. Each of these sites includes artifacts, such as ceramic pieces, that date the sites themselves through the layers, as well as identify the civilizations that occupied the sites. Most of the sites are close to the town, with it being centrally located between them. Despite the central location, some of these sites are harder to reach based on their physical location, and the ravines worn into the mountains by rivers over time. As a result, new methods of exploration had to be introduced and developed, including 3D Modeling.

== Climate ==
Climate data for Palpa, elevation 340 m (1,120 ft), (1991–2020)
| Month | Jan | Feb | Mar | Apr | May | Jun | Jul | Aug | Sep | Oct | Nov | Dec | Year |
|---|---|---|---|---|---|---|---|---|---|---|---|---|---|
| Mean daily maximum °C (°F) | 34.2 (93.6) | 34.7 (94.5) | 34.8 (94.6) | 33.4 (92.1) | 31.1 (88.0) | 28.3 (82.9) | 27.5 (81.5) | 28.6 (83.5) | 30.4 (86.7) | 31.7 (89.1) | 32.6 (90.7) | 33.6 (92.5) | 31.7 (89.1) |
| Mean daily minimum °C (°F) | 19.2 (66.6) | 19.9 (67.8) | 18.9 (66.0) | 16.3 (61.3) | 12.4 (54.3) | 9.9 (49.8) | 8.2 (46.8) | 8.2 (46.8) | 9.8 (49.6) | 11.8 (53.2) | 13.2 (55.8) | 16.6 (61.9) | 13.7 (56.7) |
| Average precipitation mm (inches) | 2.7 (0.11) | 1.7 (0.07) | 0.7 (0.03) | 0.1 (0.00) | 0.1 (0.00) | 0.1 (0.00) | 0.1 (0.00) | 0.1 (0.00) | 0.1 (0.00) | 0.1 (0.00) | 0.0 (0.0) | 0.2 (0.01) | 6 (0.22) |
Source: National Meteorology and Hydrology Service of Peru
