= Pikimachay =

Archaeological site in Peru

Piki Mach'ay
- location in Peru
- 13°02′27″S 74°13′27″W
- Location: Peru
- Region: Ayacucho Region

Piki Mach'ay (Quechua piki flea, mach'ay cave, "flea cave", also spelled Pikimachay, Piquimachay, where machay means "drunkenness", "to get drunk" or "a spindle packed with thread") is an archaeological site in the Ayacucho Valley of Peru. Radiocarbon dating from this cave indicates a human presence ranging from 22,200 to 14,700 years ago, but this evidence has been disputed and a more conservative date of 12,000 years BCE seems possible.

Richard S. MacNeish was the first archaeologist to explore Piki Mach'ay. Evidence of long-term human occupation has been found at the site, though that evidence still remains controversial.

The cave is part of the Ayacucho complex, a culture defined by several cave sites including Jaya Mach'ay ("pepper cave").

== Artifacts ==
Artifacts discovered in the site include unifacial chipped tools, such as basalt and chert tools, choppers, and projectile points, and bone artifacts of horses, camelids (Camelidae), giant sloths (Megatherium) dating from 15,000 to 11,000 years BCE.

== Agriculture ==
Piki Mach'ay yielded some of the oldest plant remains in Peru, including an 11,000-year-old bottle gourd. Strata from later periods at the site revealed fishtail point arrows, manos, and metates. Plant remains indicate that, before 3,000 years BCE, amaranth, cotton, gourds, lúcuma, quinoa, and squash were cultivated in the Ayacucho Basin before 3,000 years BCE. By 4,000 years BCE corn (Zea mays) and common beans were grown. Chili remains date from 5,500 to 4,300 years BCE. The large amounts of guinea pig bones suggest possible domestication, and llamas may have been domesticated by 4,300 to 2,800 years BCE.

== See also ==
- Toquepala
- Chivateros

== Bibliography ==
- Chapman, Jefferson. Tellico Archaeology: 12,000 Years of Native American History. Knoxville: Tennessee Valley Authority, 1994. ISBN 0-87049-871-1.
