= Río Grande District, Palpa =

Coordinates: 14.5201°S 75.2015°W

Río Grande
- District
- Interactive map of Río Grande
- Country: Peru
- Region: Ica
- Province: Palpa
- Founded: January 16, 1953
- Capital: Río Grande

Government
  - Mayor: Moises Aguayo Ramirez

Area
  - Total: 315.52 km^{2} (121.82 sq mi)
- Elevation: 354 m (1,161 ft)

Population (2005 census)
  - Total: 3,009
  - Density: 9.537/km^{2} (24.70/sq mi)
- Time zone: UTC-5 (PET)
- UBIGEO: 110403

Río Grande District is one of five districts of the province Palpa in Peru. The archaeological site of Pernil Alto is located in the district.

== Climate ==
Climate data for Río Grande, elevation 325 m (1,066 ft), (1991–2020)
Month	Jan	Feb	Mar	Apr	May	Jun	Jul	Aug	Sep	Oct	Nov	Dec	Year
Mean daily maximum °C (°F)	33.1 (91.6)	33.8 (92.8)	34.2 (93.6)	32.9 (91.2)	30.4 (86.7)	27.6 (81.7)	26.9 (80.4)	28.0 (82.4)	29.7 (85.5)	30.9 (87.6)	31.6 (88.9)	32.5 (90.5)	31.0 (87.7)
Mean daily minimum °C (°F)	18.9 (66.0)	19.4 (66.9)	18.7 (65.7)	16.4 (61.5)	12.8 (55.0)	10.2 (50.4)	9.3 (48.7)	9.5 (49.1)	10.9 (51.6)	12.6 (54.7)	13.6 (56.5)	16.5 (61.7)	14.1 (57.3)
Average precipitation mm (inches)	3.2 (0.13)	2.6 (0.10)	0.4 (0.02)	0.1 (0.00)	0.1 (0.00)	0.1 (0.00)	0.2 (0.01)	0.1 (0.00)	0.1 (0.00)	0.1 (0.00)	0.1 (0.00)	0.1 (0.00)	7.2 (0.26)
Source: National Meteorology and Hydrology Service of Peru
