= Lauricocha culture =

Andean preceramic culture

Lauricocha
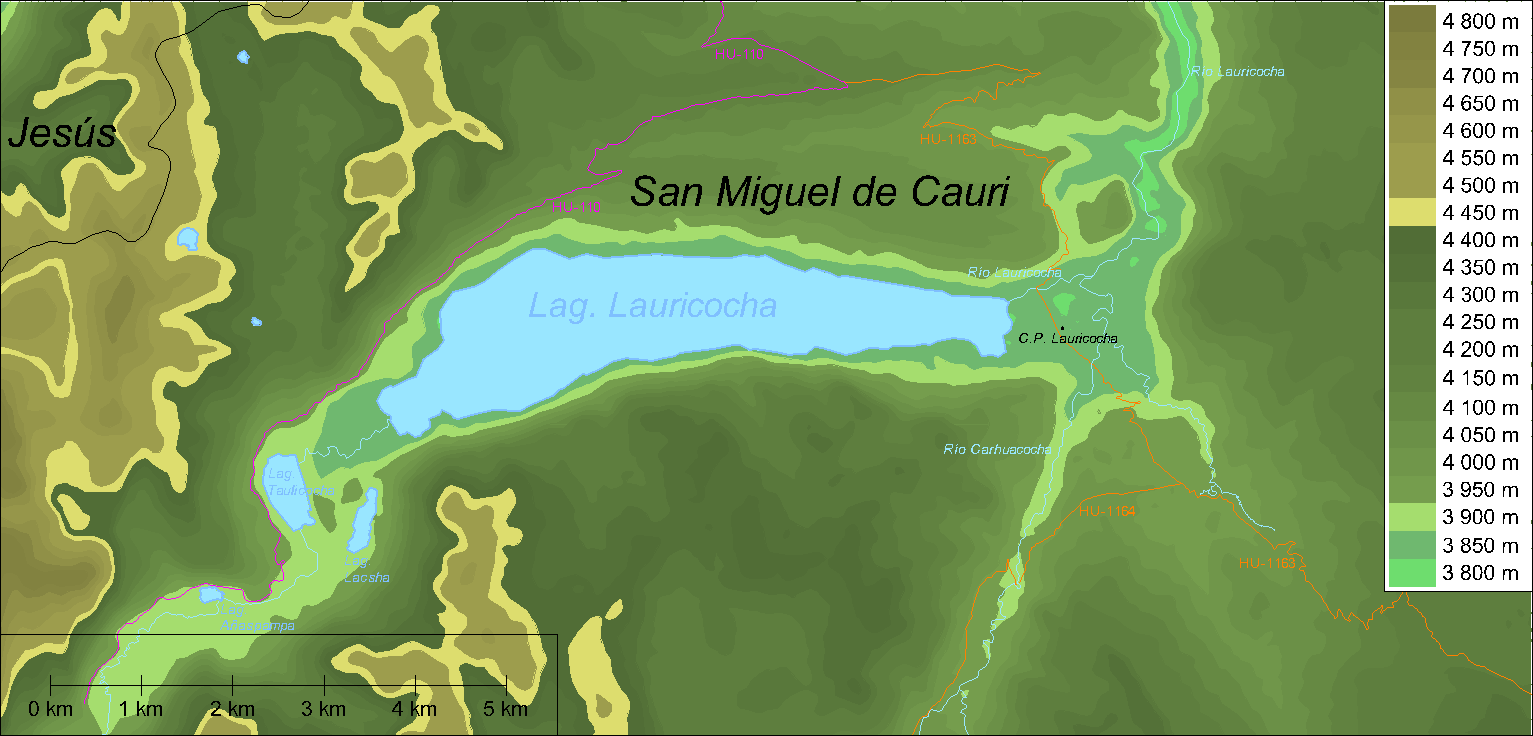
- Map of the area around Lake Lauricocha
- Geographical range: Peru
- Period: Andean preceramic
- Dates: c. 8000 BCE – c. 2500 BCE
- Type site: Lauricocha Cave
- Preceded by: Chivateros
- Followed by: Norte Chico

The Lauricocha culture is an Andean preceramic sequence in central Peru, spanning approximately 5,000 years from c. 8000 to 2500 BC. Its type culture is the Lauricocha Cave, discovered in 1957 at an altitude of over 4000 m near Lauricocha Lake. It contained human remains, the oldest found in Peru, which can be dated back to the last glacial period, c. 9,500 years ago.

The total prehistoric sequence in Peru spans 15,000 years, starting at about 13,000 BC when the first gatherer-hunter societies left their traces in the Ayacucho and Ancash highlands. These were populations that were migrating from the North American continent through Central America and populated the Andes. Traces of these early groups have been found in rock caves of Lauricocha, Pacaicasa and Guitarrero.

The early Peruvian groups of gatherers and hunters traversed between the rugged highlands and the coastal areas, following the movement of the wild animal herds and the climatic change of the seasons. Lauricocha near Huánuco was one of the important mountain encampments. The art of working stone to arrow points and fine blades was sophisticated, and the people made cave paintings of animals, hunting scenes and dances.

Lauricocha periods

- Lauricocha I: 8000 – 6000 BC (Andean preceramic III)
- Lauricocha II: 6000 – 4200 BC (Andean preceramic IV)
- Lauricocha III: 4200 – 2500 BC (Andean preceramic V)

== See also ==
- Amotape complex
- Paiján culture
