= Palpa province =

Coordinates: 14.534031°S 75.184964°W

Palpa
- Province
- Location of Palpa in the Ica Region
- Country: Peru
- Region: Ica
- Founded: December 27, 1963
- Capital: Palpa

Government
  - Mayor: José Luis Montaño Yarasca (2019-2022)

Area
  - Total: 1,232.88 km^{2} (476.02 sq mi)

Population (2005 census)
  - Total: 13,363
  - Density: 10.839/km^{2} (28.072/sq mi)
- UBIGEO: 1104

Palpa is the smallest of five provinces of the Ica Region of Peru and the only landlocked province of the region. The capital of the province is the city of Palpa.

== Boundaries ==
- North: Huancavelica Region
- East: Ayacucho Region
- South: province of Nazca
- West: province of Ica

== Political division ==
The province of Palpa is divided into five districts (Spanish: distritos, singular: distrito), each of which is headed by a mayor (alcalde):

=== Districts ===
- Llipata
- Palpa
- Río Grande
- Santa Cruz
- Tibillo

== History ==
The province of Palpa has been involved with several pre-Columbian societies, from the Archaic Period to the Late Intermediate Period. As a result, there are traces from these civilizations, which include the Nasca Lines and various archeological sites near Palpa, Peru, including Pinchango Alto. Other sites include: Pinchango Bajo, Mollake Chico, PAP-294, PAP-365, PAP-64A and PAP-64B, Juaranga, Los Molinos, Estaqueria, La Muña, El Arenal, Chillo, Parasmarca, PAP-379, Pernil Alto, and Huayuri. There has been work done here in 3D modeling of the Nasca Lines.

Artifacts from the following civilizations have been found in the chronology of the Palpa Valleys: Paracas, Nasca, Wari, and the Inka. Like many other Andean civilizations, there is overlap between them. Other civilizations include the Loro and Chakimpampa, but little is known as there is a gap in the Middle Horizon Period. Each period, and with them the civilizations, had different styles of ceramics, which aided in the organizing of the timeline of the area.

== Archeological sites ==
=== Pinchango Alto, Palpa, Peru ===
One such famous archeological site is Pinchango Alto. It is the largest Late Intermediate Period site in the Palpa region, and is the upper part of a larger site, denoted by Alto, while the lower half is denoted by Bajo. Located roughly three kilometers north of the town of Palpa, it sits on the mountain Cerro Pinchango, between the Grande and Palpa rivers. This site is famous for its place in the experimentation of recreating the site with 3D modeling, as well as autonomous recording, both of which made examining the hard to reach site easier than before. Given its isolated location, it's one of the best preserved sites in the region. These methods allowed for proper examination without disturbing the site and area around it. Surveys in the region have shown that settlements first started in the Formative Period, and increased over time, but that there was also a partial abandonment during the Middle Period. The population grew again, however, during the Nasca period.

This site is specifically located on a plateau overlooking the Rio Grande, and is marked by old, deep pits. The site was likely an economic based one, with connections to mining. Many artifacts here have been dated to the Later Intermediate Period.

=== Pinchango Bajo, Palpa, Peru ===
This site is theorized to be the lower part of Pinchango Alto, given its location right below the other site. However, this site is not well preserved by comparison, as many structures have been destroyed by modern roads and waste dumps. Artifacts found in the area date back to the Late Intermediate Period as well.

=== Mollake Chico, Palpa, Peru ===
Located west of Pinchango Alto, excavations of the site revealed an Early Paracas tomb, as well as funerary items from the Nasca Period. There were also signs of settlement at this site.

=== Geoglyph sites ===
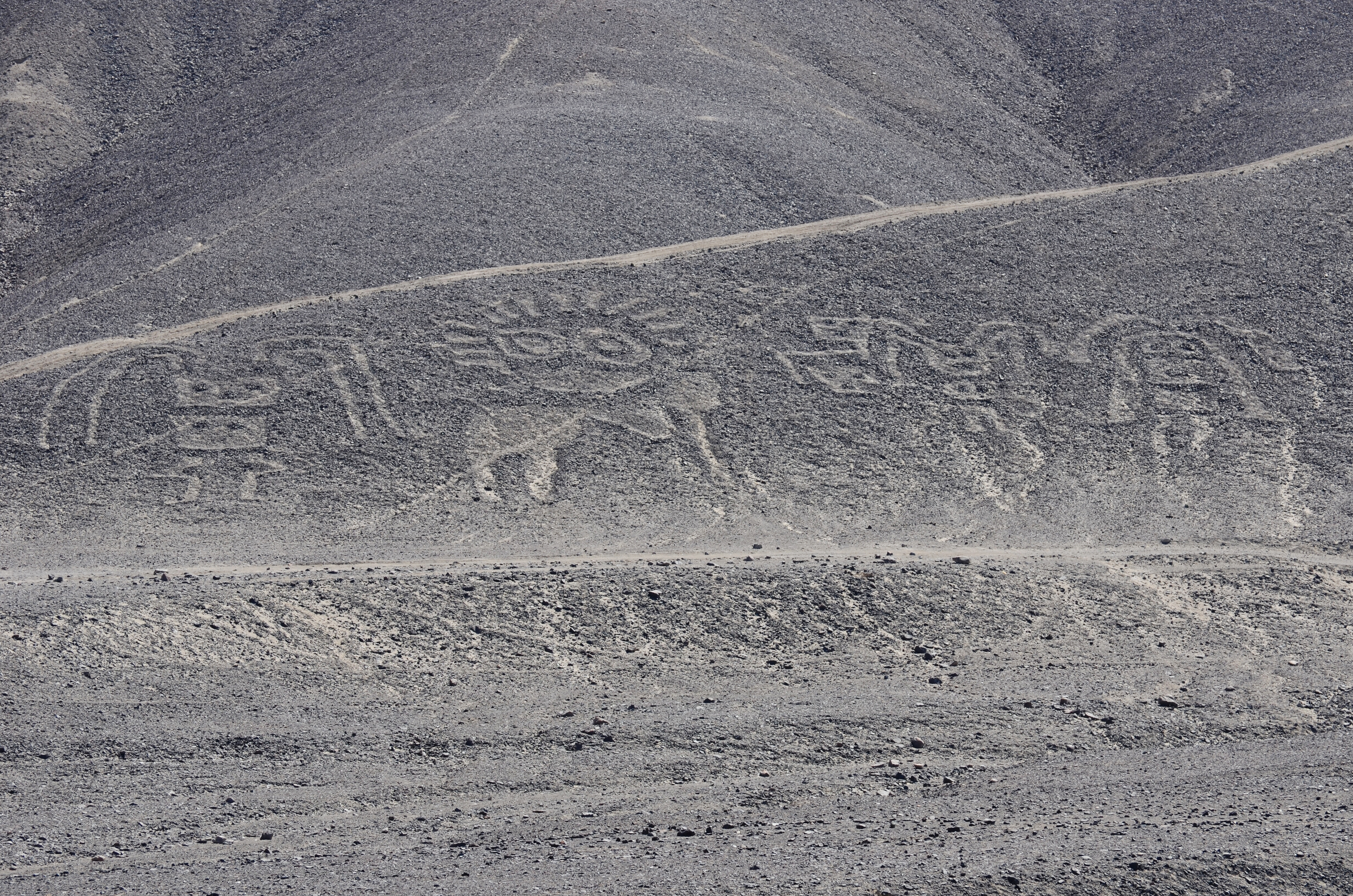
"The Family" set of Palpa geoglyphs

Geoglyphs refer to the type of structure that the Nazca Lines are, shapes drawn into the Earth. Sites PAP-294, PAP-365, PAP-64A and PAP-64B, and PAP-379 are all geoglyph sites in the Palpa region.

- PAP-294 Coordinates: UTM 481.604 E, 8.394.291 N
- PAP-365 Coordinates: UTM 481.504 E, 8.391.593 N
- PAP-64A and PAP-64B Coordinates]]: UTM 476.925, 8.392.634 N. PAP-64A is to the West, and PAP-64B is to the East.
- PAP-379 Coordinates: UTM 479.247 E, 8.389.797 N

=== Juaranga, Palpa ===
Located about three kilometers southwest of Palpa, this site is close to the Palpa River. This site holds primarily Paracas Period remains.

=== Los Molinos, Palpa ===
This site is located roughly 4 kilometers west of modern Palpa, near where the Rio Grande and Palpa River meet. Adobe brick structural remains have been found here, and the site has been dated at being built primarily during the Early Nasca Period, though had inhabitants during the Middle Horizon as well. In addition, the presence of funerary contexts and other evidence shows that the place was used as a cemetery at some point.

=== Estaqueria ===
This settlement is roughly 4 kilometers southwest of Palpa, and covers several hilltops with its terraces. Ceramic sherds of the Initial Nasca Period have been found here, as well as samples from wooden posts.

=== Pernil Alto, Palpa ===
Pernil Alto is another famous site in the region, located in the middle of the Rio Grande valley. This site is one of the few sites known to have been occupied during the Archaic Period, and that has been more thoroughly excavated. After a time of abandonment in the Late Archaic Period, it was re-inhabited during the Initial Period. This introduced adobe structures to the site.

== Nazca Lines and 3D modeling ==
Given the nature of the Nazca Lines, studying them had been hampered for a long time, as accurate documentation was hard to get ahold of. Being major landmarks, outside in the weather, many factors made it difficult to get records of them- weather, people moving around them, and general lack of preservation to the structures. As a result, M. Sauerbier and K. Landers strove to attain records that wouldn't be changed by rainfall, as the region had been relatively dry, and as such didn't wash away the lines. With climate change becoming more of an issue, however, this could change at any time. Utilizing aerial imagery, they produced a 3D model of the northern part of the Nazca Lines, near the modern Palpa.

== See also ==
- Administrative divisions of Peru
- Lost City of Huayuri, Pre-Columbian archaeological site
- Pernil Alto, Pre-Columbian archaeological site
