= Peruvian wine =

Wine making in Peru

Peruvian wine dates back to the Spanish colonization of the region in the 16th century.

Peru shares a similar climate with wine-producing country Chile, which is favorable for producing wine. In 2008, there were some 14,000 hectares (35,000 acres) of grape plantations in Peru, including table grapes, and some 610,000 hectolitres (13,000,000 imp gal; 16,000,000 US gal) of wine was produced, with an increasing trend in both plantations and wine production. Most vineyards are located on the central coast, around Pisco and Ica, where most of Peru's winemaking and distillation takes place.

Grape varieties cultivated include Albillo, Alicante Bouschet, Barbera, Cabernet Sauvignon, Grenache, Malbec, Moscatel, Sauvignon blanc and Torontel - Torrontes in many areas of the world.

== History ==
The first grapevines were brought to Peru shortly after its conquest by Spain. Spanish chroniclers from the time note that the first vinification in South America took place in the hacienda Marcahuasi of Cuzco. However, the largest and most prominent vineyards of the 16th and 17th century Americas were established in the Ica valley of south-central Peru. In the 1540s, Bartolomé de Terrazas and Francisco de Carabantes began vineyards in Peru. The latter established vineyards in Ica, which Spaniards from Andalucia and Extremadura used to introduce grapevines into Chile.

The growth of mining in Potosí in present-day Bolivia, which became the largest city in the Americas in the 17th century, created a constant demand for wine which was supplied mainly from Peru. In Potosí part of salaries were paid with wine. Furthermore, Peruvian wine growers supplied the city of Lima, the most important political centre in South America in the 16th and 17th centuries.

In 1687, the whole southern coast of Peru was struck by the 1687 Peru earthquake which destroyed the cities of Villa de Pisco and Ica. The earthquake destroyed wine cellars and mud containers used for wine storage. This event marked the end of the Peruvian wine-boom. The suppression of the Society of Jesus in Spanish America in 1767 caused the Jesuit vineyards in Peru to be auctioned at high prices but new owners did not have the same expertise as the Jesuits contributing to a production decline. Peruvian wine-making was further challenged by the fact that production of pisco, also made from grapes, rose from being exceeded by wine in the early 18th century to representing 90% of Peruvian grape beverages prepared in 1764. Even after the shift to pisco production, vineyards in Peru encountered economic troubles due to the Spanish Crown lifting the ban on Peruvian rum production in the late 18th century, when rum was cheaper and but of lower quality than pisco.

The decline of Peruvian wine even caused Peru to import some wine from Chile as it happened in 1795 when Lima imported 5,000 troves (Spanish: botijas) from Concepción in southern Chile. This particular export showed the emergence of Chile relative to Peru as a wine-making region.

During the 19th century, Peruvian wine-making went further into decline. Demand in industrialized Europe caused many Peruvian winegrowers to shift the land use from vineyards to lucrative cotton fields, contributing further to the decline of the wine and pisco industry. This was particularly true during the time of the American Civil War (1861–1865) when the cotton prices skyrocketed due to the Blockade of the South and its cotton fields.

== See also ==
- Winemaking
- Agriculture in Peru
