= Amotape complex =

Archaeological culture

The Amotape complex is an archaeological culture on the northern coast of Peru dated to between c. 9,000 and 7,100 BCE. It constitutes some of the oldest evidence for human occupation of the Peruvian coast. The Amotape complex was identified by the American anthropologist James Richardson III, who located a dozen small camps in the Peruvian coastal desert at the foot of the Amotape hills, near the modern city of Talara. The people of the Amotope complex were hunter–gatherers who manufactured unifacial stone tools in chalcedony and quartzite to exploit a variety of local plants and animals. They also collected shellfish in the mangrove swamps which covered the coastline at that time.

The contemporary developments at Huaca Prieta and Siches area (north Peru, close to Ecuador) also share similar features.

== See also ==
- Lauricocha culture
- Paiján culture
