= Tibillo District =

Coordinates: 14.0937°S 75.1720°W

Tibillo
- District
- Interactive map of Tibillo
- Country: Peru
- Region: Ica
- Province: Palpa
- Founded: January 16, 1953
- Capital: Tibillo

Government
  - Mayor: José Luis Montaño Yarasca

Area
  - Total: 328.04 km^{2} (126.66 sq mi)
- Elevation: 2,167 m (7,110 ft)

Population (2005 census)
  - Total: 474
  - Density: 1.44/km^{2} (3.74/sq mi)
- Time zone: UTC-5 (PET)
- UBIGEO: 110405

Tibillo District is one of five districts of the province Palpa in Peru.
