= Santa Cruz District, Palpa =

District in Ica, Peru

Coordinates: 14.4834°S 75.2458°W

Santa Cruz District
- District
- Interactive map of Santa Cruz District
- Country: Peru
- Region: Ica
- Province: Palpa
- Founded: January 16, 1953
- Capital: Santa Cruz

Government
  - Mayor: Fermin Nicolas Quichica Quispe

Area
  - Total: 255.7 km^{2} (98.7 sq mi)
- Elevation: 538 m (1,765 ft)

Population (2005 census)
  - Total: 1,060
  - Density: 4.15/km^{2} (10.7/sq mi)
- Time zone: UTC-5 (PET)
- UBIGEO: 110404

Santa Cruz District is one of five districts of the province Palpa in Peru. A large Pre-Comlumbian archaeological site called the Lost City of Huayuri is located in the district.

== Tourism ==
The Santa Cruz District is a common destination for hikers, interested in Punta Union (peak) and Cordillera Blanca. The hiking tracks offer an elevation of up to 4,760 meters above sea level. The majority of the trekking companies are located in Huaraz, one of the biggest towns in the Peruvian Andes. The 4 and 5-day passing treks are in the Andes are considered one of the most beautiful in South America.
