= Paiján culture =

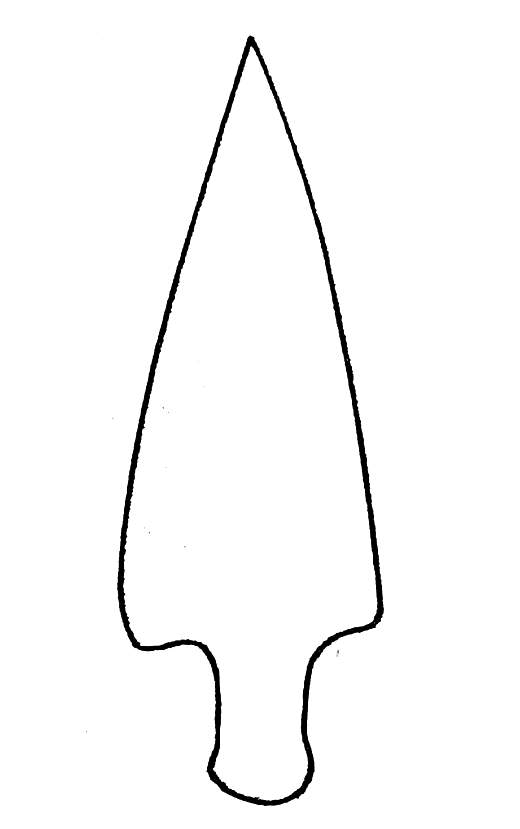
Example of Paijan projectile points

The Paiján culture was an archaeological culture that emerged on the northern coast of Peru between 13,000 and 10,000 cal BP (11,000-8,000 BCE). It was first described by Peruvian archaeologist Rafael Larco Hoyle in the 1940s from the Pampa de los Fósiles site. Later research by French archaeologist Claude Chauchat identified dozens of open air sites, which include camps, workshops and quarries.

Chivateros is a notable prehistoric stone tool quarry in the Ventanilla District of Peru associated with Paijan culture.

Generally, this culture would belong to the Lithic stage of cultural development.

== Geography ==
Most findings are concentrated along the valleys of the rivers Jequetepeque, Cupisnique, Chicama and Moche in the northern coast of Peru; more limited evidences of Paiján presence have been found in the central and south coasts of Peru as well as in the highland site of El Inga in Ecuador.

== Environment ==
The Paiján environment was arid with sparse vegetation and small animals such as rodents, lizards and snails. Additional resources were provided by the sea which at the time was located 15 kilometers further than today due to a lower sea level. To adapt to this environment, the Paiján developed long needle–like projectile points which were mounted on hollow shafts of cane or reed and used as harpoons to catch fish. They also collected snails, hunted small animals such as vizcachas and used grinding stones to process plants.

=== Paijan projectile points ===
Paijan stemmed points are separated into several classes when being classified as they are found on sites. These classes include: lanceolate, triangular, intermediate, and miscellaneous.

- Lanceolate: have convex-sided bodies with a "maximum width that is different from the base; the tip is very long, thin and sharp".
- Triangular: have "straight sides with a maximum width that is located at the base of the body".
- Intermediate: have a "maximum width that may be at the base of the convex-sided body or convexity may be so poor that attribution is dubious".
- Miscellaneous: have "stemmed points that do not fall within the other three classes".

== Common tools ==
Common Paijan tools used included single and double sidescrapers, unifaces – pieces or tabular blocks retouched on one face only all around the edge to give them an ovate shape, borers – rare small jasper blocks that have three points, and most abundantly - denticulates which have thick, steep edges. Bifaces are another common artifact found on Paiján sites.

== Time period ==
Based on the evidence as of 2015, the Paiján complex has been dated to ca. 13,000-10,000 cal BP.

Early Paiján sites indicate large bands that moved seasonally between the coastal plains and the western slopes of the Andes.

Late Paiján subphase sites feature three types of projectile points, Talambo, Contracting Narrow stem, and Contracting Broad stem types. They are now dated between 11,200 and 9,600 cal BP. These sites evidence smaller groups of decreased mobility. According to anthropologist Tom Dillehay, a possible explanation for this change is that an amelioration of the climate increased the availability of wild plants and animals; thus, Paiján people needed less movement to meet their requirements while still relying on hunting-gathering.

=== Oldest human remains ===
In 1975, at La Pampa de los Fósiles, Claude Chauchat discovered skeletal remains of a teenager about 12–13 years old, and of a young woman of about 25 years old, buried in a layer of ash. Radiocarbon studies gave an age of 10,200 ± 180 before present. They are therefore considered as the oldest human remains in Peru.

== See also ==
- Paiján
- Amotape complex
- Lauricocha culture
