= Llipata District =

Coordinates: 14.5633°S 75.2074°W

Llipata
- District
- Interactive map of Llipata
- Country: Peru
- Region: Ica
- Province: Palpa
- Founded: January 16, 1953
- Capital: Llipata

Government
  - Mayor: Justo Richard Mantilla Bendezu

Area
  - Total: 186.18 km^{2} (71.88 sq mi)
- Elevation: 303 m (994 ft)

Population (2005 census)
  - Total: 1,494
  - Density: 8.024/km^{2} (20.78/sq mi)
- Time zone: UTC-5 (PET)
- UBIGEO: 110402

Llipata District is one of five districts of the province Palpa in Peru.
