= Agricultural history of Peru =

The agricultural history of Peru includes agriculture, cultivation of plants and herbs and general changes in the history of farming in Peru or its historical regions.

== Pre-history ==
Much of the pre-history of Peru was driven by the location of farmable land. The most populated coastal regions of Peru are the two parallel mountain ranges and the series of 20 to 30 rivers descending through its coastal desert. In dry periods only the mountains had enough rainfall for agriculture while the desert coast was empty.

In wet periods many cultures thrived along the rivers. The Inca were a mountain-based culture that expanded when the climate became wetter, often sending conquered peoples down from the mountains into fallow but farmable lowlands. In contrast, the Moche were a lowland culture that died out after a strong El Niño, which caused abnormally high rainfall and floods followed by a long drought.

A study reported that crops of squash, peanuts, and cotton were domesticated in Peru around 10,000, 8,500, and 6,000 years ago, respectively. They were grown by the Ñanchoc people in the Ñanchoc Valley. No earlier instances of the farming of these crops are known.

=== Humboldt current ===
Peru is both afflicted and blessed by a peculiar climate due to the Humboldt Current. Before over fishing killed its fishery, Peru had the world's most productive fishery due to the cold Current. It lifts nutrients from the Pacific floor to surface waters. On land, it results in a cold mist that covers coastal Peru to the extent that desert plants have adapted to obtain water from the air instead of from (infrequent) rainfall. The wet side soil is thin, while few rivers operate on the dry side. This means all the water must be brought from the Atlantic side of the Andean mountain ranges that split Peru.

Many obstacles limited Peru's agricultural production. Peru has always been rich in natural resources such as tin, silver, gold, guano and rubber. These resources were found, not grown. Train tracks did not connect its peoples; instead they connected the sources of these valuable resources to the sea. So few ways helped to bring agricultural products to market.

The road system is underdeveloped in Peru, e.g., offering no connection to neighboring Brazil. Only a little over a quarter of the 15th-century Inca road system has been modernized. Another obstacle is the large size of Peru's informal economy. This prevents Peru from relying on an income tax to run the government. Much of its revenue instead comes from a 13% tax on gross agricultural sales. This squeezes Peruvian farmers who must compete with farmers in countries that tax farmers on net profit. No profit, no tax.

Twenty-first century Peru grows agricultural commodities such as asparagus, potatoes, maize, rice, quinoa and coffee. Peru provides half of the world supply of quinoa. Peruvian agriculture uses synthetic fertilizers rather than still-abundant guano due to infrastructure issues. Peruvian maize is not exportable due to large producer subsidies in Europe and the United States. Coffee is exportable, because little is grown in those countries. In recent years Peru has become the world's primary source of high-quality organic coffee. Peru does not have a quality control program such as Kenya's, but its government has worked to educate farmers on how to improve quality. Despite the glut of coffee in the market today, coffee production in Peru's unusual high altitudes and partial shade allows Coffea arabica to flourish, and it has much more of such land available than competitors such as Jamaica and Hawaii.

== Aqueducts and terraces ==
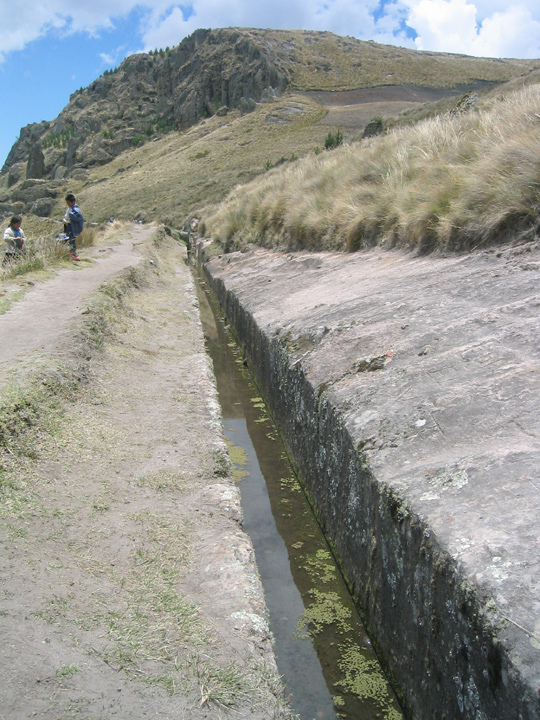
Aqueduct at Cumbe Mayo

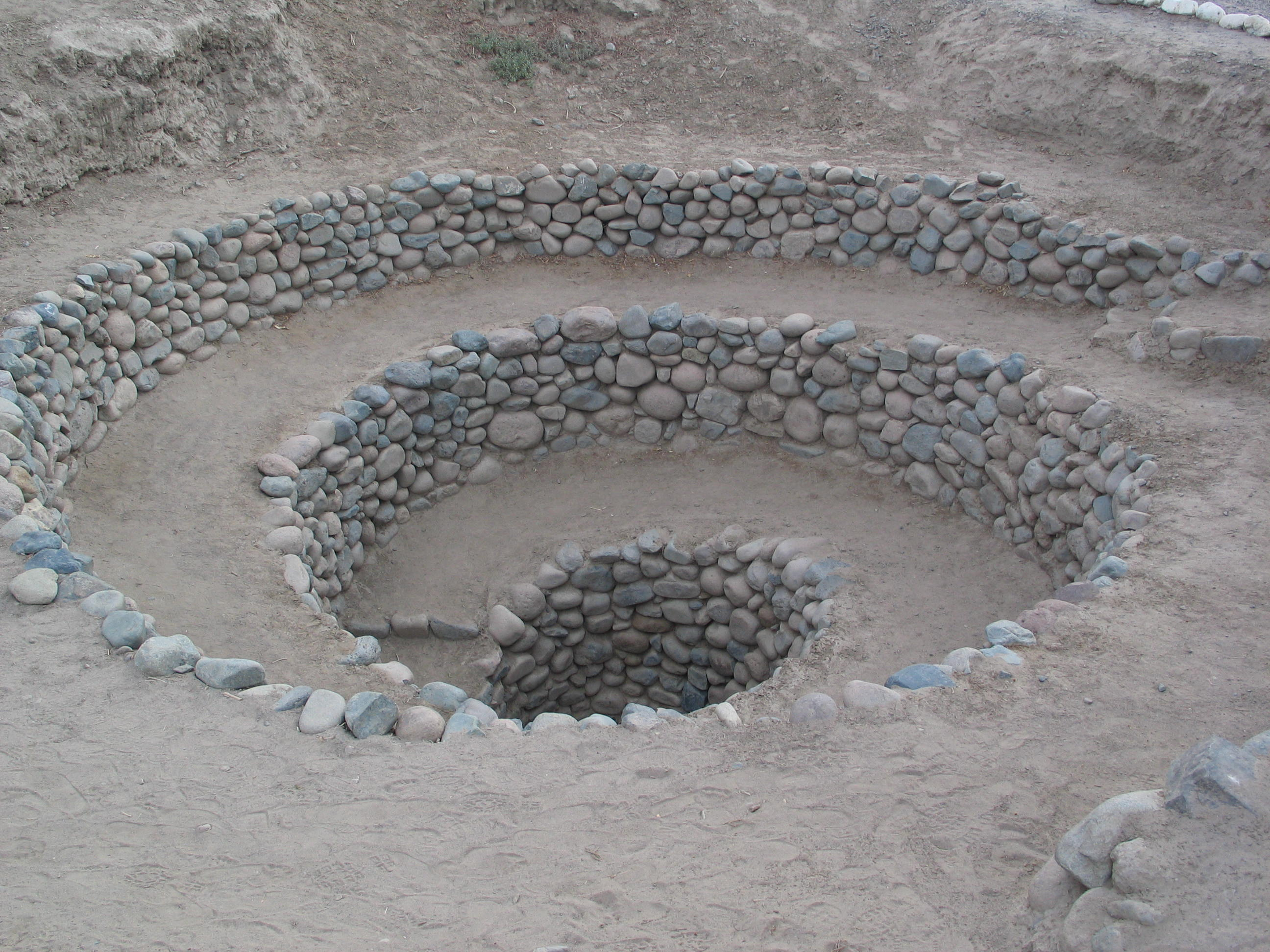
An entrance to Nazca's Puquios

The ancient people of Peru built water-moving and preserving technologies like the aqueducts of Cumbe Mayo (c. 1500 BCE) and the Nazca's underground aqueducts called Puquios (date uncertain), or the terraced gardens of the Huari. Aqueducts were also utilized by the Moche.

Another technique used for farming was terracing. The Chavin, Moche, and Incas built terraces, or andenes, into the sides of hills. The andenes reduced erosion that would normally damage a steep hill. These terraces are still used. Incans irrigated their fields with a system of reservoirs and cisterns to collect water, which was then distributed by canals and ditches.

However, by the mid-19th century, only 3% of Peru's land was still farmable. It lagged behind many other South American countries in agriculture.

== Guano ==
In the 19th century the Inca fertilizer guano (saltpetre) became the most important resource in Peru's modern history, for its use as a fertilizer and as gunpowder. The stock of guano built up because the Humboldt current once drew thousands of anchovies and other fish, which in turn, attracted thousands of birds. The population of white-breasted cormorants, gray pelicans and piqueros flourished due to a lack of predators. The guano (droppings) left by the birds retained its nitrate content because of the arid climate. Between 1840 and 1880, Peru sold around 20 million tons of guano, mostly to Great Britain. Peru earned about 2 billion dollars in profit.

Peru lost its guano reserves to Chile (backed by the British Empire) in the War of the Pacific. By the late 19th century, 50% of the Peruvian government's revenue was going to pay off loans that had been guaranteed with guano sources taken by Chile - these debts were eventually paid by sending all the remaining guano to France when it was preparing for war. The Germans invented the Haber process shortly after the outbreak of World War I, after which guano became almost worthless.

As Peru's guano reserves began to run out, the government restricted the guano industry to help stabilize the supplies. The collapse of Peru's bird population after the collapse of the fishery limited future supply of the fertilizer.

== Current production ==
Peru is one of the 5 largest producers of avocado, blueberry, artichoke and asparagus, one of the 10 largest producers in the world of coffee and cocoa, one of the 15 largest producers in the world of potato and pineapple, and also has a considerable production of grape, sugarcane, rice, banana, maize and cassava; its agriculture is considerably diversified.

In 2018, Peru produced 10.3 million tons of sugarcane, 5.1 million tons of potato, 3.5 million tons of rice, 2.2 million tons of banana, 1.5 million tons of maize, 1.2 million tons of cassava, 921 thousand tons of palm oil, 645 thousand tons of grape, 548 thousand tons of pineapple, 504 thousand tons of avocado, 481 thousand tons of tangerine, 502 thousand tons of orange, 369 thousand tons of coffee, 383 thousand tons of mango, 360 thousand tons of asparagus, 270 thousand tons of lemon, 252 thousand tons of tomato, 207 thousand tons of barley, 195 thousand tons of wheat, 188 thousand tons of olives, 187 thousand tons of carrots, 175 thousand tons of papaya, 175 thousand tons of pepper, 154 thousand tons of artichoke, 140 thousand tons of apple, 134 thousand tons of cocoa, in addition to smaller productions of other agricultural products.

There is also native agriculture and tools, such as the tacarpo, a tool used to cultivate Pachyrhizus tuberosus by the people in the Peruvian Amazon.

=== Wine ===
Peruvian wine dates back to the Spanish colonization of the region in the 16th century.

Peru shares a similar climate with wine-producing country Chile, which is favorable for producing wine. In 2008, there were some 14,000 hectares (35,000 acres) of grape plantations in Peru, including table grapes, and some 610,000 hectolitres (13,000,000 imp gal; 16,000,000 US gal) of wine was produced, with an increasing trend in both plantations and wine production. Most vineyards are located on the central coast, around Pisco and Ica, where most of Peru's winemaking and distillation takes place.

Grape varieties cultivated include Albillo, Alicante Bouschet, Barbera, Cabernet Sauvignon, Grenache, Malbec, Moscatel, Sauvignon blanc and Torontel - Torrontes in many areas of the world.

== Peruvian agricultural products ==
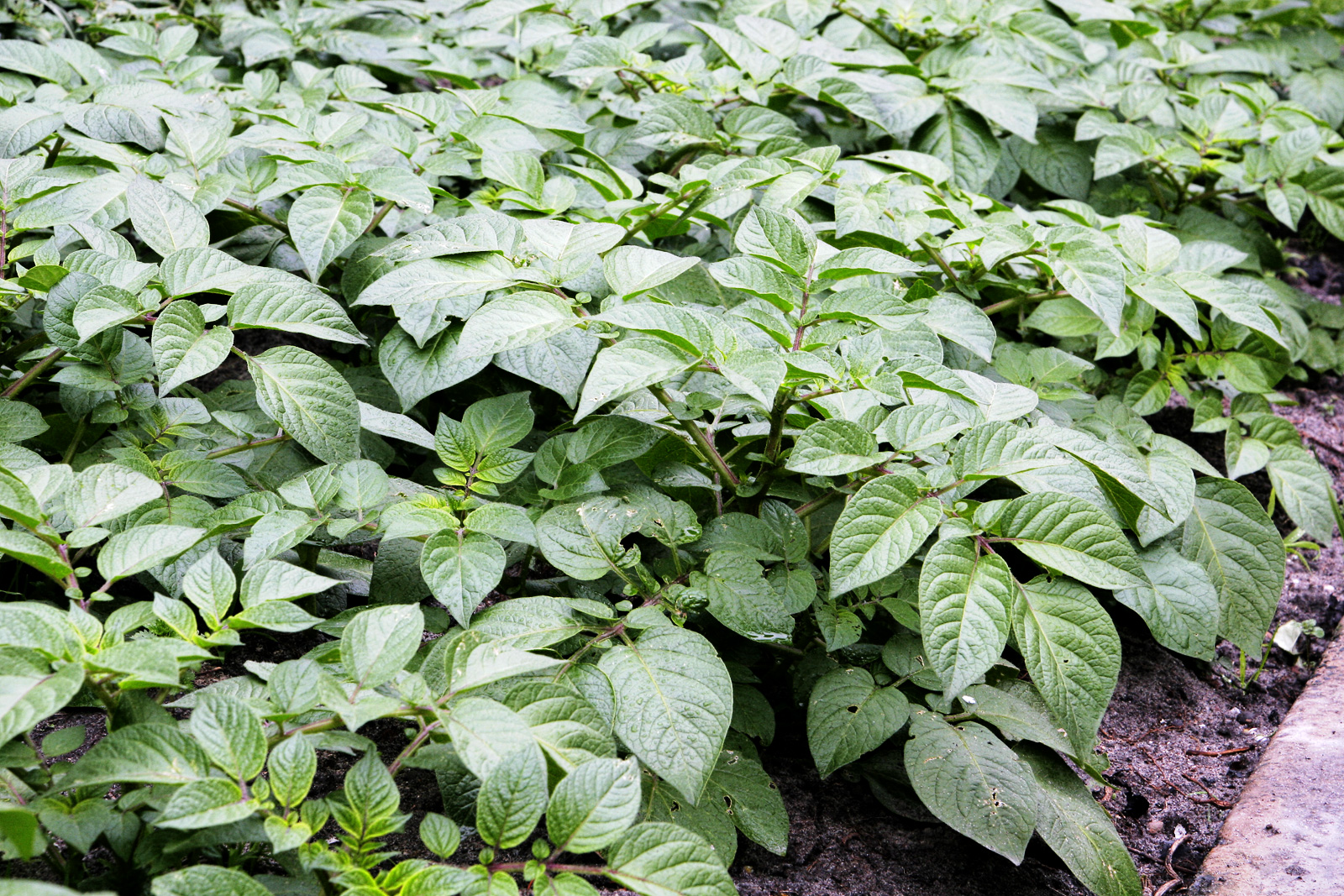
Potato plants

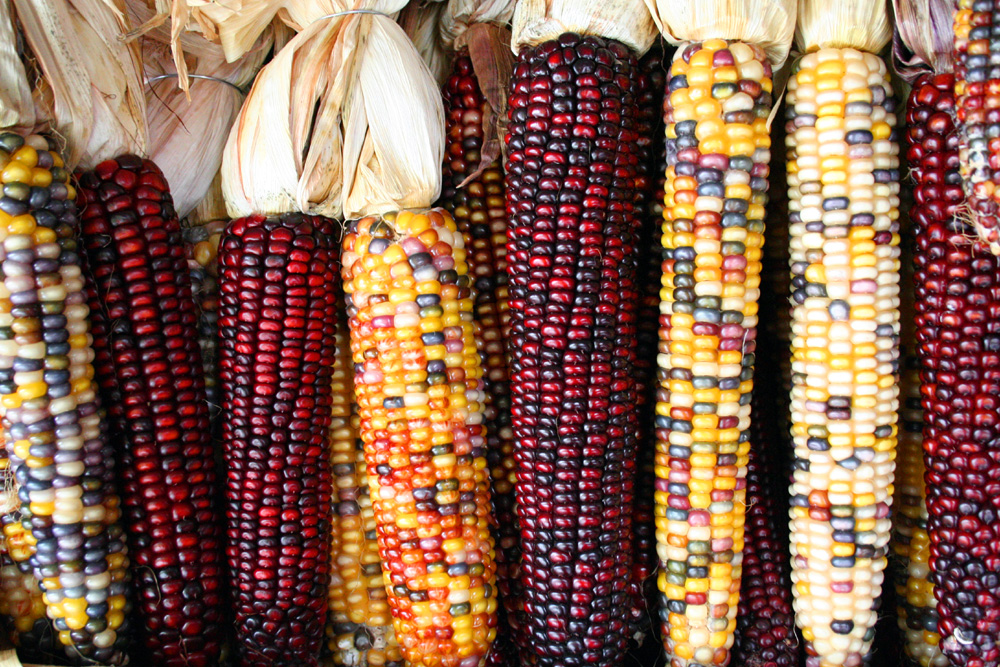
Maize ears

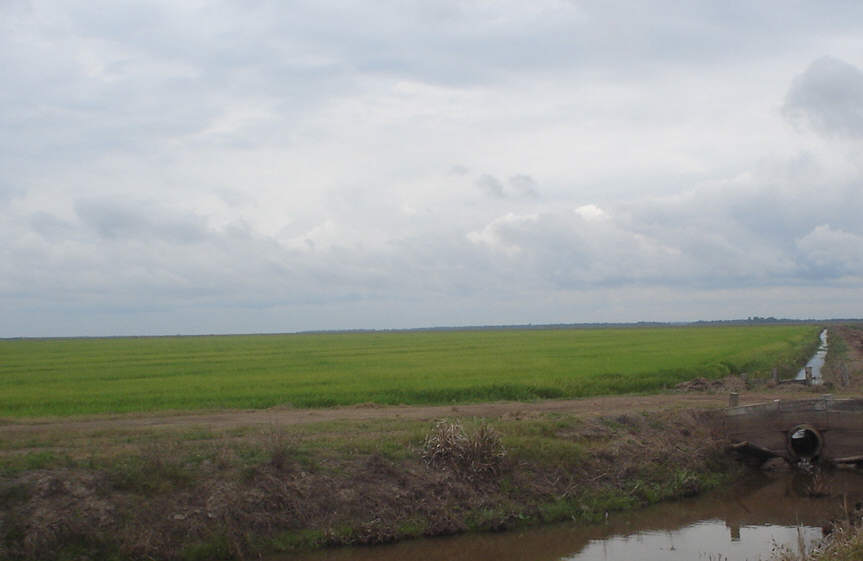
Rice field

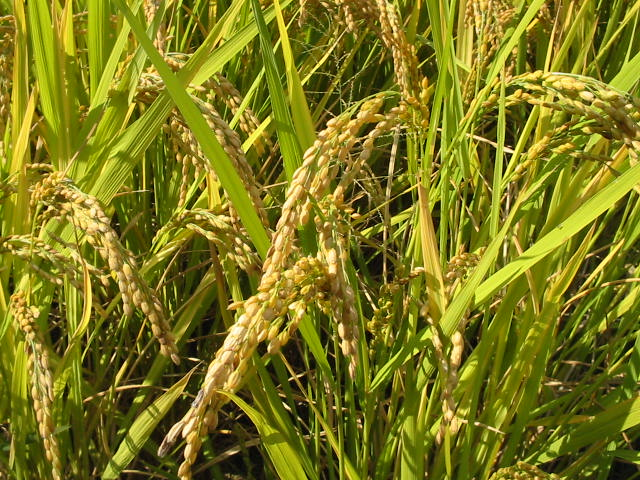
Rice plants

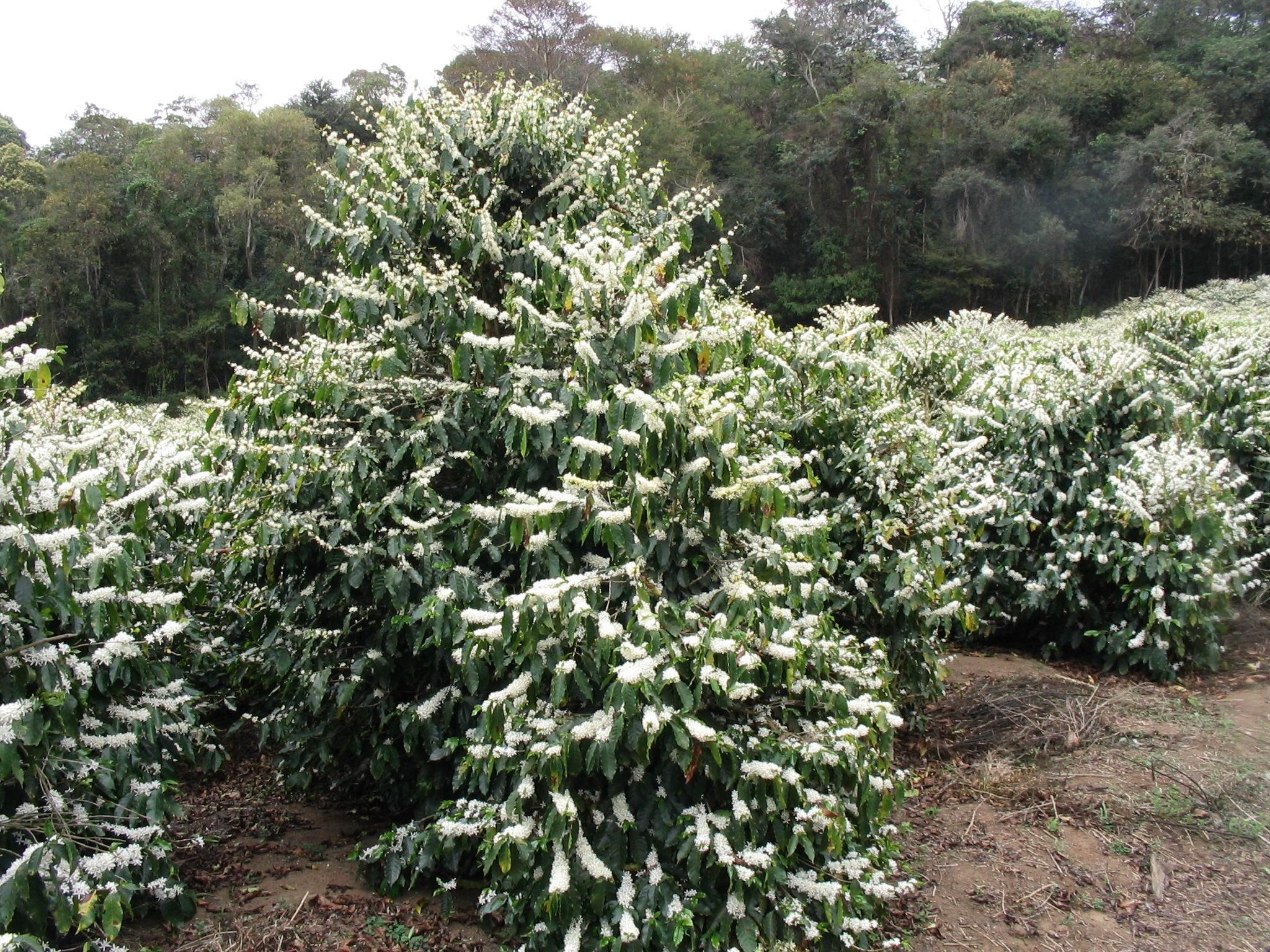
Flowering coffee tree

== See also ==
- Incan agriculture
- International Potato Center
- Ministry of Agriculture (Peru)
