= Cumbemayo =

Archaeological site in Peru

- Cumbe Mayo
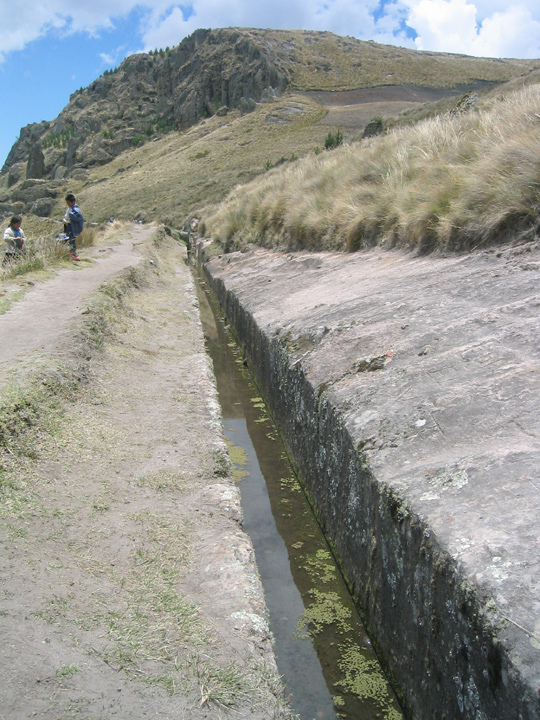
- Partial view of aqueduct at Cumbemayo.

- Location within Peru
- 07°11′23″S 78°34′26″W
- Type: Aqueduct, Temple, Petroglyphs
- Location: Peru; Cajamarca Province, Cajamarca

History
- Built: 1500 BCE
- Built by: Cajamarca culture

Site notes
- Archaeologists: Julio C. Tello

Cumbemayo or Cumbe Mayo is an archaeological site located 20 kilometers southwest of the city of Cajamarca in Peru at 3,500 meters of elevation. Built around 1500 B.C.E, it comprises aqueducts, a grotto and petroglyphs; all within an area of rock formations.

== History ==
The aqueduct and the petroglyphs at Cumbemayo are thought to be built circa 1500 - 1000 BC, the petroglyphs being similar to those of Chavín culture.

== Aqueduct ==
One of the main attractions of Cumbemayo, or "Narrow River" in Cajamarca Quechua, is the aqueduct. This is a canal of approximately 9 km in length, carefully carved in volcanic rock to divert the water from the hills to cultivation fields and a large reservoir; which is presumably originally at the foot of the Santa Apolonia Hill.

Heading towards the aqueduct one can observe some stairways sculpted in stone, and a carved stone which had been used as a ceremonial altar. Also prominent is the Sanctuary, a huge cliff resembling a man's head, whose mouth would be a grotto, where interesting but undecipherable petroglyphs have been found. The caves and shelters of the area evidence other stone engravings, where visitors claim to see anthropomorphic images.

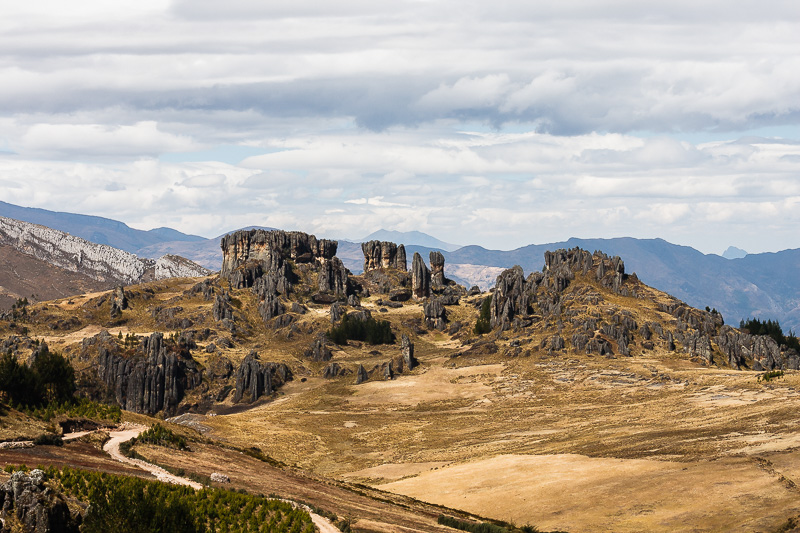
Los Frailones, rock formations at Cumbemayo.

The aqueduct winds down the hills toward the city of Cajamarca, stretching out over about five miles (8.0 km) in length. The canals brought water from the high grounds to the valleys below, which was especially valuable during times of water scarcity. A number of petroglyphs are also scattered around the aqueduct and in surrounding caves. These symbols provide additional insight into the people who constructed the canals.

== Los Frailones ==
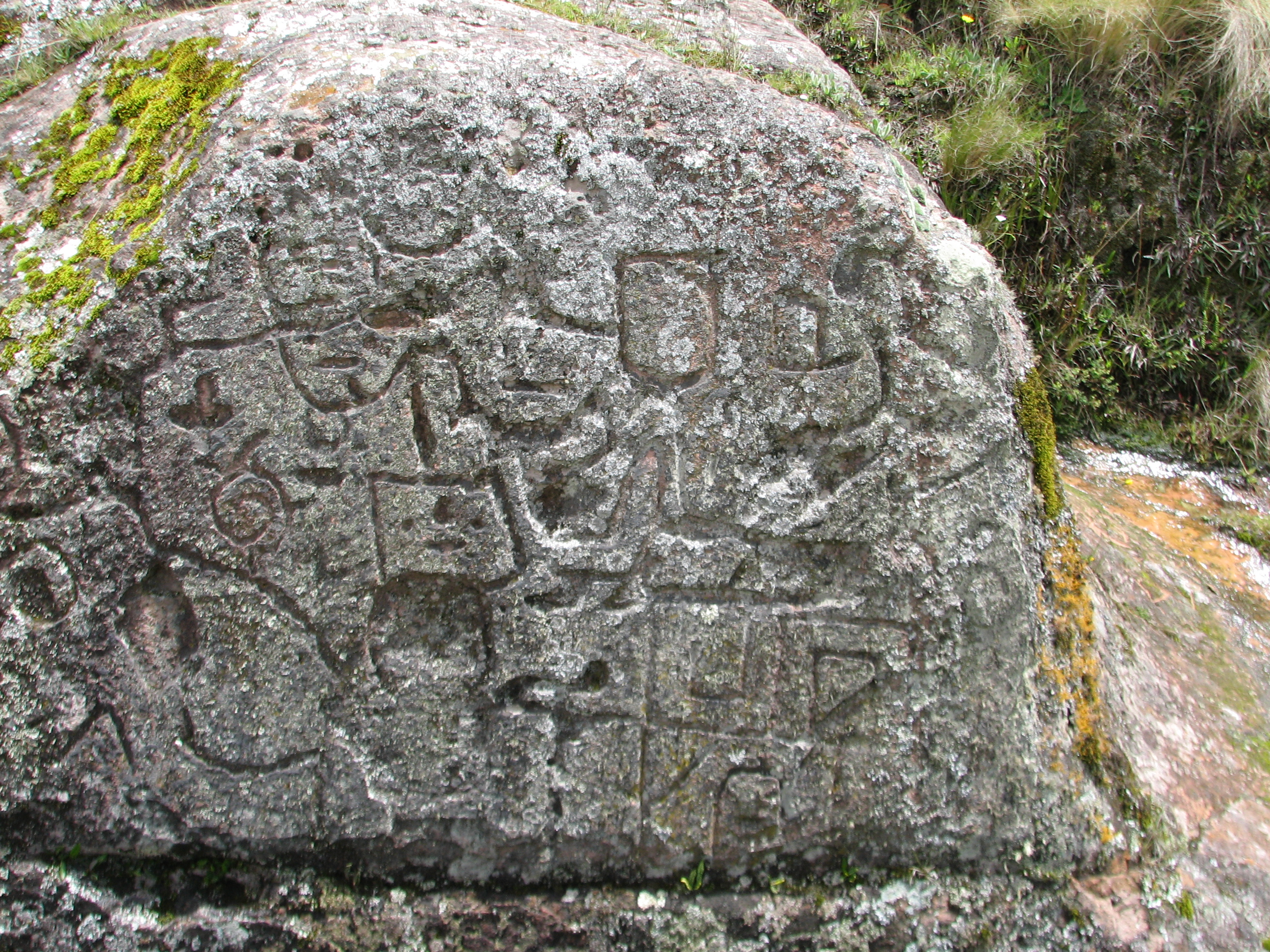
Cumbe Mayo petroglyphs

Los Frailones are massive volcanic pillars, some stretching as high as 60 feet (18 metres). The stone forests suddenly appear from the landscape, starkly contrasting the flat, grass-covered plains around Cajamarca. The erosive forces of wind and rain likely carved out the pillars.

Many of the pillars, carved by wind and rain have taken on new shapes, resembling hands and even animals, and allowing the mind to wander in the pristine Peruvian setting. Their impressive and rare geological formations, where some will identify the shapes of monks forming part of procession (hence the name frailones, Spanish for friars).

== See also ==
- Agricultural history of Peru
