= Guitarrero Cave =

Archaeological site in Peru

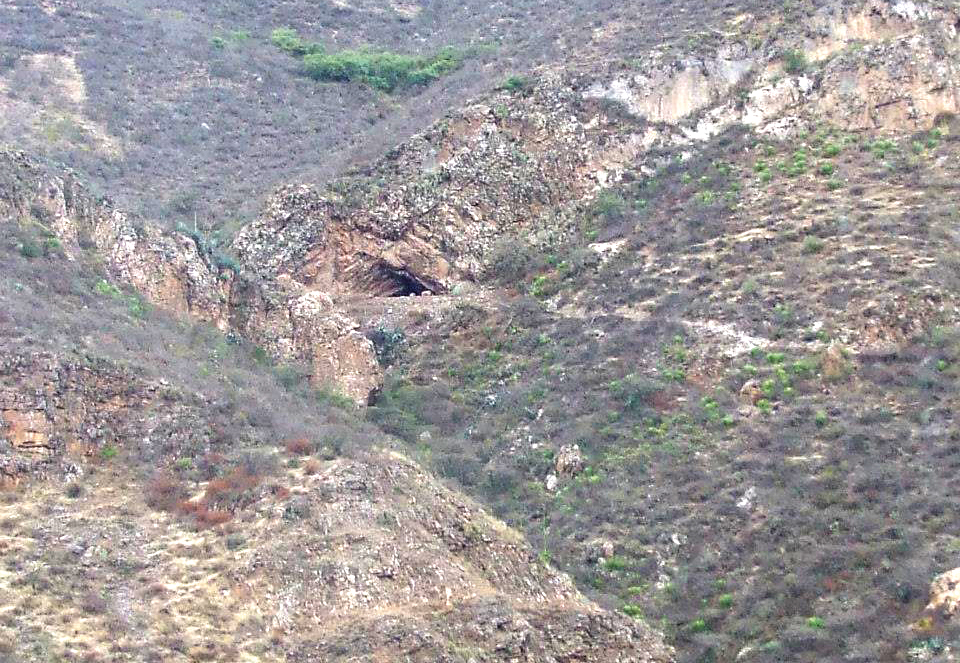
- Guitarrero Cave

- location in Peru
- 09.200573°S 77.709712°W
- Periods: Archaic, Early and Middle Horizon
- Location: Yungay Province, Ancash Region, Peru
- Region: Andes

Guitarrero Cave is located in the Callejón de Huaylas valley in Yungay Province, in the Ancash region of Peru. The cave stands 50 m (160 ft) above the Santa River and 2,580 m (8,460 ft) meters above sea level.

== Archeological findings ==
Guitarrero Cave has evidence of human use around 8,000 BCE and possibly as early as 10,560 BCE. A human's mandible and teeth found in the cave have been carbon dated to 10,610 BCE.

Above all that, there were a series of Archaic period campfires, dated between 8,500 and 7,000 BCE. Wood, bone, antler and fiber cordage were among the artifacts that were recovered from the level, as well as willow leaf, tanged, lanceolate, and concave base Ichuna/Arcata projectile points. A single grinding slab and a bone flesher were also recovered from this part of the area.

Levels were included in the Early and Middle Horizon occupations, cist tombs, and wall paintings between about the 1000 BCE to 1000 CE.

In the 1960s, archeologists discovered artifacts in an extraordinary state of preservation at the site. Remarkably, textiles, wood and leather tools, and basketry have been preserved intact. Some of the evidence of early domesticated Phaseolus beans, chili, corn and other cultivars have been argued for Guitarrero.

A high concentration of Trichocereus macrogonus pollen from the oldest phase of human occupation has been detected, as well as some fragments of cactus, which would testify to the intentional introduction of this plant inside the cave.

Fiberwork found in the cave dates back over ten-thousand years – the earliest found in South America. The cave held utilitarian containers made by twisting, looping, and knotting plant fibers.

The people of Guitarrero Cave are possible ancestors of the Chavín culture.

=== Cultigens ===
Some of the earliest cultivated plants in South America have been found in the cave. They include:

- Ají pepper (Capsicum baccatum): first appears at Guitarrero cave in 8,500 BCE
- Oca (Oxalis tuberosa): first appears 8,500–7,500 BCE
- Aji (Capsicum chinense): first appears 8,000–7,500 BCE
- Common bean (Phaseolus vulgaris): first appears 8,000–7,500 BCE
- Pallar bean (Phaseolus lunatus): first appears 8,000–7,500 BCE
- Lúcuma (Lucuma bifera): first appears 8,000–5,500 BCE
- Ulluku (Ullucus tuberosus): first appears 6,000 BCE at the cave es:Tres Ventanas in Peru, and next at Guitarrero cave 5,500 BCE.
- Zapallo (Cucurbita sp.): first appears 7,000 BCE
- Maize or corn (Zea mays): possibly first traces but not conclusively identified from 6,200 BCE. Maize has been identified in the Ayacucho Region of south central Peru as early as 4,400 and 3,100 BCE.

== See also ==
- Andean preceramic
