= Huayuri =

Archaeological site in Peru

- Location within Peru
- 14.53°S 75.27°W
- Type: ruins
- Location: Ica Region, Peru

History
- Built: c. 1100 CE
- Abandoned: c. 1530 CE

Huayuri, also called the Lost City of Huayuri, is a large pre-Columbian archaeological site which flourished from 1150 to 1450 CE in the Late Intermediate Period (1000 - 1476 CE) of Peru. Huayuri is located in the Peruvian coastal desert in Ica Region. Its prominence was probably dependent upon an climatic phase in which the area received greater precipitation than at earlier and later periods. The site may have been abandoned in the 16th century because of water shortages, conflict with the expanding Inca Empire, or epidemics of European diseases. The town (or city) of stone houses was located in a ravine between two mountain ridges, a location possibly dictated by a need for defense. Archaeological evidence indicates Huayari relied upon rainfall harvesting for its drinking water and some of the irrigated agriculture the town needed for the subsistence of the inhabitants.

== Description ==
Huayuri is located about 80 kilometres (50 miles) from the Pacific Ocean at an elevation of 500 metres (1,600 ft) in Santa Cruz District of Palpa Province in the Ica Region of Peru. The nearby Santa Cruz River is a tributary of the Rio Grande de Nazca River, the basin of which had been occupied for thousands of years by earlier cultures such as the Paracas and Nazca. A successor to those earlier desert cultures, the culture of Huayuri is called the Poroma by archaeologists. The ruins of Huayuri extend along a ravine between two flanking ridges for about 500 metres (1,600 ft) with a maximum width of the densely settled area of about 175 metres (574 ft). The ruins have an area of 7 hectares (17 acres). The entire site, including the terraced slopes which flank the ravine, has an area of about 20 hectares (49 acres). Among the ruins of dwellings are also enclosed compounds and storage facilities.

The ruins of Huayuri overlook the valley of the Santa Cruz River at a distance of about 1 kilometre (0.62 miles). The river valley is narrow in the immediate vicinity of Huayuri, but about a kilometer wide a few 100 metres (330 feet) upstream. The river is dry most of the year, partially due to the use of its water for irrigation.

The stone houses of Huayuri suggest that the inhabitants may have originated in the highlands because the coastal people of Peru customarily built in adobe while highland peoples built in stone. The location also suggests that the inhabitants wanted a defensible place to live and thus the settlement was located in a ravine, rather than in the nearby valley of the Santa Cruz River with its limited but more abundant water supply and cultivatable land. Huayuri was located along the north–south Inca road (which probably pre-dated the Incas) leading from the extensive irrigated lands of Ica to Nazca. Archaeologists have found evidence that llama caravans visited Huayuri during Inca times, although the llama is better adapted to higher elevations than the coastal desert.

== Climate change and rainfall harvesting ==
The desert coasts of southern Peru and northern Chile are extremely dry. Nazca, the nearest sizeable city to Huayuri, receives less than 25 millimetres (0.98 in) of precipitation annually and the region is nearly devoid of vegetation, except in river valleys and where irrigation is possible. Archaeologists, however, have found evidence that the climate was less arid in the Late Intermediate Period in which Huayuri flourished.

Geoarchaeological evidence points to a climate of the Huayari region during the Late Intermediate Period, with annual precipitation between 100 millimetres (3.9 in) to 200 millimetres (7.9 in). The higher precipitation permitted rainfall harvesting at Huayuri. For rainfall harvesting to be practical, there must be rainfall—which in later centuries is almost totally absent at Huayuri—and it must be fairly reliable. At Huayuri, a substantial infrastructure for harvesting rainfall is present. The water harvesting system at Huayuri was similar to the Khadin System used in the Thar Desert of India, as well as other locations around the world in dryland areas. The catchment area for water was the rocky upland around the settled area. Terraces were built into the hillsides and captured some rainfall. Additional water was captured and directed through channels and irrigation canals downhill onto a valley plain, enclosed at its bottom end by a bund or low dam. The captured water, its downhill path blocked by the bund, sank into the soil. Crops were planted in the area behind the bund without any additional irrigation. The soil was fertile because it was constantly renewed as the water deposited sediment and at the same time washed away harmful salts. Above and below the bund, rock-lined cisterns captured and preserved water which percolated down through the soil and was used for drinking and domestic use.

The importance of rainfall harvesting at Huayuri indicates climate change in the Peruvian desert and that the Late Intermediate Period received greater precipitation than the historic era after the Spanish conquest beginning in 1532. However, rainfall harvesting could not create enough agricultural land to sustain a large population. The catchment area for rainfall harvesting is 15 to 25 times larger than the land that can be rendered suitable for agricultural areas. Rainfall harvesting provided only 2.5 hectares (6.2 acres) of agricultural land, plus drinking water, to the inhabitants of Huayuri. Assuming that the population of Huayuri was as large as the extensive ruins indicate, most of the food for the population came from irrigated agriculture in the adjacent valley of the Santa Clara River or was imported from elsewhere.

== Abandonment ==
Huayuri reached its maximum population from 1150 CE to 1450 CE. Archaeological evidence indicates that rainfall harvesting began at Huayuri between 1260 and 1290 CE and became impractical in the 16th century, when the aridity of the region intensified and rainfall became extremely rare. Huayuri came under the influence or control of the Inca Empire in the 1470s and possibly was still occupied when the Spanish conquest of Peru began. Epidemics of European diseases, beginning in the 1520s and killing a large percentage of the Indigenous people of Peru, may have contributed to the abandonment of the site.
