= Tacarpo =

The Tacarpo is an agricultural traditional tool of the Peruvian Amazonía, of approximately 2 m long and 4 cm of diameter. It is made of the trunk or the branch of a tree of hard wood; one of its ends is cut to make a point.
