= Palpa District, Peru =

Coordinates: 14.5337°S 75.1852°W

Palpa
- District
- Interactive map of Palpa
- Country: Peru
- Region: Ica
- Province: Palpa
- Capital: Palpa

Government
  - Mayor: Carlos Enrique Rivas Rivas

Area
  - Total: 147.44 km^{2} (56.93 sq mi)
- Elevation: 347 m (1,138 ft)

Population (2005 census)
  - Total: 7,326
  - Density: 49.69/km^{2} (128.7/sq mi)
- Time zone: UTC-5 (PET)
- UBIGEO: 110401

Palpa District is one of five districts of the province, Palpa, in Peru.

== Climate ==
Climate data for Palpa, elevation 340 m (1,120 ft), (1991–2020)
Month	Jan	Feb	Mar	Apr	May	Jun	Jul	Aug	Sep	Oct	Nov	Dec	Year
Mean daily maximum °C (°F)	34.2 (93.6)	34.7 (94.5)	34.8 (94.6)	33.4 (92.1)	31.1 (88.0)	28.3 (82.9)	27.5 (81.5)	28.6 (83.5)	30.4 (86.7)	31.7 (89.1)	32.6 (90.7)	33.6 (92.5)	31.7 (89.1)
Mean daily minimum °C (°F)	19.2 (66.6)	19.9 (67.8)	18.9 (66.0)	16.3 (61.3)	12.4 (54.3)	9.9 (49.8)	8.2 (46.8)	8.2 (46.8)	9.8 (49.6)	11.8 (53.2)	13.2 (55.8)	16.6 (61.9)	13.7 (56.7)
Average precipitation mm (inches)	2.7 (0.11)	1.7 (0.07)	0.7 (0.03)	0.1 (0.00)	0.1 (0.00)	0.1 (0.00)	0.1 (0.00)	0.1 (0.00)	0.1 (0.00)	0.1 (0.00)	0.0 (0.0)	0.2 (0.01)	6 (0.22)
Source: National Meteorology and Hydrology Service of Peru
