= Tom Dillehay =

American anthropologist

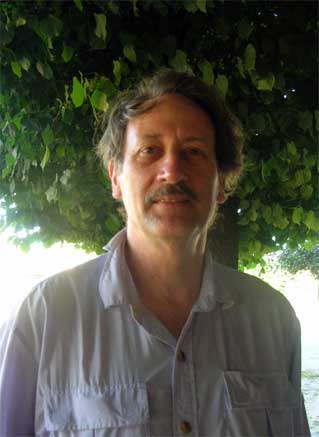
- Occupation: Archaeologist
- Known for: Monte Verde and Huaca Prieta

Academic background
- Education: University of Texas at Austin

Academic work
- Discipline: Archaeologist and anthropologist
- Sub-discipline: Pre-Columbian era
- Institutions: Vanderbilt University

Tom Dalton Dillehay (born 1948/1949) is an American anthropologist currently serving as the Rebecca Webb Wilson University Distinguished Professor of Anthropology, Religion, and Culture, as well as a Professor of Anthropology at Vanderbilt University. He has previously held teaching positions at the Universidad Austral de Chile and the University of Kentucky. He established anthropology departments at the Pontifical Catholic University of Chile in Temuco and at Austral University of Chile in Valdivia.

== Education ==
Dillehay received his advanced degrees in anthropology from the University of Texas at Austin.

== Career and research ==
In 1977, Dillehay became involved in the excavations at Monte Verde, a site in Chile where an early human settlement was discovered in 1975. Based on calibrated carbon 14 dates, Dillehay proposed that the remains found at Monte Verde are approximately 14,800 years old. This evidence, which suggests that the first humans arrived in the Americas around 15,000 years ago, challenges the "Clovis first" paradigm by indicating the possibility of an earlier human presence in South America. This proposal based on his research at Monte Verde met with virulent resistance within the field of archaeology, but was ultimately accepted two decades later.

Dillehay's work combines archaeology and ethnography. His excavations span eight countries, including the United States. Dillehay began excavating Huaca Prieta in 2007, where he found evidence that people had lived in that area between 13,300 and 14,200 years ago.

In addition to his archaeological work, Dillehay has conducted ethnographic research among the Mapuche people of southern Chile and the Jívaro community in northern Peru. His primary interest is exploring how ancient groups of foragers transitioned into settled societies.

Dillehay has published 32 books.

== Personal life ==
As of 2024, he lives in Santa Fe, New Mexico.

== Publications ==
- Dillehay, Thomas D. (2008). The Settlement of the Americas: A New Prehistory. Basic Books. ISBN 978-0-7867-2543-4.
- Dillehay, Tom D. (April 2007). Monuments, Empires, and Resistance: The Araucanian Polity and Ritual Narratives. Cambridge Studies in Archaeology. Cambridge University Press. ISBN 978-0521872621.
