= Toquepala Caves =

Archaeological site in Peru

Toquepala
- Location within Peru
- 17°18′16″S 70°43′05″W
- Type: Caves
- Location: Toquepala, Ilabaya, Tacna
- Region: Moquegua Region, Andes, Peru

Site notes
- Material: Sandstone
- Elevation: 2,200 m (7,200 ft)
- Length: 10 m (33 ft)
- Public access: Yes

Toquepala Caves are located near Toquepala mine, about 154 km (96 mi) from the city of Tacna, in the extreme southeast of Peru. They are notable for a number of rock paintings. The best known of them is the cave named Abrigo del Diablo ("Devil's rock face").

== Geography ==
Situated in the western Andes, they are in the Moquegua Region of the Osmore River. Located at an elevation of 2,200 m (7,200 ft) (2,800 m (9,200 ft) is also mentioned in another source), they are two small caves each 15 m × 5 m (49 ft × 16 ft) in size, with a depth of 5 m (16 ft). The two Toquepala Caves in the high Sierra are located near the Quebrada Cimarron or along the Rio Locumba, which is a dry stream flowing from the Sierra to the desert. The best known of the caves is "Abrigo del Diablo".

== History ==
The caves were seasonally occupied. The art attained its peak when the Collawa ethnic group lived here during the Paleolithic or Stone Age period. Archaeological research in the region revolved around the Asana site, as well as the Middle Horizon (500-1000AD) and the lower valley pre-Hispanic sites. Important archaic caves discovered in the Osmore River Basin were the Toquepala Caves. This cave became famous after copper was found in the valley and South Peru Copper Corporation started exploration of the Cuajone mines. The cave was studied in 1963 at the initiative of South Peru Copper Corporation. They found a large cache of artifacts during their mining operations and funded the study of the paintings in the caves by archeologists from Lima.) The team was led by Jorge C. Muelle, Director of the Museo Nacional de Arqueología, Antropología e Historia del Perú which resulted in the discovery of the rupestral art (drawings inscribed on rocks in the caves).

The detailed exploration of the caves was undertaken by Roger Ravines of the Museo Nacional de Arqueología, Antropología e Historia del Perú in 1965. Excavations from a pit dug to a depth of 1.8 metres (5 ft 11 in) was subject to radio carbon testing. The investigations revealed pre-ceramic habitation of the caves dated to 7,650 BC (10,000 BC is also mentioned). In one pit, remnants of paints along with brush wood were found at the same depth. He published his findings in 1965. During the investigations, a fence was erected around the caves to prevent intruders from vandalizing the rock paintings. In spite of this measure there were incidents of surreptitious entry to the caves in which some of the rock paintings were damaged. Since then stronger security fencing has been arranged.

== Features ==
The caves have rock art of gatherer-hunters who are inferred to have lived in the caves about 10,000 years ago. There are more than 50 rock paintings drawn by the inhabitants of the caves of the Palaeolithic age of which 30 were studied. These scenes depict armed people hunting the guanaco and Andean religious symbols. The figures drawn are of animals, predominantly guanacos (camelids). The scene depicted is of hunting by the humans who are corralling and killing a group of guanacos. The humans are in a posture of attacking the animals with axe, lances, and spear throwers. However, bow and arrow are not part of these scenes of rock art. They are painted in seven colours. Red was the dominant colour; yellow and green are also mentioned. The paint was made from hematite.

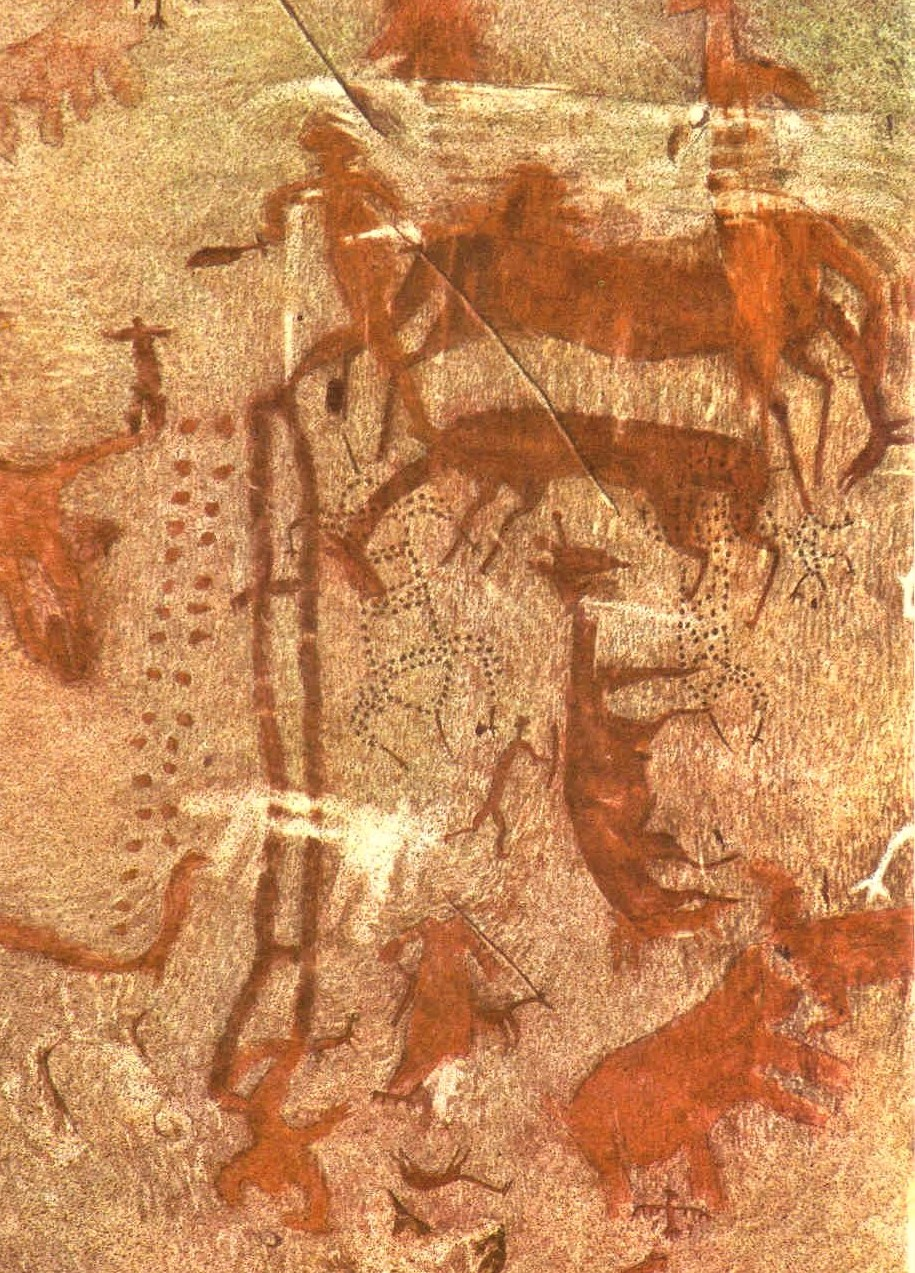
Photography of some of the cave art.

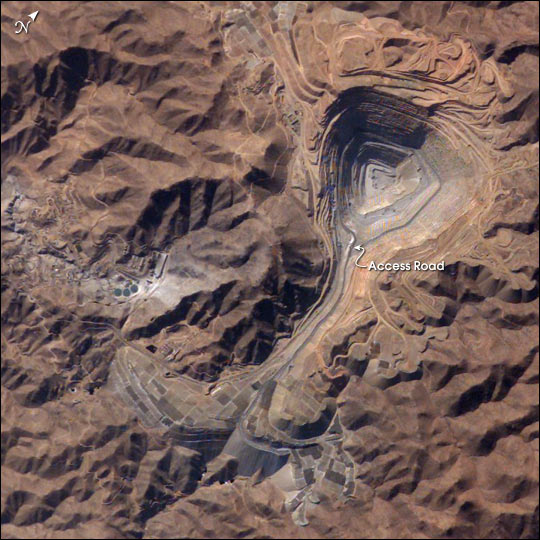
The Toquepala Mine is located near the caves

== See also ==
- Andean preceramic
- Art of the Upper Paleolithic
- List of Stone Age art

== Bibliography ==
- Aldenderfer, Mark S. (1998). Montane Foragers: Asana and the South-Central Andean Archaic. Iowa City: University of Iowa Press. ISBN 978-1-58729-474-7.
- Andrea, Alfred J. (2011). World History Encyclopedia. ABC-CLIO. ISBN 978-1-85109-930-6.
- Dillehay, Thomas D. (2008). The Settlement of the Americas: A New Prehistory. Basic Books. ISBN 978-0-7867-2543-4.
- Jenkins, Dilwyn (2009). The Rough Guide to Peru. Rough Guides. ISBN 978-1-4053-8165-9.
- Rice, Prudence M. (2011). Vintage Moquegua: History, Wine, and Archaeology on a Colonial Peruvian Periphery. University of Texas Press. ISBN 978-0-292-74254-3.
- Whitley, David S. (2001). Handbook of Rock Art Research. Rowman & Littlefield. ISBN 978-0-7425-0256-7.
