= Pernil Alto =

Archaeological site in Peru

- Location within Peru
- 14.494°S 75.21°W
- Type: ruins
- Location: Ica Region, Peru

History
- Built: c. 3800 BCE
- Abandoned: c. 3000 BCE

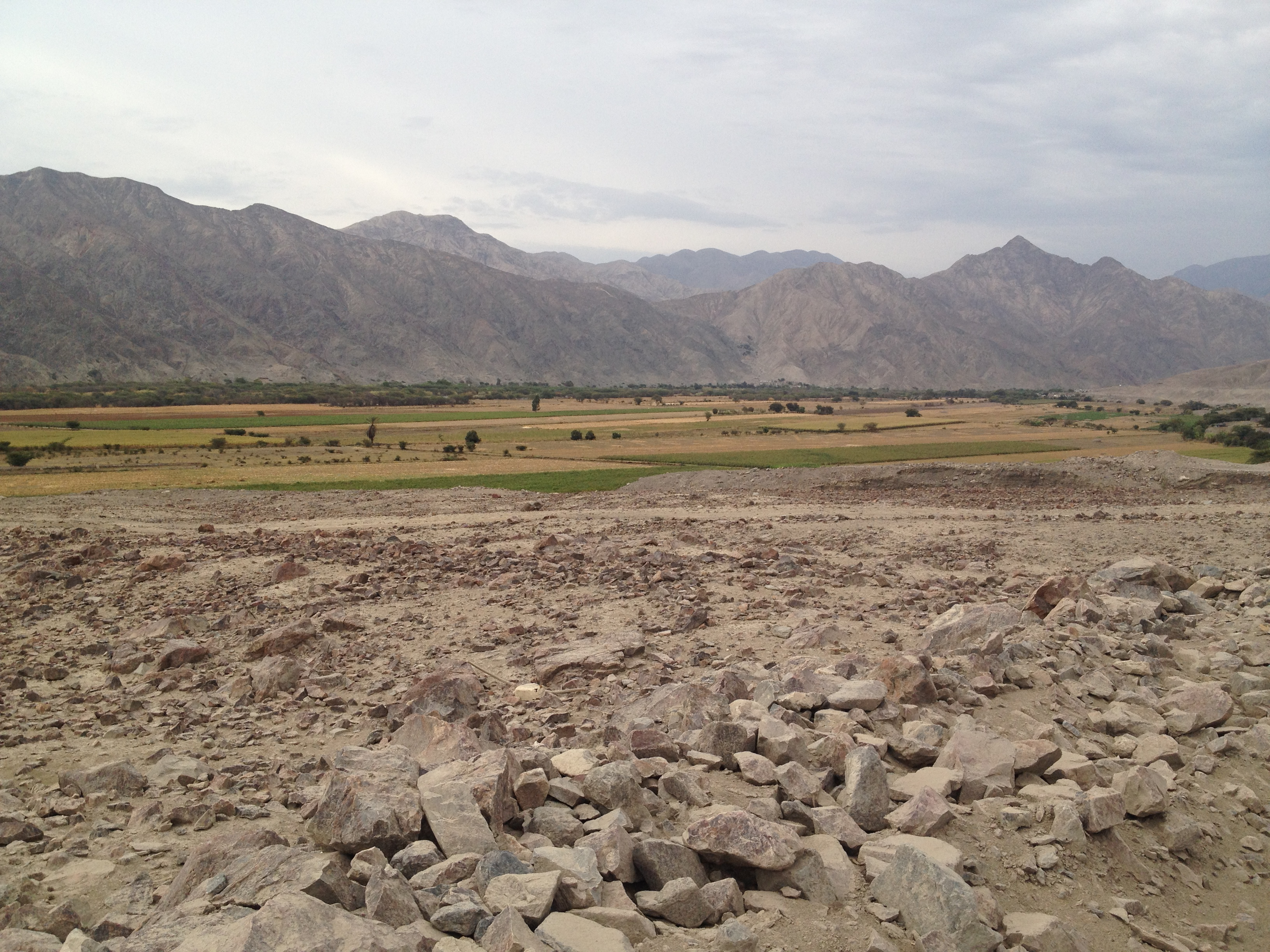
A panorama similar to the site of Pernil Alto: a low terrace rising above an irrigated valley with a river in the distance.

The Pernil Alto archaeological site is located in Rio Grande District of Palpa province in the Ica Region of Peru. Although the site was occupied earlier, archaeologists traced the adoption of agriculture by the inhabitants from about 3800 BCE to 3000 BCE (5800 to 5000 BP). The excavators cite radiocarbon dates which establish Pernil Alto as the oldest known inland and sedentary agricultural village in the Central Andes of Peru and Bolivia. The date at which agriculture became the main source of subsistence for the inhabitants of Pernil Alto was 3300 BCE.

== Description ==
Pernil Alto was discovered in 2001 by the German Archaeological Institute. The site is in the Andrean foothills about 60 kilometres (37 miles) from the Pacific Ocean and 50 kilometres (31 miles) from the high Andes. Pernil Alto is located on a terrace approximately 10 metres (33 ft) above the irrigated valley of the Rio Grande de Nazca River at an elevation of 400 metres (1,300 ft). This area in the 21st century is a desert, receiving less than 1 inch (25 mm) of precipitation annually. In 3000 BC the site was more favorable for agriculture, hunting, and foraging with an estimated annual precipitation of 200 millimetres (7.9 in) and vegetation consisting of sparse grassland and riparian forest.

The excavated site covers about 1,200 square metres (0.30 acres). Within that area were 18 dwellings, not all occupied simultaneously, consisting of semi-subterranean circular or oval huts measuring 2.5 metres (8.2 ft) to 3 metres (9.8 ft) in diameter along with associated fireplaces and storage pits. Archaeologists found 33 graves with the skeletons of 35 persons as well as artifacts made of stone, bone, wood, and straw, plus jewelry. The maximum population of Pernil Alto might have reached 50 persons. The artifacts found and the settlement pattern around an open plaza demonstrate that Pernil Alto became a sedentary village of year-round occupation rather than the scattered dwellings of a hamlet occupied by seasonal nomads.

== Adoption of agriculture ==
Botanical remains at the site were well-preserved due to the extreme aridity. The archaeologists traced the adoption of agriculture as the main source of subsistence by the inhabitants of Pernil Alto. They recovered the botanical remains of ten genera of edible plants. The most important wild food plant was a species of mesquite (Prosopis pallida) which produces edible beans and pods. The most important cultivated crops were sweet potatoes (Ipomoea batatas) and lima beans (Phaseolus lunatus). Other food crops cultivated were Canna (Canna indica), an edible root; beans (Phaseolus vulgaris); guava (Psidium guajava), a fruit; jack-beans (Canavalia); squash (Cucurbita); and Jicama (Pachyrhizus), an edible root. The people of Pernil Alto also cultivated the bottle gourd (Lagenaria siceraria) for use as vessels. The two most common food plants in the later history of Peru, maize and potatoes, were absent from the site. None of the food plants grown at Pernil Alto originated there, but were imported from agricultural cultures elsewhere.

The examination of botanical remains enabled the archaeologists to determine that in 3800 BCE more than 60 percent of the food consumed by the inhabitants of Pernil Alto was from wild plants. By 3000 BCE more than 70 percent of the food consumed was from cultivated plants. The cross-over point at which food from cultivated plants equaled the food from wild plants was about 3300 BCE. Over a period of about 800 years Pernil Alto had evolved from being a hamlet occupied by hunter-gatherers with limited agriculture to a village occupied by farmers who grew most of their food.

The village of Pernil Alto was abandoned in about 2900 BCE, possibly due to the Rio Grande River changing its course to a more distant part of the valley. The archaeologists claim that Pernil Alto is the "oldest hitherto known agricultural village of the Central Andes," although similar villages of equal or greater age may still be found in the Andes foothills. Older villages also existed near the Pacific coast of Peru, although they depended as much or more upon marine resources than agriculture.
