= Buena Vista, Peru =

Archaeological site in Peru

Coordinates: 11.730930°S 76.967903°W

The location of Buena Vista in Peru on the map.

Buena Vista is an 8 hectare (20 acre) archaeological site located in Peru about 25 miles inland in the Chillon River Valley and an hour's drive north of Lima, the capital. It is in the Santa Rosa de Quives District, Canta Province, in the foothills of the Andes. The site was first excavated by Frederic Engel (1987). He obtained radiocarbon dates of artifacts that pertained to the Early Preceramic Period (9700 ± 200 uncalibrated radiocarbon years before present), and to the Early Intermediate Period (1960 ± 80 uncalibrated radiocarbon years before present).

== Temple of the Fox ==
In June 2004, archaeologist Robert Benfer and his team discovered Buena Vista's most significant feature—the Temple of the Fox. It is named for the mural flanking the temple entrance, which depicts a fox curled up inside a llama. The Temple of the Fox dates back approximately 4200 years to a civilization that occupied the area a few millennia before the Inca. These ancient peoples had no writing system, and their name was not preserved; they are considered a late pre-ceramic culture and are believed to have followed the Kotosh religious tradition. Many archaeologists refer to them as the Andeans.

The "Menacing Disk," a mud sculpture at the Buena Vista archaeological site in Peru. It directly faces the sun at the winter solstice.

The temple complex measures 33 feet tall and 55 feet long. It is most notable for the astronomical observatory at its top, which is the oldest of its kind in the Americas; it predates records of similar artistic and scientific achievements of the region by 800 years. Large rocks placed on a ridge to the east of the observatory entrance served as a calendar. The most prominent rock marked the summer solstice—on that day each year, from the perspective of the temple, the sun would rise directly over the rock. In the hours just before dawn on the summer solstice, a constellation known as the fox rose between two other large rocks on the same ridge.

The temple's reverence to the fox, apparent in both the entrance mural and its astrological orientation, may provide clues to the purpose of the temple. Among many indigenous peoples of South America, the fox is a symbol of water and cultivation. Benfer hypothesizes that the ancient inhabitants of Buena Vista used the Temple of the Fox to appeal to their gods for good harvests on the summer solstice, which would have been planting time for the civilization. Researchers' discovery of the remains of plants and vegetables inside the temple's offering chamber has supported this theory.

The observatory is further distinguished by its sophisticated carvings, and a three-dimensional life-size sculpture of a musician, unique for a period known in that region for two-dimensional reliefs.

== Other ruins ==
The Buena Vista site as a whole includes ruins ranging in age from 10,000 years to fewer than 3,000 years ago. Besides the temple, the site encompasses a ceremonial center, stepped pyramids, and residences for the elites and for commoners. These buildings are from varying time periods, many of which were built later than the heyday of the temple. Most of these structures have been looted. The Temple of the Fox narrowly escaped looting as it was buried beneath several layers of earth.

== See also ==
- List of archaeoastronomical sites sorted by country
