= Huaca Prieta =

Archaeological site in Peru

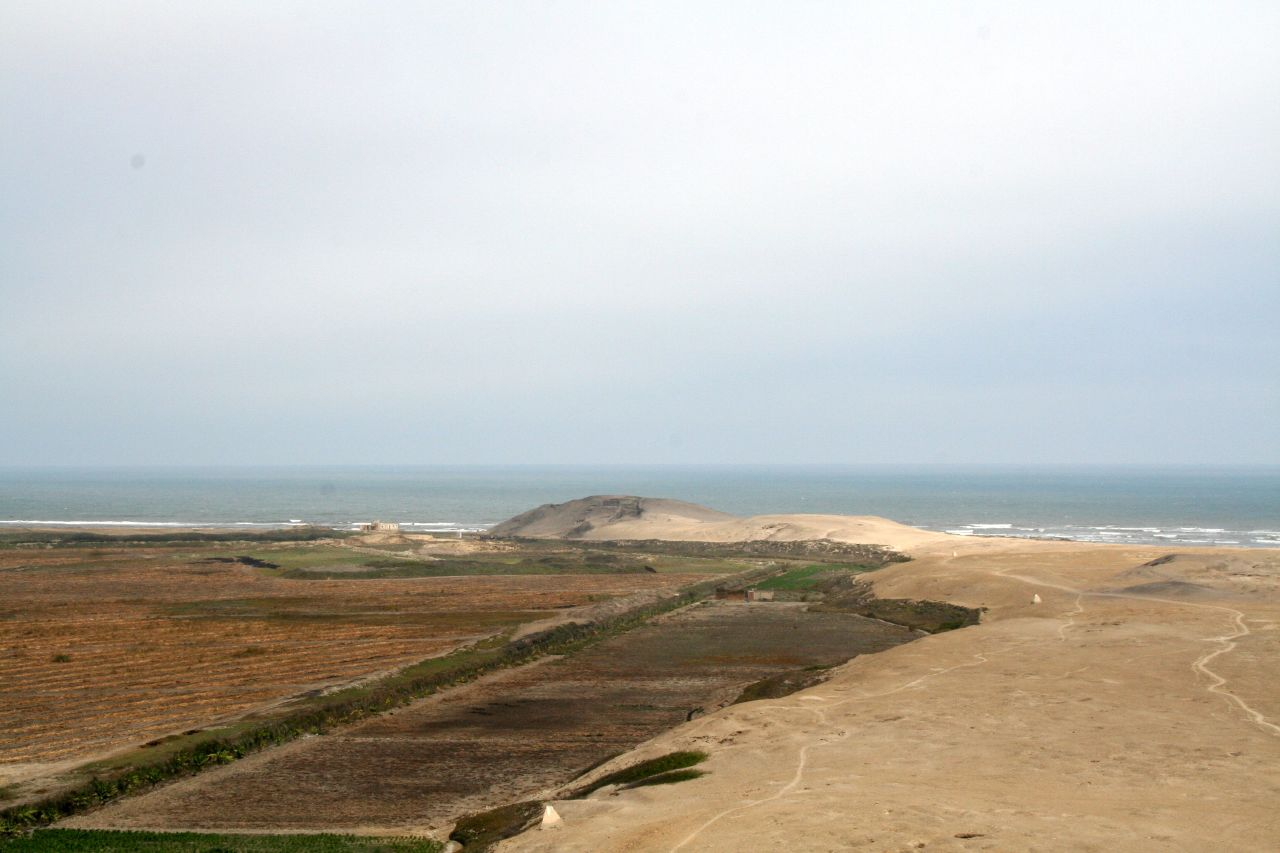
- Panoramic view of Huaca Prieta

- Location in Peru Huaca Prieta (South America)
- Interactive map of Huaca Prieta
- 7.924°S 79.307°W
- Type: settlement
- Periods: Andean preceramic
- Location: Magdalena de Cao District, Ascope province, La Libertad Region, Peru
- Region: Chicama Valley (northern Peru)
- Part of: El Brujo Archaeological Complex

History
- Built: c. 14500 BP
- Abandoned: c. 4000 BP

Site notes
- Archaeologists: Junius B. Bird
- Owner: Government of Peru
- Public access: Yes

Huaca Prieta is the site of an Andean preceramic settlement along the Pacific Ocean in the Chicama Valley, just north of Trujillo, La Libertad Province, Peru. It is a part of the El Brujo Archaeological Complex, which also includes sites of the Moche culture.

Huaca Prieta was occupied as early as 14,500 BP, long before ceramics were introduced. It consists of a huge mound of ash, stones, textiles, plants and shells, with some burials and constructions.

== Excavations ==
It was first excavated by Junius B. Bird in 1946–1947 who excavated three large test pits in or beside it. The remains, now at the American Museum of Natural History in New York City, include many examples of complex textiles made with twining techniques which incorporated intricate designs of mythological humans, condors, snakes and crabs. The many stone artifacts were not fancy—fish net weights, flakes and simple pebble tools; there were no projectile points. In the upper part of the mound there were many underground structures of unknown function, some with burials. They were made of cobblestones cemented with an ash-water mixture. The inhabitants fished, gathered shellfish, and grew fruit, gourds, squash, peppers, beans, tubers and, importantly, cotton.

There is a low mound 70–170 m to the north (now called Monticulo Cupisnique) where Bird excavated three test pits. He found many ruins and much refuse, including ceramics of the Guañape, Early Cupisnique and Cupisnique cultures. The last is linked to the highland Chavín culture. A large tsunami damaged both mounds leaving a thick layer of cobblestones just north of the preceramic mound, at about 850 BCE, between the two Cupisnique phases.

The end of Huaca Prieta's occupation came gradually. It fell into disuse as the economy changed to being more agriculture-based, and its ceremonial significance diminished. Other nearby mounds supplanted Huaca Prieta in importance, such as Paredones and El Brujo.

== Lithic technologies ==
The earliest occupational levels of Huaca Prieta have been examined in 2017. These are the levels dated to 15,000-8000 BP. They indicate only an occasional and intermittent human presence before the ceremonial mound was built. The stone artifacts are characterised by minimally worked unifacial stone tools. Such tools are also characteristic of some other similarly dated sites in South America. The absence of fishhooks and harpoons has also been noted at these levels.

It is likely that those early occupants engaged primarily in simple food gathering along the shoreline, as well as in trapping and clubbing abundant local species of animals.

Bifacial stone tools or projectile points were absent in those levels. According to the authors,

"we have examined more than 1 million lithic tools and debris ... and we have not yet documented a single bifacial implement. It is our opinion that the early cultural periods under discussion for this section of the north coast of Peru were exclusively characterized by unifacial lithic assemblages. The absence of evidence for stone, bone, and shell harpoons and the absence of shell fishhooks are also significant."

=== Unifacial stone tools ===
Several other sites in the Americas featuring only unifacial stone tools at early occupational levels are also known. In particular, the Amotape complex of the northern coast of Peru (9,000-7,100 BCE) is notable. This cultural complex, as well as the Siches area (in north Peru, close to the Ecuador border), share similar developments as Huaca Prieta.

The Itaparica tradition in central-northwestern Brazil, dated between 11,000 and 10,000 BP, is believed to be totally unifacial. It is associated with a rapid population density increase in Brazil at that time.

The San Dieguito complex of Southern California, the Southwestern United States, and northwestern Mexico (as early as 10,200 BP) also featured predominantly unifaces.

Also relevant is Tibitó, in the mountains of Colombia, which has been carbon dated to 11,740 BP.

Monte Verde II in southern Chile, dating 14,000 cal BP or earlier, is also predominantly unifacial.

In North America, early unifacial assemblages are quite commonly found along with bifacial assemblages. Such sites as Gault and the nearby Friedkin sites in Texas, Cactus Hill in Virginia, and Paisley Cave in Oregon are notable. All of them are also dated before 14,000 cal BP.

== Early maize found ==
Until recently, it was believed that maize was introduced to the region rather late, after the tsunami.

In 2012, it was reported that corncobs found at two ancient sites in Peru (Paredones and Huaca Prieta) may date from as early as 4700 BCE. This suggests that people living along the coast of northern Peru were already eating corn by that time.

These results were reported by Dolores Piperno, and other scientists from Washington's National Museum of Natural History. This is the earliest maize discovered so far in South America.

According to archaeologist Tom D. Dillehay, several varieties of early corn have been discovered here.

"Most notably, Dillehay's team found the world's earliest-known collection of corn macroremains (e.g., stalks and cobs), which included all early varieties of the plant—ceremonial popcorn, corn used for chicha beer, flour corn, and corn for foraging animals."

This suggests that Huaca Prieta was an important hub in a large trading network reaching all the way to Mexico, where domesticated corn originated.

== Earliest evidence of avocado ==
A team of scientists excavating Huaca Prieta between 2007 and 2013 also discovered evidence of the avocado dating back perhaps 15,000 years. It had been thought previously that the avocado originated in the area of Puebla, Mexico, some 8,000 years ago.

== Early use of cotton and indigo dye ==
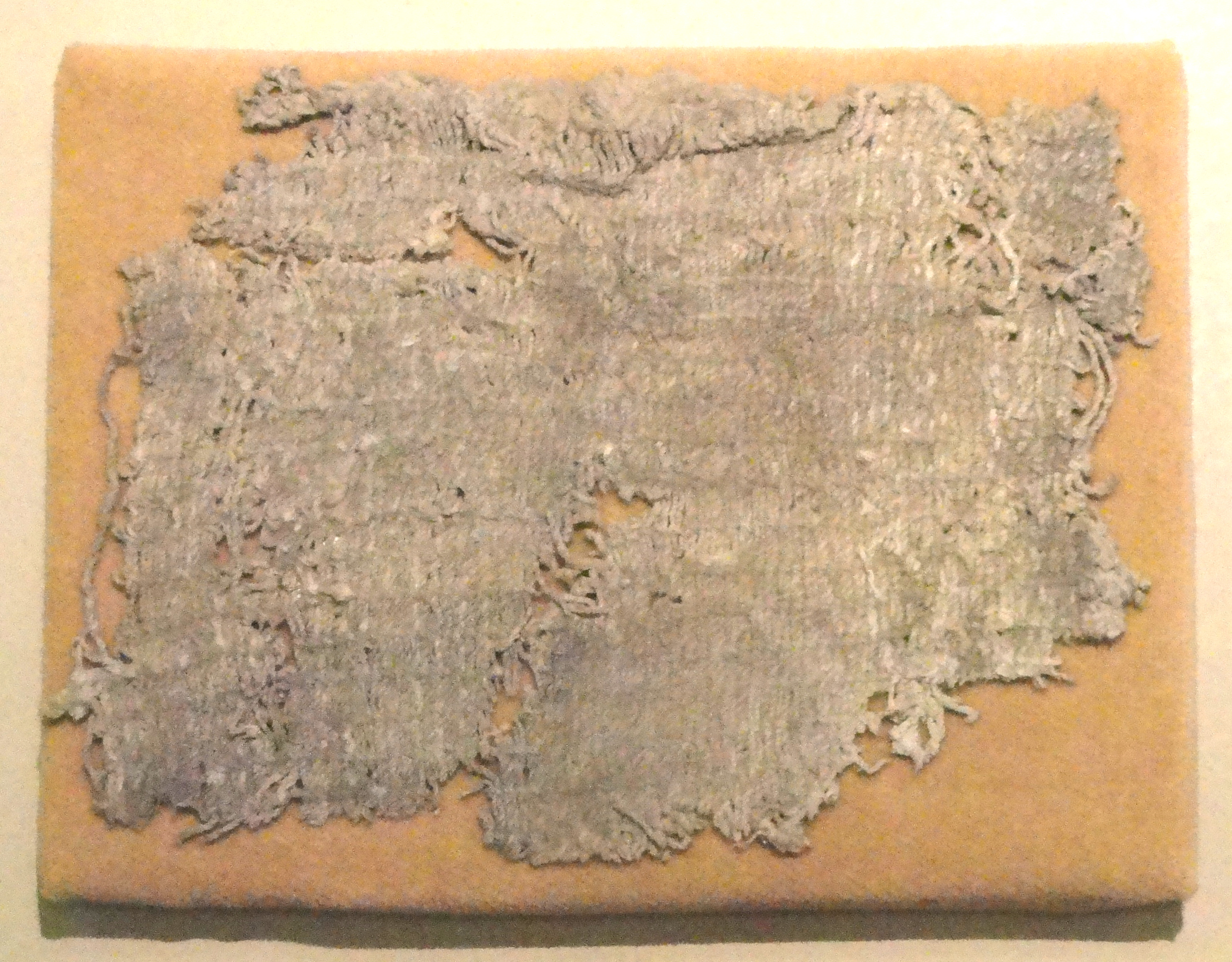
Cotton cloth fragment from Huaca Prieta, 2500 BCE - American Museum of Natural History, New York

In 2016, 6000-year-old dyed cotton fabric was discovered at the Preceramic site of Huaca Prieta. This marks the earliest recorded use of cotton worldwide. Gossypium barbadense may have been domesticated in the region.

Analysis of the pigment used on the cloth identified it as indigotin, an indigoid dye. This marks the earliest recorded use of indigo dye to date, predating the use of indigo in Egypt's Fifth Dynasty by about 1,500 years.

== See also ==
- Andean preceramic
- Norte Chico civilization
- Cupisnique culture
- Huaca Ventarron

== Literature ==
- Dillehay, Tom D.; Bonavia, Duccio; Goodbred, Steve L.; Pino, Mario; Vásquez, Victor; Tham, Teresa Rosales (2017). "A late pleistocene human presence at Huaca Prieta, Peru, and early Pacific Coastal adaptations". Quaternary Research. 77 (3): 418–423. doi:10.1016/j.yqres.2012.02.003. ISSN 0033-5894. S2CID 128629096.
