= Chivateros =

Prehistoric stone tool quarry in Peru

- Chivateros
- Location in Peru
- 11°56′54″S 77°3′39″W
- Periods: Andean preceramic
- Associated with: Hunter-gatherers
- Location: Chillón valley
- Region: Ventanilla District

History
- Built: c. 12,000 BCE
- Abandoned: c. 6,000 BCE

Site notes
- Length: 35 m (115 ft)
- Excavation dates: 1963, 1966, 1970
- Archaeologists: Thomas C. Patterson, Edward P. Lanning, Claude Chauchat

Chivateros is a prehistoric stone tool quarry and associated workshop located near the mouth of the Chillón river in the Ventanilla District, northwest of Lima, Peru.

== Archaeological site ==
Excavations were led in 1963 and 1966 by archaeologists Thomas C. Patterson and Edward P. Lanning, who noticed three cultural assemblages in the Chillón valley and uncovered large quantities of debris of lithic artifact production, initially interpreted as lithic instruments (hand axes, spearheads, scrapers, etc.).

In an area of coastal lomas (areas of fog-watered vegetation), excavations revealed a lithic flake industry as early as the Late Pleistocene, dating between 9,000 and 11,000 years ago. Wood fragments helped define a Chivateros I period of 9500-8000 BC. There is also a red zone with some flint chips which, by comparison of artifacts of the nearby Oquendo workshop, dates to pre-10,500 BC.

The whole industry is characterized by burins and bifaces with the upper-level (Chivateros II) containing long, keeled, leaf-shaped projectile points which resemble points from both Lauricocha II and El Jobo. Dating has been aided by the deposition of both loess and salt crust layers which suggest alternating periods of dryness and humidity and which can be synchronized with glacial activity in the Northern Hemisphere.

For a long time it was mistakenly regarded as the greatest lithic workshop in Peru, when in reality it is a large area of canteo, that is to say, a place or quarry where groups of hunter-gatherers, or paijanenses, obtained the raw material they used to make pedunculated points, known as Paijanense or Paiján points. The inhabitants of this area have been given the name "Chivateros".

Exploration of the site's vicinity, the area near the mouth of the Chillon River and the desert around Ancon, has revealed a large settlement complex of ancient hunter-gatherers near the quarries and associated workshops. Among them are Cerro Chivateros, Cerro Oquendo and La Pampilla.

The stratigraphic sequence:

- Red Zone (12,000 - 10,500 BC)
- Oquendo (10,500 - 9,500 BC)
- Chivateros I (9,500 - 8,000 BC)
- Chivateros II (8,000 - 6,000 BC)

Chivateros was dated by samples of non-carbonized wood associated with the final phase of Chivateros I. Subsequent surveys by French archaeologist Claude Chauchat in the 1970s found similar Chivateros sites in Cupisnique, which he was able to link with workshops producing stemmed Paijanense tips with a dating going back to the eighth millennium BC. It is possible that sites on the north coast, of the Chivateros type, date back to the tenth millennium BC.

== Quarry operations ==
Chivateros was initially defined as a gigantic lithic workshop of the Paleolithic. Patterson and Lanning identified lithic pieces made of quartzite, such as knives, scrapers, arrowheads and hand axes. Moreover, they established a factual differentiation between what they called Chivateros I and Chivateros II, establishing equivalents in other points of America.

Thanks to the works of Chauchat in Cupisnique and Chicama, this interpretation has largely been superseded. Chauchat determined that Chivateros was actually a quarry, and that there was not only one site of this type, but many Chivateros sites, for much of the Peruvian coast and Yungas (which have been dubbed as Chivateros quarries), where groups of hunter-gatherers were extracting raw material, which they took to workshops located nearby or closer to their homes.

The most widely known material of these quarries are the Chivateros preforms (erroneously described by Lanning as "handaxes" and "spearheads"), which were the first outline of pedunculate points. The rest of lithic materials are nothing more than waste from the activity of carving and edging.

The people who obtained raw material from Chivateros lived in Piedras Gordas and Carabayllo.There Lanning found their workshops and housing areas, which he called the Lítico Light Complex. Chivateros type arrow heads and blades were made there, of the Paijanense type. This tradition spread along the Peruvian coast from Lambayeque to Ica during the period between 10,000 BC to 6000 BC.

== Current status ==
Since its discovery in the 1960s, Chivateros was constantly plundered by collectors, academics and the general population to obtain lithic artifacts. In spite of its importance, the Peruvian government never undertook any plan to care for the site. Subsequently, the activity of private companies and the illegal occupation of land by traffickers has destroyed most of the archaeological site.

== See also ==
- Paiján culture

== Bibliography ==
- Richard W. Keatinge (10 March 1988), Peruvian Prehistory - An Overview of Pre-Inca and Inca Society, Cambridge University Press, pp. 45–, ISBN 978-0-521-27555-2.
- Karen Olsen Bruhns (4 August 1994), Ancient South America, Cambridge University Press, pp. 53–, ISBN 978-0-521-27761-7.
- Sigfried J. de Laet (1994), History of Humanity - Prehistory and the beginnings of civilization, Taylor & Francis, pp. 344–, ISBN 978-92-3-102810-6.
- Cardich, Augusto; Origen del hombre y de la cultura andinos - Tomo I de la Historia del Perú, pp. 108–109, Lima, Editorial Juan Mejía Baca, 1982, Cuarta edición, ISBN 84-499-1606-2.
- Kaulicke, Peter; "El Perú Antiguo I (9000 a.C.-200d.C.) Los periodos arcaico y formative", Tomo primero de la Historia del Perú, Empresa Editora El Comercio S.A., Lima, 2010, ISBN 978-612-4069-86-4.
- Tauro del Pino, Alberto; Enciclopedia Ilustrada del Perú, Tercera Edición, Tomo 4, CAN/CHO, Lima, PEISA, 2001, ISBN 9789972401497.
- Silva Sifuentes, Jorge E. T.; « Origen de las civilizaciones andinas ». Incluida en la Historia del Perú, p. 50, Lima, Lexus Editores, 2000, ISBN 9972-625-35-4.
