= Moche culture =

Culture that flourished 100 to 800 AD in Peru

Moche culture Moche
- 100 CE–800 CE
- A map of Moche cultural influence
- Status: Culturally united independent polities
- Capital: Moche
- Common languages: unknown, probably Mochica
- Religion: Polytheist
- Historical era: Early Intermediate
  - Established: 100 CE
  - Disestablished: 800 CE
Preceded by	Succeeded by
Chavín culture	Wari culture; Sican culture
- Today part of: La Libertad and Lambayeque Department, Peru

The Moche civilization (Spanish pronunciation: [ˈmotʃe]; alternatively, the Moche culture or the Early, Pre- or Proto-Chimú) flourished in northern Peru from about 100 to 800 AD, during the Regional Development Epoch. The capital of a Southern Moche polity was near present-day Moche, Trujillo, Peru, with several other, possibly independent, regions under Moche influence.

Many scholars contend that the Moche were not politically organized as a monolithic empire or state. Rather, they were likely a group of autonomous polities that shared a common culture, as seen in the rich iconography and monumental architecture that survives today.

== Background ==
Moche society was agriculturally based, with a significant level of investment in the construction of a sophisticated network of irrigation canals for the diversion of river water to supply their crops. Their artifacts express their lives, with detailed scenes of hunting, fishing, fighting, sacrifice, sexual encounters, and elaborate ceremonies. Moche ceremonies were commonly associated with movement, but "stasis" and standing still were also very significant. These pauses were shown in "liminal spaces", which were in-between spaces like sunken steps or ramps. The Moche are particularly noted for their elaborately painted ceramics, gold work, monumental constructions (huacas), and irrigation systems.

Moche history may be broadly divided into three periods: the emergence of the Moche culture in Early Moche (100–300 AD), the expansion and flourishing during Middle Moche (300–600 AD), and the urban nucleation and subsequent collapse in Late Moche (500–800 AD).

The Salinar culture reigned on the north coast of Peru from 200 BC–200 AD. According to some scholars, this was a short transition period between the Cupisnique and the Moche cultures.

There are considerable parallels between Moche and Cupisnique iconography and ceramic designs, including the iconography of the "Spider god".

=== Moche cultural sphere ===
The Moche cultural sphere is centered on several valleys on the north coast of Peru in the regions of La Libertad, Lambayeque, Jequetepeque, Chicama, Moche, Virú, Chao, Santa, and Nepena. It occupied 250 miles of desert coastline and up to 50 miles inland.

The Huaca del Sol, a pyramidal adobe structure on the Rio Moche, was the largest pre-Columbian structure in Peru. It was partly destroyed when Spanish Conquistadors looted its graves for gold in the 16th century. The nearby Huaca de la Luna is better preserved, with many of its interior walls still filled with many colorful murals and complex iconography. The site has been under professional archaeological excavation since the early 1990s.

Other major Moche sites include Sipán, Loma Negra, Dos Cabezas, Pacatnamu, the El Brujo complex, Mocollope, Cerro Mayal, Galindo, Huanchaco, and Pañamarka.

Their adobe huacas have been mostly destroyed by looters and natural forces over the last 1,300 years. The surviving ones show that the coloring of their murals was quite vibrant.

== Southern and Northern Moche ==
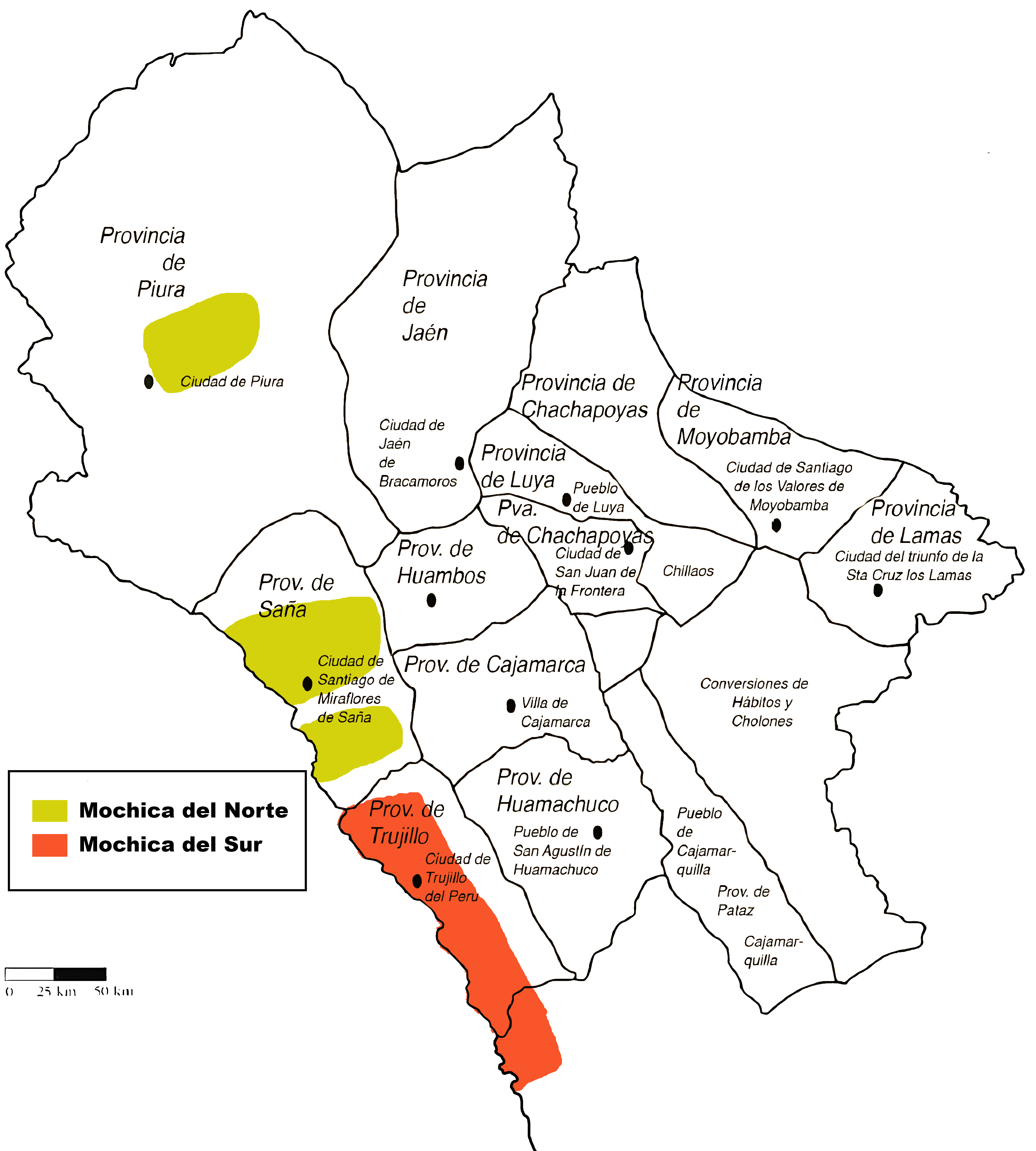
Map of the region of the Bishopric of Trujillo shows the two different Mochica cultures.

Two distinct regions of the Moche civilization have been identified, Southern and Northern Moche, with each area probably corresponding to a different political entity. In the past, Moche was thought to be one single culture, region, and state system. The idea of the Moche being two separate regions came to be through studying changes in Moche pottery over time. This concept was proposed by Rafael Larco Hoyle, who is the founder of current Moche studies, and it was so widely accepted that for many years, only a small number of radiocarbon analyses were done for the Moche.

The Southern Moche region, believed to be the heartland of the culture, originally comprised the Chicama and Moche valleys, and was first described by Rafael Larco Hoyle. The Huaca del Sol-Huaca de la Luna site was probably the capital of this region. There is a large mural of warriors and prisoners at the Huaca de La Luna that changes direction when it reaches a building in the plaza called the "recinto 1". When the mural reaches recinto 1, the figure turns 90 degrees and starts moving along a different wall. This is considered a "liminal space". Recinto 1 was a building that sat on a raised platform in the plaza and was decorated very elaborately. The Northern Moche region includes three valley systems:

- The upper Piura Valley, around the Vicús culture region
- The lower Lambayeque Valley system, consisting of three rivers: La Leche, Reque and Zaña
- The lower Jequetepeque Valley system

The Piura was fully part of the Moche phenomenon only for a short time—during its Early Moche, or Early Moche-Vicús phase—and then developed independently.

It appears that there was a lot of independent development among these various Moche centers (except in the eastern regions). They all likely had ruling dynasties of their own, related to each other. Centralized control of the whole Moche area may have taken place from time to time, but appears infrequent.

Pampa Grande, in the Lambayeque Valley, on the shore of the Chancay River, became one of the largest Moche sites anywhere, and occupied an area of more than 400 hectares. It was prominent in the Moche V period (600–700 AD), and features an abundance of Moche V ceramics.

The site was laid out and built in a short period of time and has an enormous ceremonial complex. It includes Huaca Fortaleza, which is the tallest ceremonial platform in Peru.

San Jose de Moro is another northern site in the Jequetepeque valley. It was prominent in the Middle and Late Moche Periods (400–850 AD). Numerous Moche tombs have been excavated here, including several burials containing high status female individuals. These women were depicted in Moche iconography as the Priestess. Three types of burial can be found at this site. They include boot-shaped tombs, chamber tombs, and simple graves. The chamber tombs were saved for elites, including priestesses and they often held multiple people.

=== Differences between the Northern Mochicas and the Southern Mochicas ===
The best known differences are:

	Northern Mochica	Southern Mochica
Goldsmithing	Yes	No
Huacos portraits	No	Yes
Buildings with ramp	Yes	No
Larco 5-Phase Ceramic Sequence	No	Yes
Great and wide valleys	Yes	No
Archaeological heirs	Sicanes	Chimus

== Material culture ==
=== Ceramics ===
Moche pottery is some of the most varied in the world. Pottery has been the distinguishing feature of the Moche culture for many reasons. It is known for being highly decorated and standardized and led people to believe the Moche had been part of a corporate state system. The use of mold technology is evident, which would have enabled the mass production of certain forms. But Moche ceramics vary widely in shape and theme, with most important social activities documented in pottery, including war, agriculture, metalwork, weaving, and erotica. Specifically, the architectural vessels, which are pots that resemble buildings. They also include elites and warriors.

Traditional north coast Peruvian ceramic art uses a limited palette, relying primarily on red and white colors, fineline painting, fully modeled clay, veristic figures, and stirrup spouts. Moche ceramics created between 150 and 800 AD epitomize this style. Moche pots have been found not just at major north coast archaeological sites, such as Huaca de la luna, Huaca del sol, and Sipán, but also at small villages and unrecorded burial sites as well. Common types of pottery in Moche burials included floreros, cántaros, stirrup spout bottles, and cancheros. Single and stirrup-spout bottles are not shaped in a practical manner for pouring or filling with liquid. The only confirmed purpose of these ceramics is grave goods.

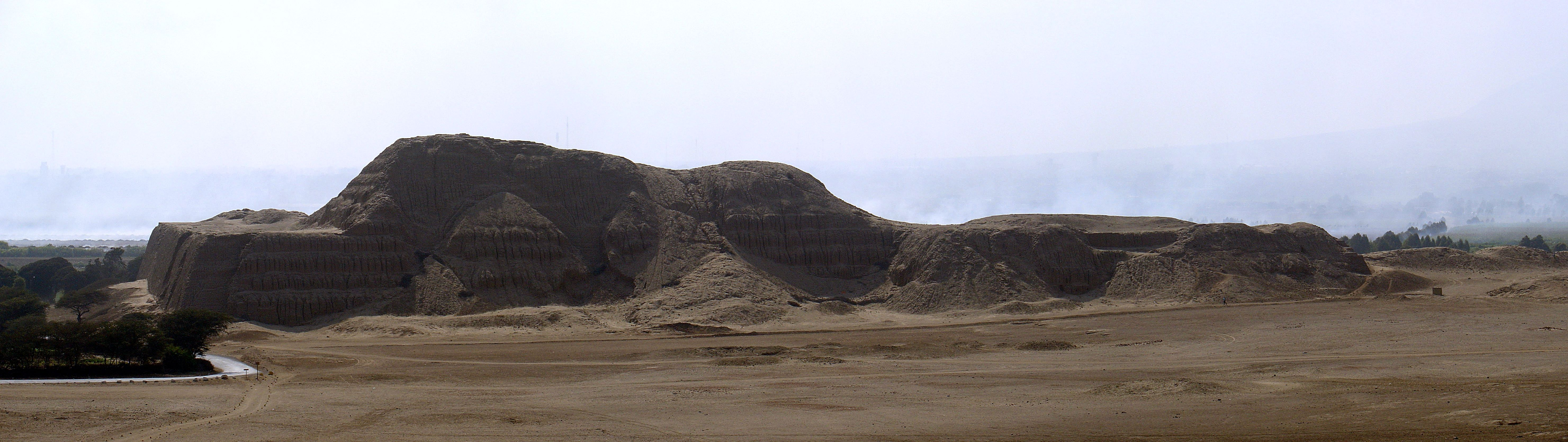
Huaca del Sol (Temple of the Sun), Moche cultural capital, 4 km (2 mi) south of the modern city of Trujillo

At least 500 Moche ceramics have sexual themes. The most frequently depicted act is anal sex, with scenes of vaginal penetration being very rare. Most pairs are heterosexual, with carefully carved genitalia to show that the anus, rather than the vagina, is being penetrated. Often an infant is depicted breastfeeding while the couple has sex. Fellatio is sometimes represented, but cunnilingus is absent. Some depict male skeletons masturbating, or being masturbated by living women.

External videos
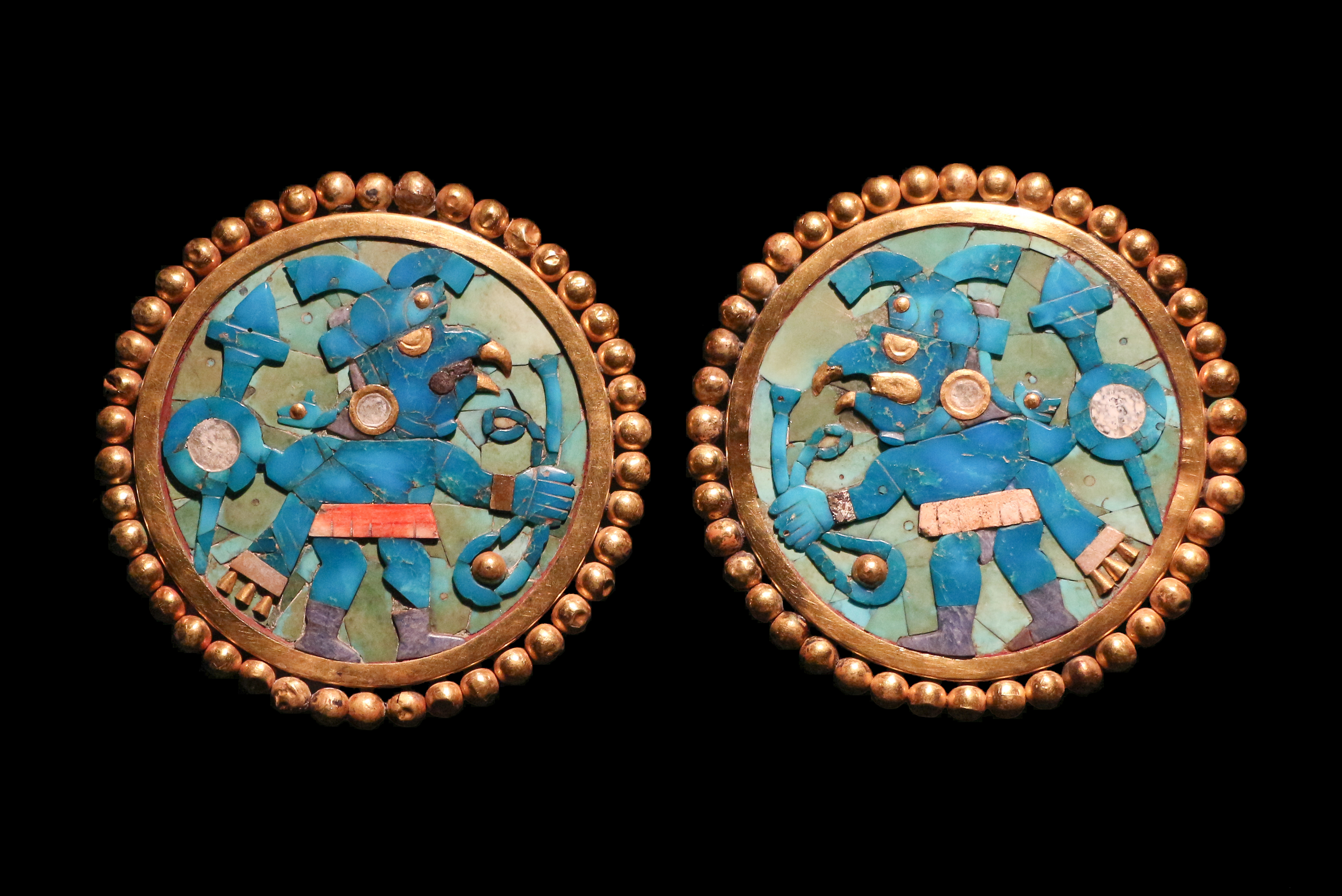
- Pair of Earflares, Winged Messengers (Moche Culture, Peru), Smarthistory
- Moche Portrait Head Bottle, Smarthistory

Because irrigation was the source of wealth and foundation of the empire, the Moche culture emphasized the importance of circulation and flow. Expanding upon this, Moche artwork frequently depicted the passage of fluids, particularly life fluids through vulnerable human orifices. There are countless images of defeated warriors losing life fluids through their nose, or helpless victims getting their eyes torn out by birds or captors.

The coloration of Moche pottery is often simple, with yellowish cream and rich red used almost exclusively on elite pieces. White and black are rarely used. The Moche are known for their portraiture pottery. The pottery portraits created by the Moche appear to represent actual individuals. Many of the portraits are of individuals with physical disfigurements or genetic defects. Some pottery represented animals, such as a pot with foxes running up a spiral ramp. The foxes are flat paintings, but the rungs of the spiral ramp are made of small, three-dimensional sculpted snails.

The realistic detail in Moche ceramics may have helped them serve as didactic models. Older generations could pass down general knowledge about reciprocity and embodiment to younger generations through such portrayals. The sex pots could teach about procreation, sexual pleasure, cultural and social norms, a sort of immortality, the transfer of life and souls, transformation, and the relationship between the two cyclical views of nature and life.

=== Textiles ===
Extreme weather and fragility of garments mean that relatively few examples of Moche textiles exist. However, limited quantities have been found in tombs, especially of higher-status members of society. Many of the remaining garments are incomplete articles, partially broken down. Nevertheless, scholars have been able to gain cultural insights from the remaining Moche textiles. The Moche wove textiles, mostly using cotton and wool from vicuña and alpaca. The relative presence of these fabrics, as well as which patterns were used, varies chronologically throughout Moche culture. Too few relics exist from early Moche culture to draw conclusive findings. Textiles from around 450 AD uniquely include a male head cloth—which is not readily found elsewhere. Twill and gauze weaving is also common among samples from this period, though by the 500-800 AD range, these patterns become much less abundant. It is thought that elite members of Moche society had specialized artisans who manufactured their textiles, whereas lower-ranking typical members of society would manufacture their own clothing. Whorls and needles have proven quite common in excavation of Moche dwellings—pointing to a household level of production. However, more monochrome, homogenized relics suggest mass-production may have become more common by 500-800 AD. Variation in garments likely correlates with different social classes. Sophisticated weaving techniques and bright dyes are more common on elites' clothing, whereas commoners may have had garments that were less sophisticated and lacked dye—and they likely had fewer of them. Complex tapestries developed by artisans are another good associated with high social hierarchy. Several specific items also correlate to gender in Moche culture, such as a head cloth for men and a long tunic for women. Foreigners to the Moche Culture were commonly portrayed wearing Moche clothing that contained details pertaining to both genders or items that were not specific to either. Descendants of Moche people today continue to have strong weaving traditions.

=== Metalwork ===
The Moche discovered both electrochemical replacement plating and depletion gilding, which they used to cover copper crafts found at Loma Negra in thin layers of gold or silver. Modern attempts were able to recreate a similar chemical plating process using boiling water and salts found naturally in the area. It is the Moche ceramic tradition that had previously been given the most attention in Archaeology, though this is beginning to change as archaeologists continue to discover ties between iconography on ceramic and other parts of Moche art. Just as important to Moche craftsmanship and culture is metallurgy. The skill required to create these objects is perhaps some of the finest the world has ever known.

The first Moche metalworks entered into the archaeological record were unearthed by Max Uhle at Huaca del Sol and Huaca de Luna during 1899 and 1900, but were largely ignored while Uhle focused on other aspects of the sites. Moche metal work gained attention after Peruvian researcher Rafael Larco Hoyle published Los Mochicas in 1945. Here, he mostly focused on describing the large flared headdresses and brilliantly decorated nose ornaments often found in connection with the Moche elite. Despite having no formal training in archaeology, Larco Hoyle was the first to truly attempt a systematic reconstruction of the Moche by drawing on information from excavations, art, iconography, Spanish documents, and modern traditions. The discovery of bronze and gold artifacts buried in the Warrior Priest tomb at the Huaca de la Cruz site one year later also encouraged further study. The same would happen when burial grounds at the site now known as Loma Negra in the Piura Valley were unearthed by looters finding a wealth of gold, silver, and copper objects along with ceramic vessels. An important discovery in the context of Moche metallurgy was the discovery of the Tombs of Sipán in 1986. These burials included a wealth of metal objects unparalleled with any previous discovery. Most of these objects remained in their original context, allowing researchers to prove beyond reasonable doubt that metal objects were closely intertwined with the power of the Moche elite. The rulers of the Moche were incredibly adept at portraying and perpetuating their power through art, which is well-exemplified by the Moche metallurgy.

Moche techniques in metalworking have proved to be an intriguing area of research. Their techniques were likely some of the most advanced in the world during the time of the Moche; restoration has proven difficult to many present-day metalworkers. Craftspeople perfected a wide variety of metalworking techniques. When they invaded in the sixteenth century, Spanish conquistadors took note of the highly skilled metalwork the Inca were able to produce. Unlike European metalworkers, the Inca blew through long tubes to heat coals, rather than using bellows to create a forced draft of air. It is probable that the Moche used a similar method. In fact, archaeologists are aware of several bowls from the Moche culture that depict this process. Many of the Moche metalworking techniques were invented or at least perfected by the Moche themselves, but they owe the invention of some of their most-used techniques at least in part to the influences of the Chavín culture that preceded them. Like the artists of Chavín, they mostly used alloys that contained some combination of gold, silver, or copper that they had developed. While Moche art as a whole is very much independent of the Chavín style, many recurring motifs found across Moche art, including the metalwork, also seem to have their roots in Chavín culture. Moche art continues the tradition of anthropomorphic figures as well as characters with prominent fangs, although the fangs are usually less pronounced than Chavín art and not present quite as often. That is not to say that the Moche did not leave their own mark on the Anden society. Many of the techniques developed by the Moche, especially their electroplating and gilding techniques used to make copper alloys appear to be almost internally gold or silver, would continue to be used up until the Inca conquest hundreds of years after the Moche's collapse.

Several examples of the molds used to shape the low relief sculptures have been discovered, most are made of a solid metal alloy but wood molds were also used. Researchers Christopher B. Donnan and David A. Scott proved how delicate this process of shaping is when they used a cast of one of the copper alloy molds to recreate the process. They found one of the most important parts of the process is the thickness of the sheet metal. Too thick and it will fail to capture the details of the mold and prove too difficult to shape, but too thin and the metal would winkle and tear. They found 0.4mm to be the ideal thickness although the repeated hammering thinned the sheet down to 0.25mm, in addition to hammering repeated annealing was also required. Analysis of the items found at the tombs of Sipan has found that the Moche were able to maintain an almost completely uniform thickness between 1 and about 0.1 millimeters depending on the object.

When this was completed several other techniques could be used to finish the piece. Oftentimes other pieces were attached, sometimes with the intention of being moving parts of the work. More often than not this was done by crimping the metal or the use of interlocking tabs and slits in the two parts, but soldering and edged-wielding were also used. Finishing touches could also be added with embossing, punching and chasing along with embedding other precious materials. Stones such as lapis lazuli, turquoise, spondylus shells, and others have all been found embedded in Moche metal works. It is worth noting that several of the materials are not found on the Moche coast. Lapis Lazuli was available only from modern Chile hundreds of miles to the south and Spondulus shells had to be acquired from modern Ecuador to the north. This makes it clear that the Moche must have had extensive trade networks, and likely contact with other cultures. Also notable in this context is the fact that many of the animals accurately depicted in Moche artwork are found only in the tropical Amazon.

=== Agricultural engineering ===
Researchers of the Moche culture agree that the emergence of the Moche culture is related to the intensification of the production of corn, cotton, beans and squash, among other agricultural products, which allowed the development of a regional Moche political economy in the Valley of Moche from the north coast of Peru during the Early Intermediate Period (400 BC–600 AD).

The northern region of Peru is one of the most arid areas in the world, where there is no rain throughout the year. That factor, far from discouraging the establishment of communities, was the trigger for the construction of an outstanding culture that developed engineering works that interconnected various river valleys, with the aim of irrigating desert territories.

Many of the Moche agricultural systems are still in operation, such as the Ascope aqueduct, the La Cumbre Canal, in Chicama, or the San Jose dam, which continue to provide water, coming from the Andean region and groundwater, guaranteeing several harvests per year.

Access to new farmland, gained from the desert, was the starting point of a civilization that, based on abundant harvests, became socially stratified. All this allowed certain members of the community to no longer dedicate themselves exclusively to food production, and a process of specialization began that led to the development of the Moche civilization.

=== Gallery ===
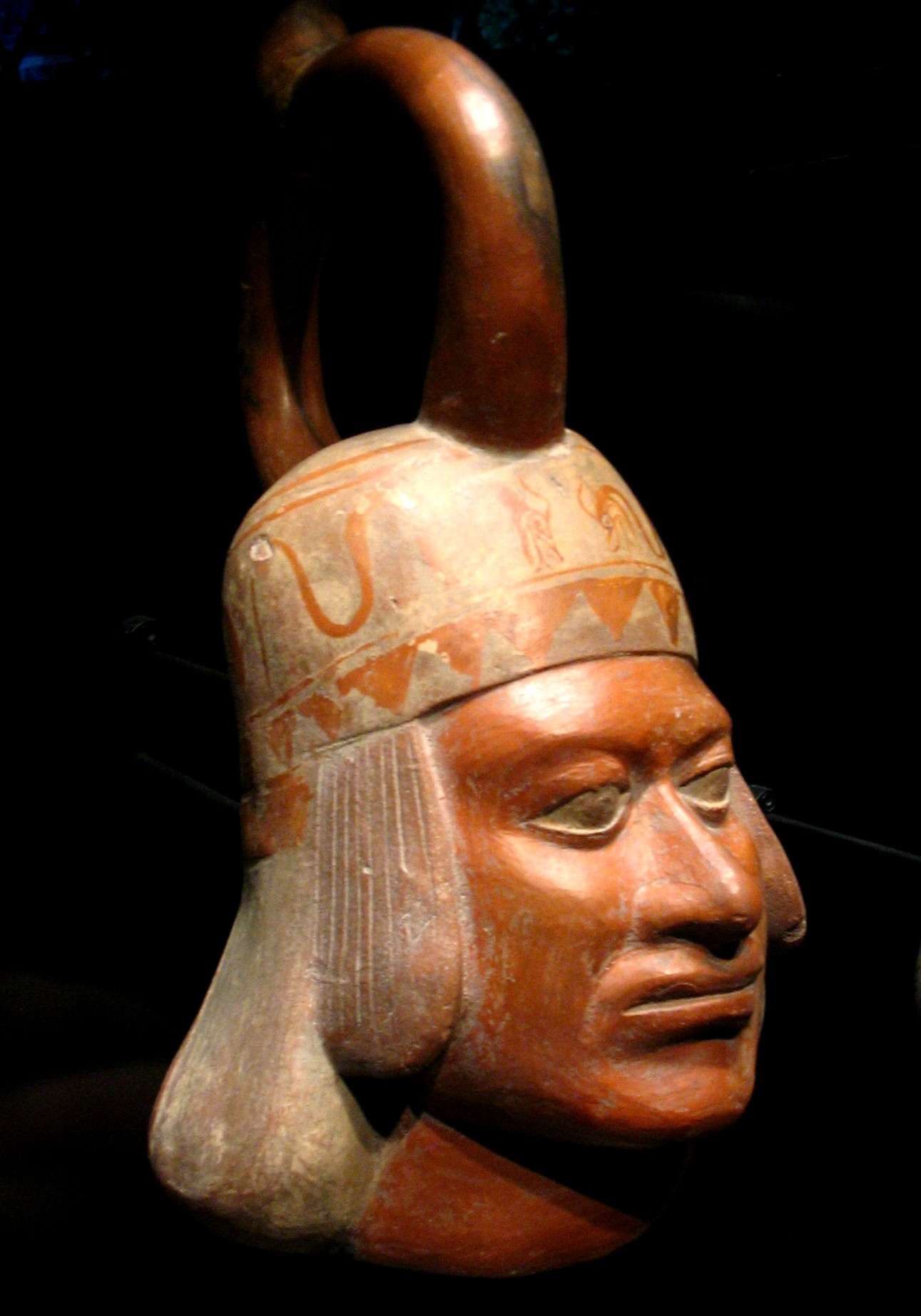
Moche portrait vessel,
Musée du quai Branly, Paris

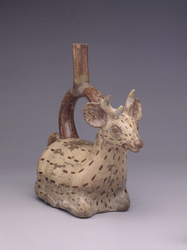
Resting deer,
Larco Museum Collection, Lima

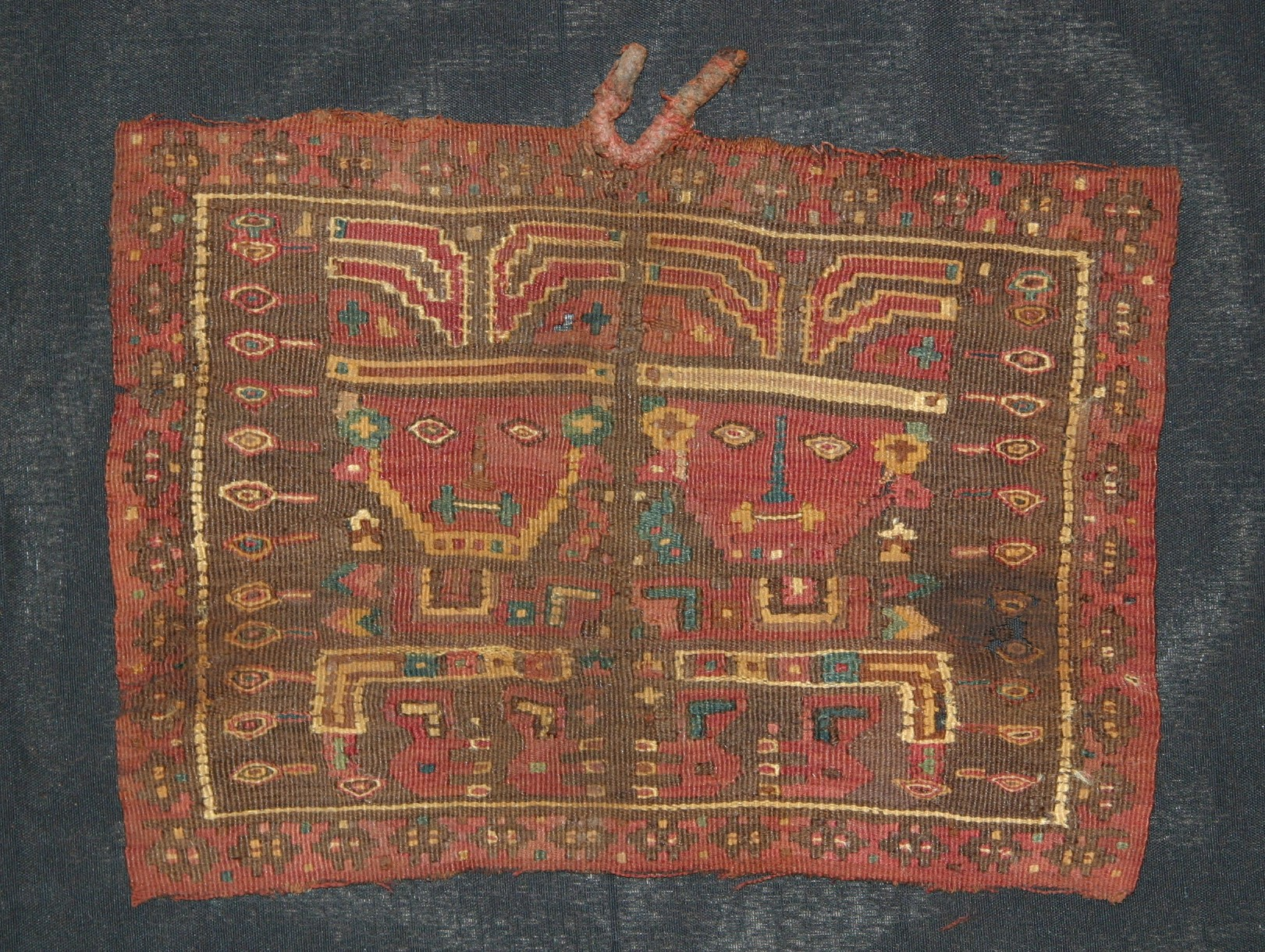
Alpaca wool tapestry (600–900 AD), Lombards Museum

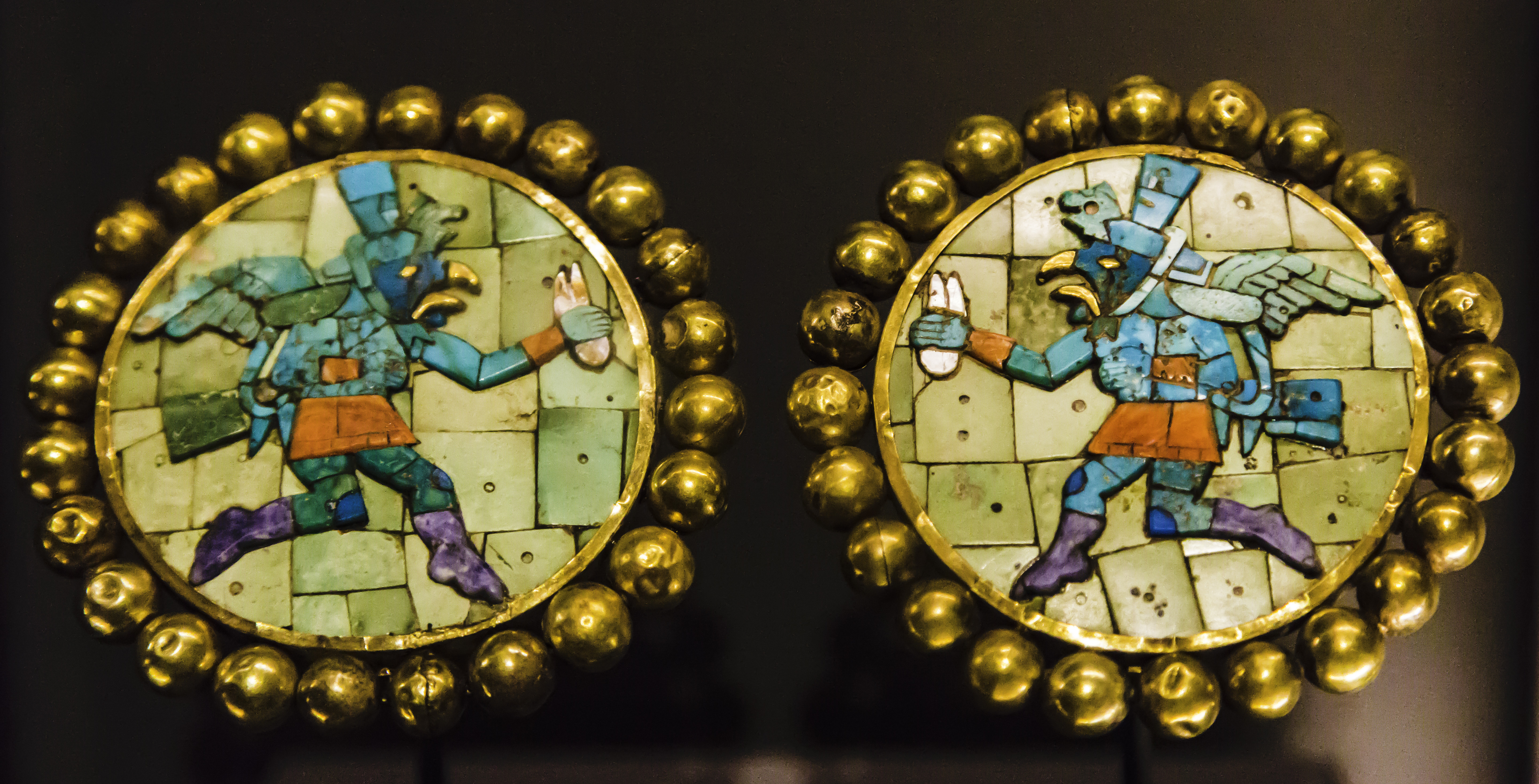
Earplugs of gold inlaid with precious stones

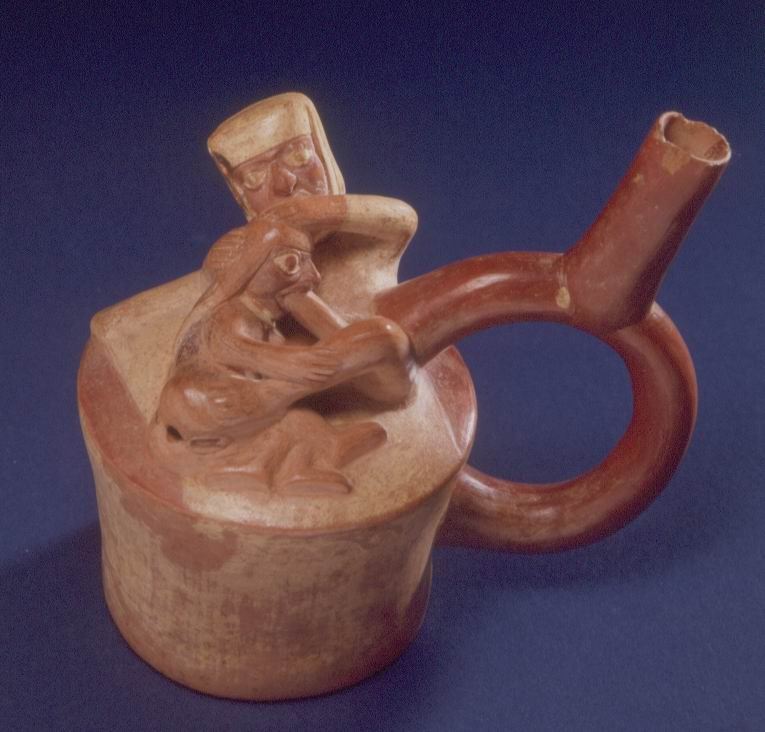
Ceramic depicting fellatio (300 AD),
Larco Museum, Lima

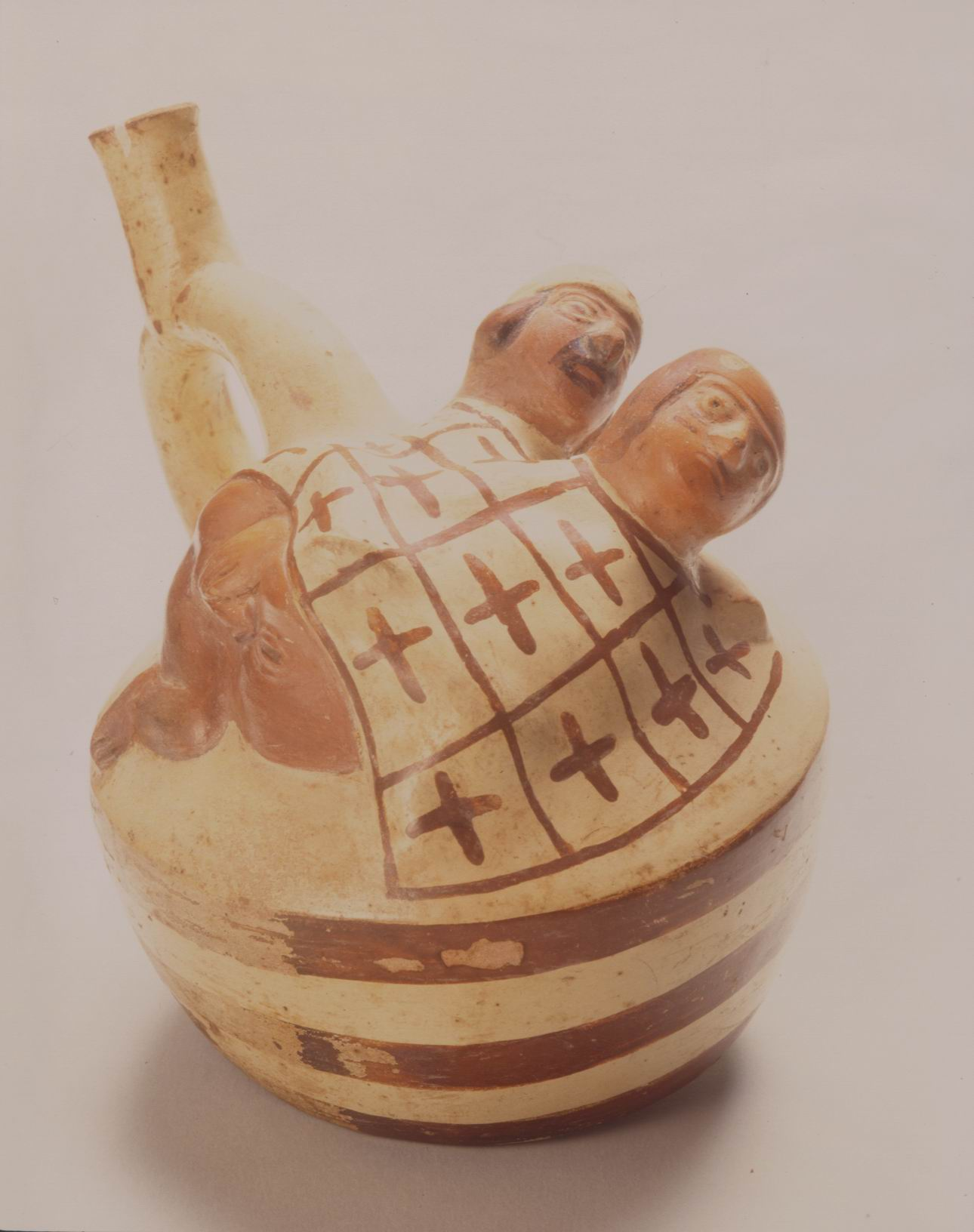
Ceramic depicting anal sex

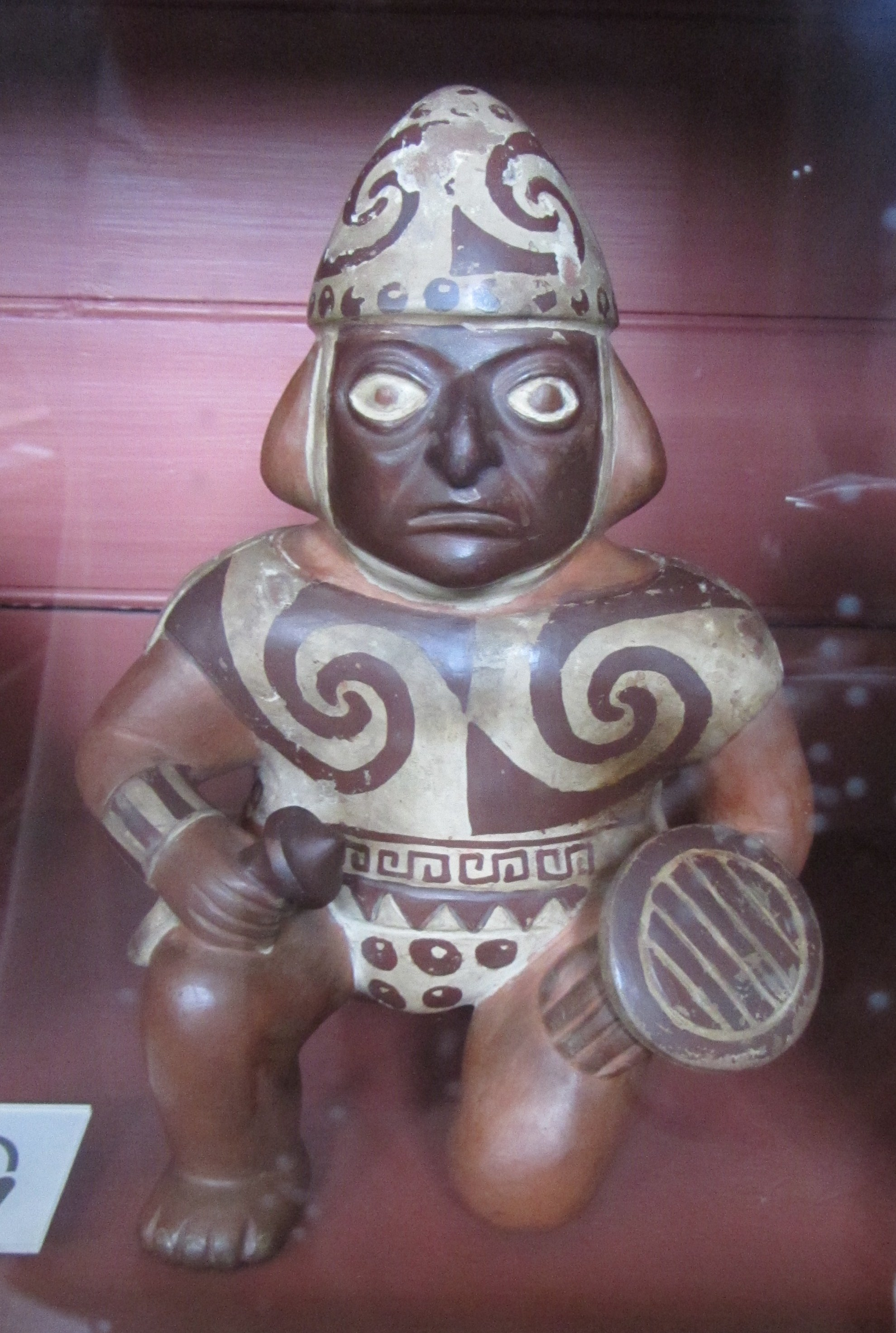
Moche warrior pot, British Museum, London

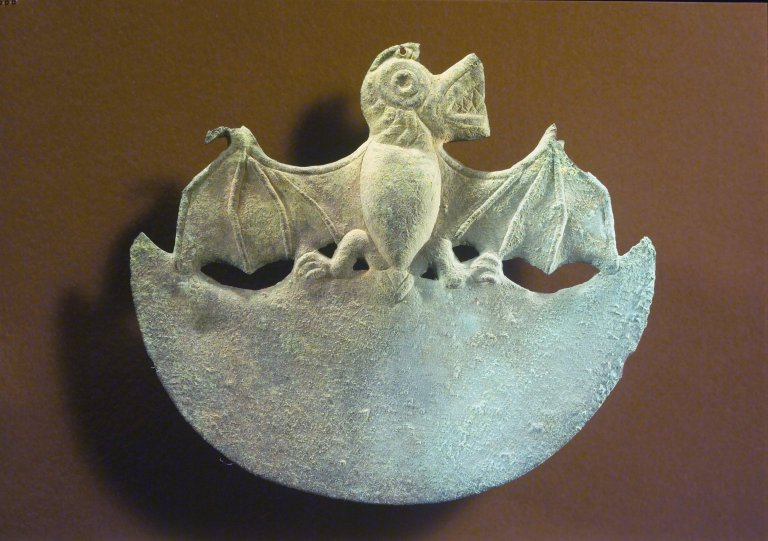
Crescent-shaped ornament with bat, CE 1–300 Brooklyn Museum, Brooklyn

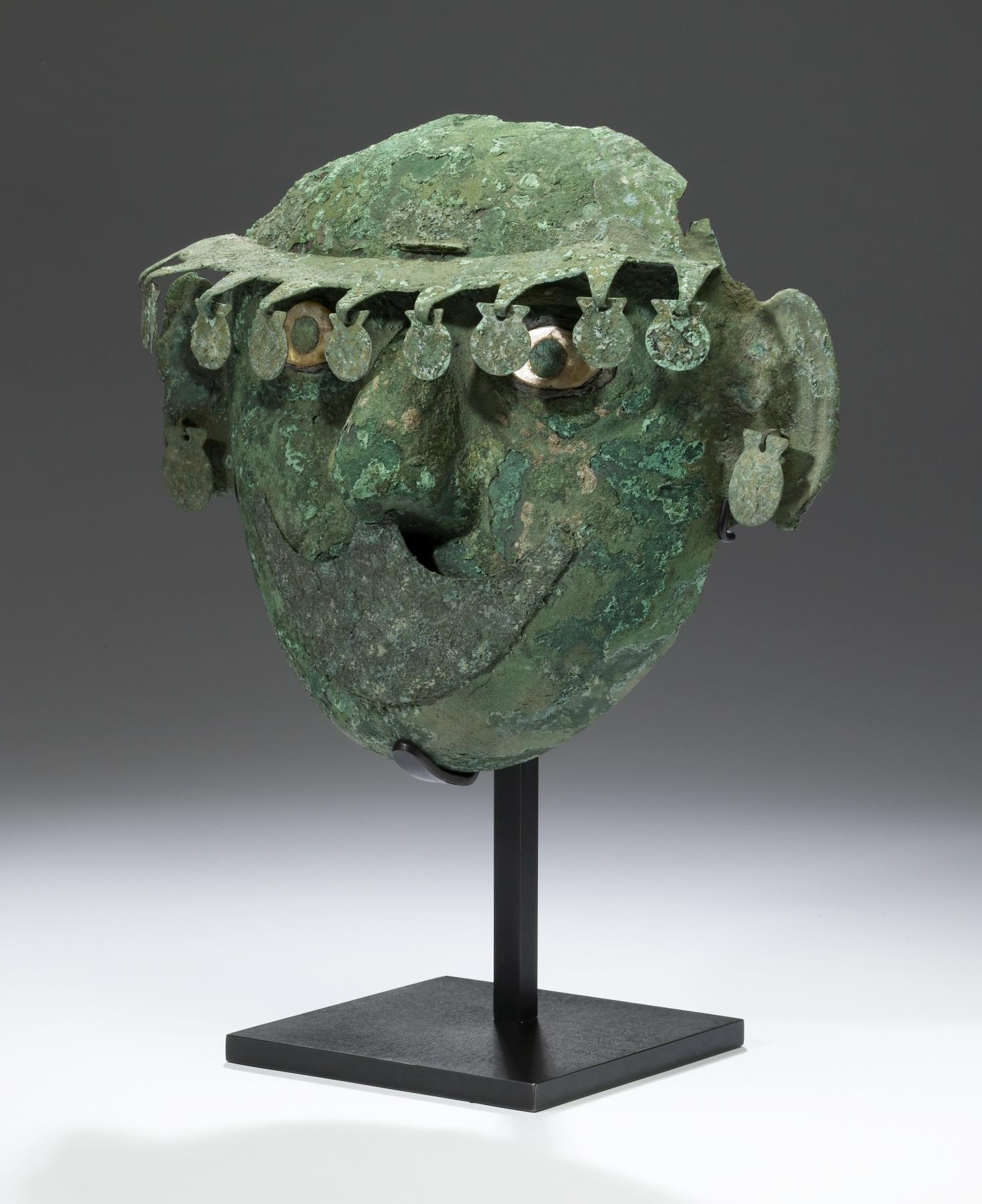
Copper alloy mask with shell, CE 1–600 Walters Art Museum, Baltimore

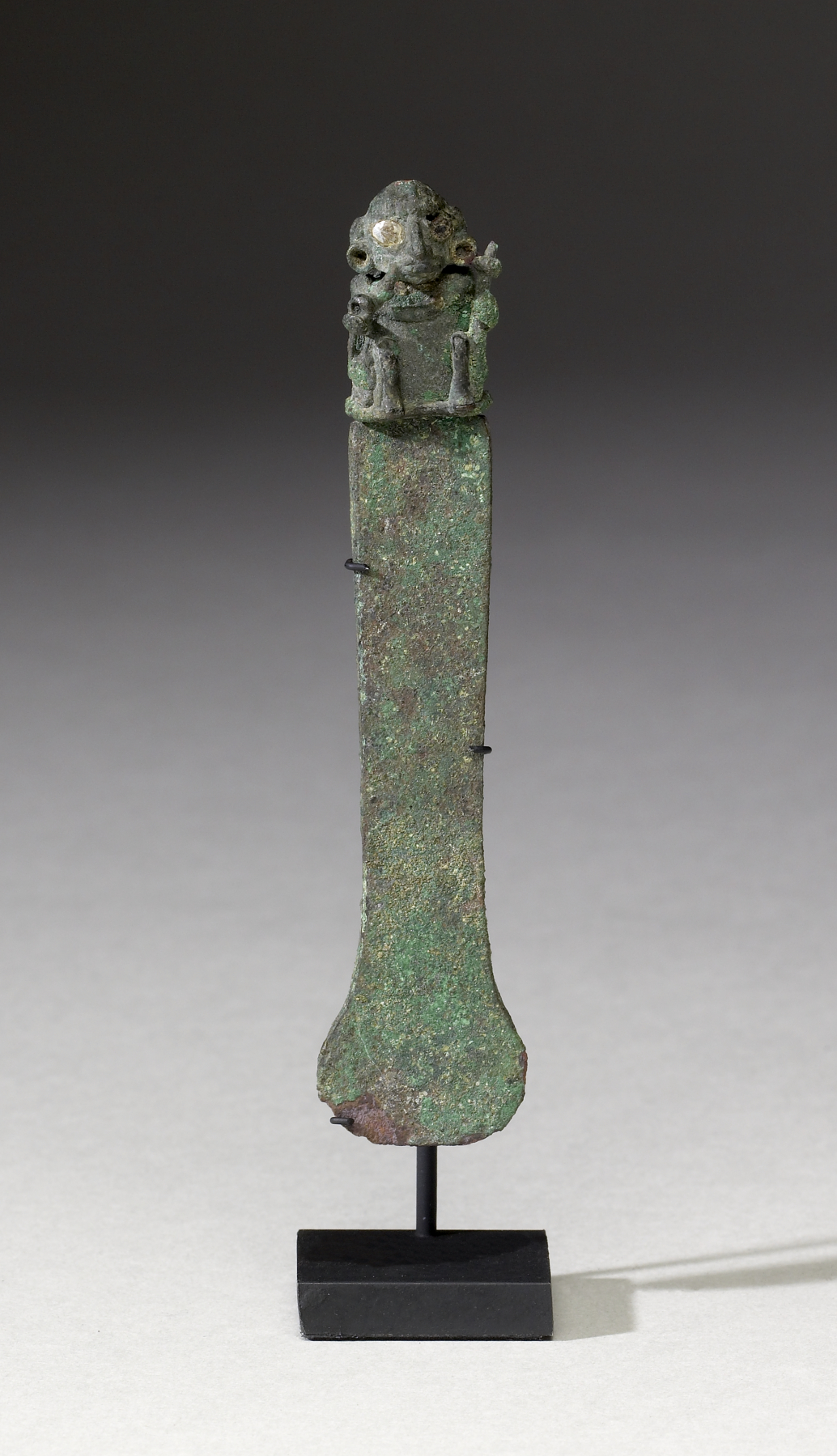
Copper knife with removable figural handle, 50–800 AD Walters Art Museum, Baltimore

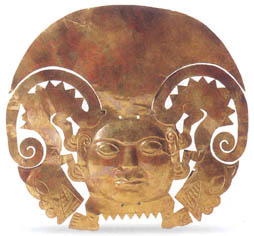
Moche headdress with feline ornamentations, 400 AD Larco Museum, Lima

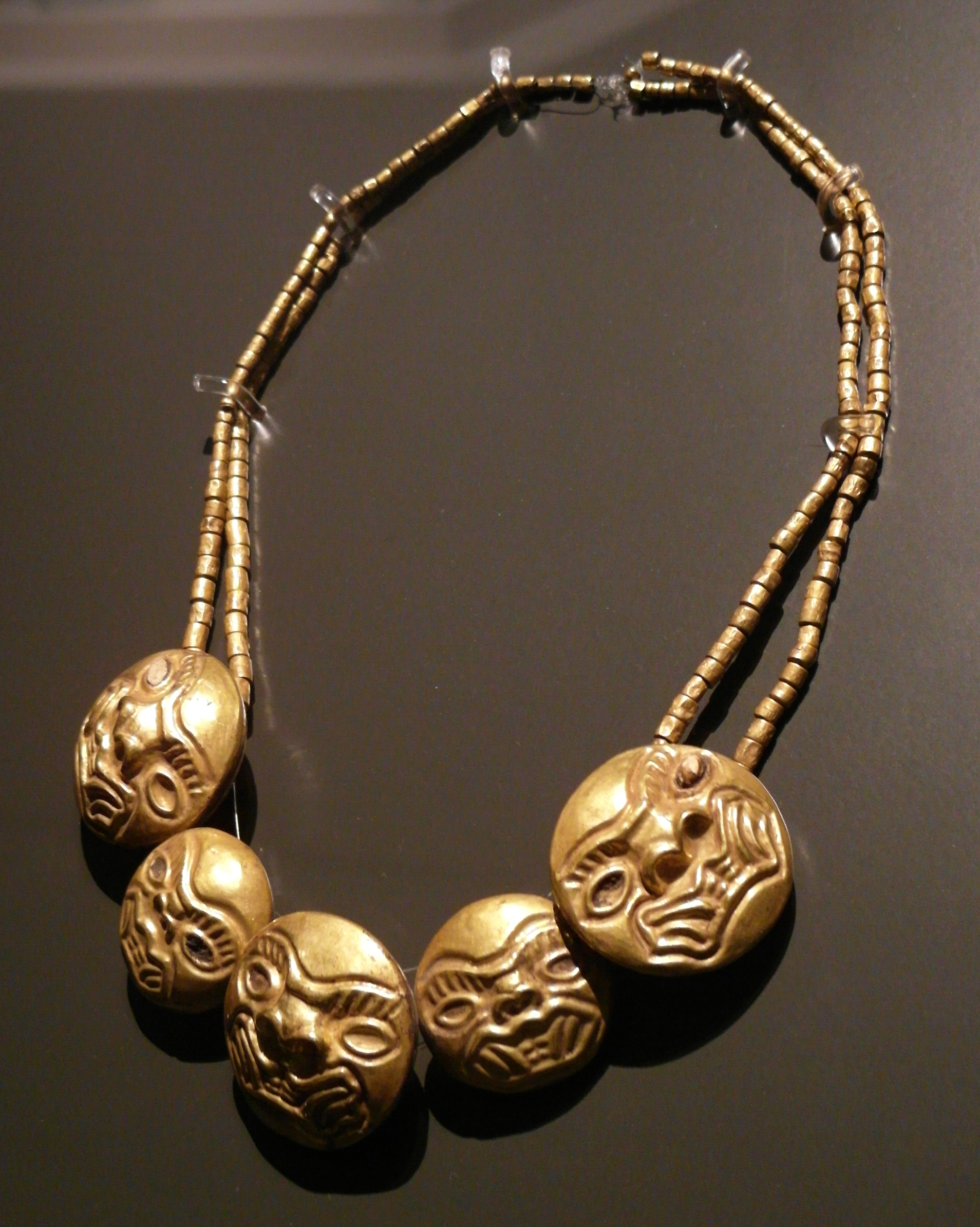
Gold Moche necklace with feline faces, Larco Museum, Lima

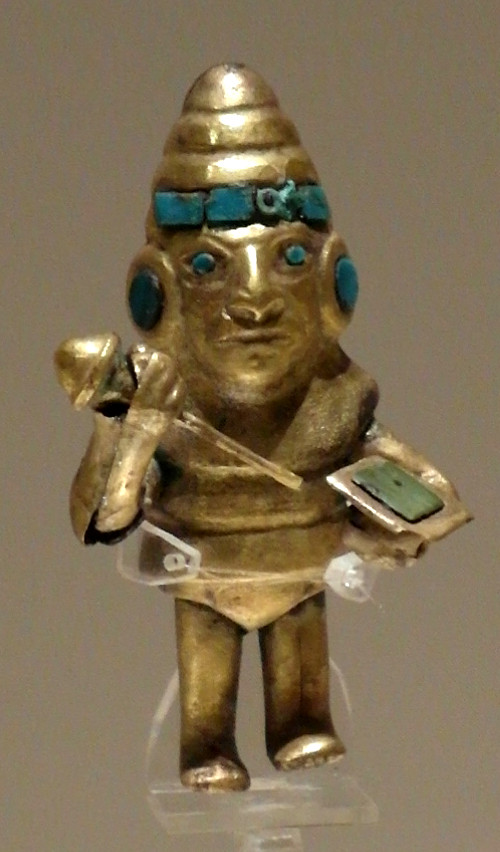
Gold Moche whistle with turquoise depicting a warrior, 1–800 AD Larco Museum, Lima

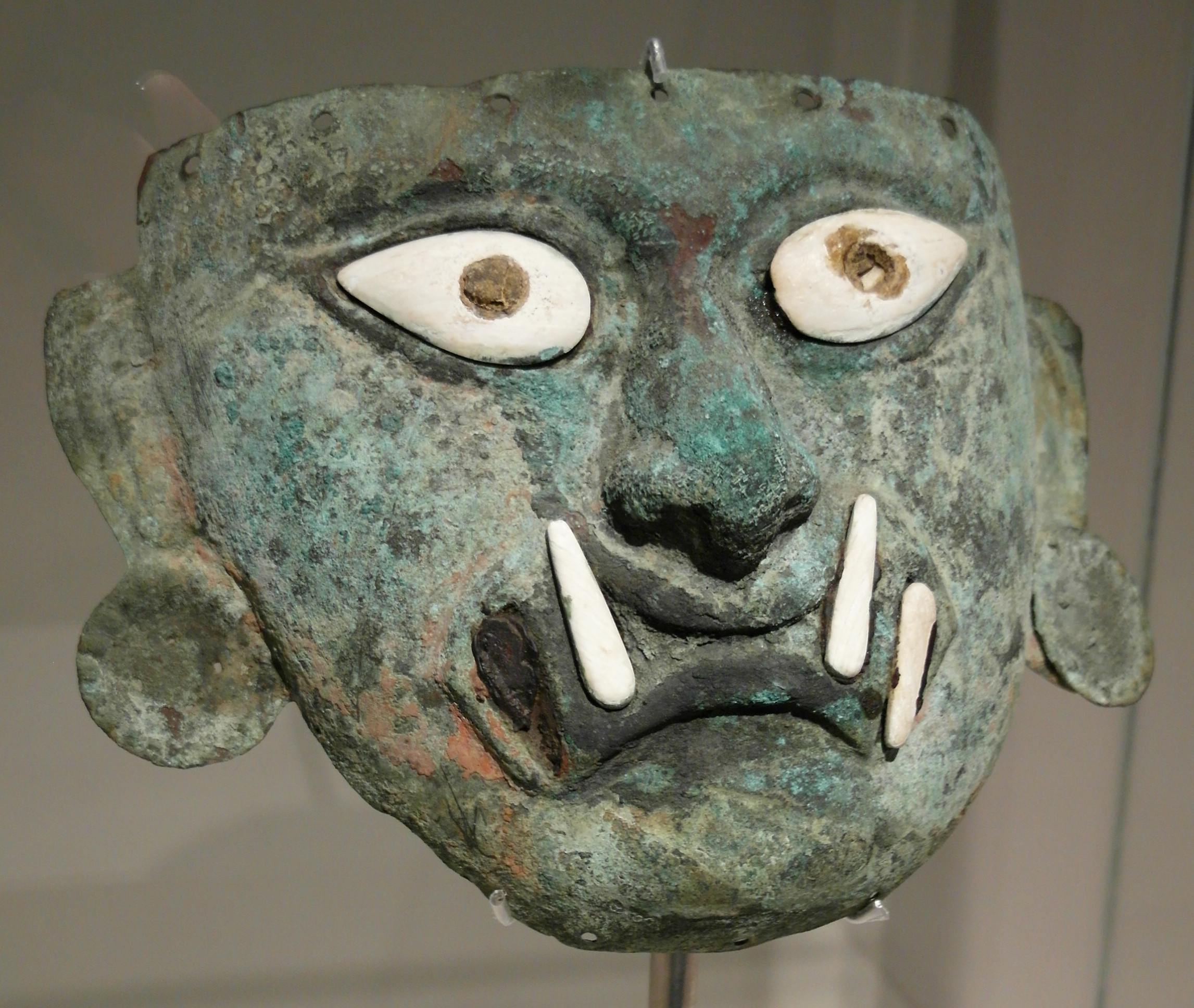
Bronze and shell Moche mask depicting the hero Ai Apaec

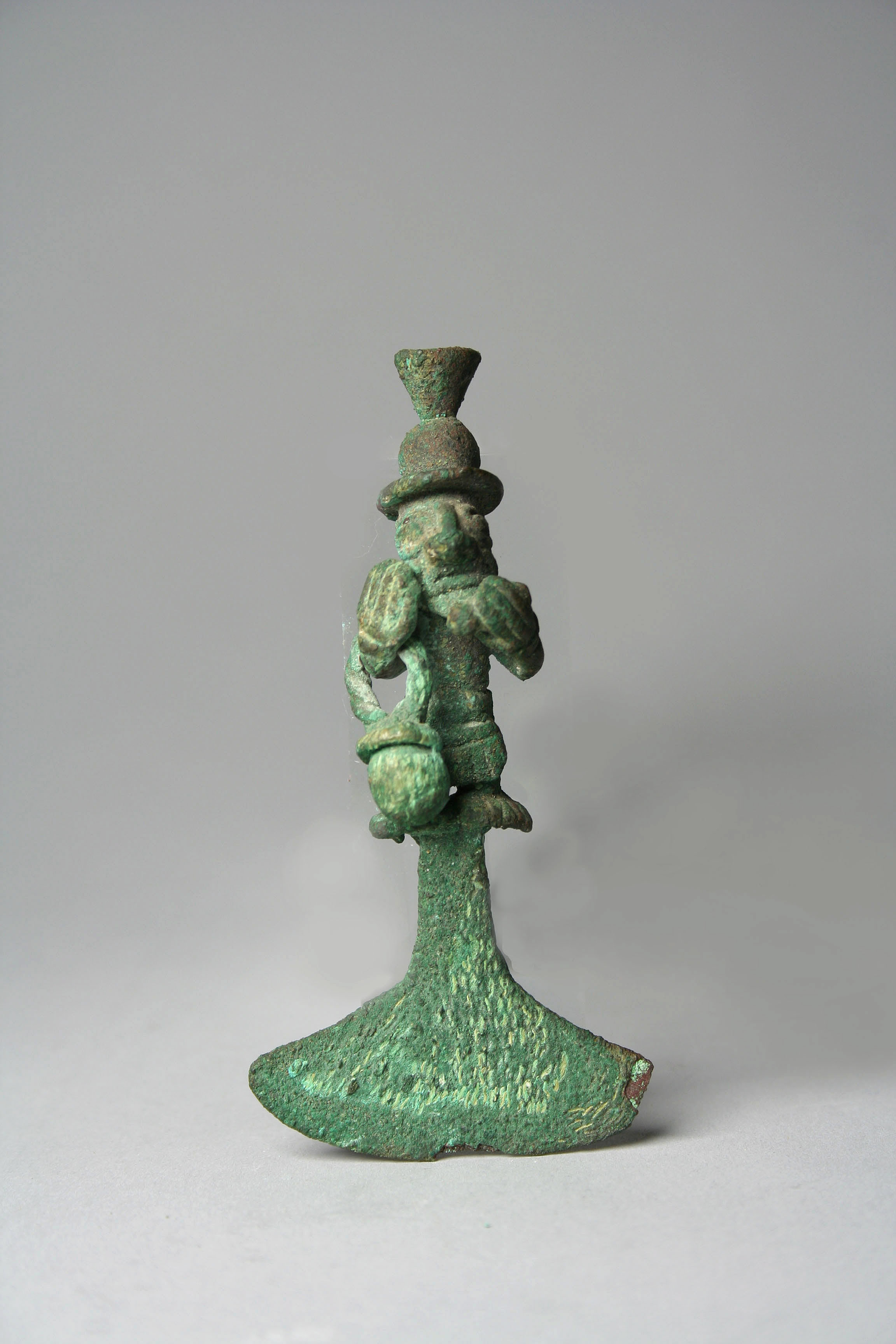
Copper ceremonial knife (Tumi), 3rd – 7th century AD, Metropolitan Museum of Art, New York City

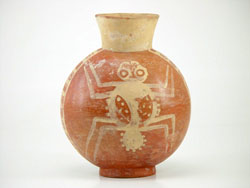
A ceramic depicting a spider from around 300 CE

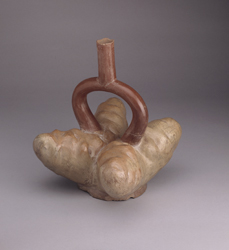
A ceramic depicting potatoes

Ceramic depicting a sea lion pup

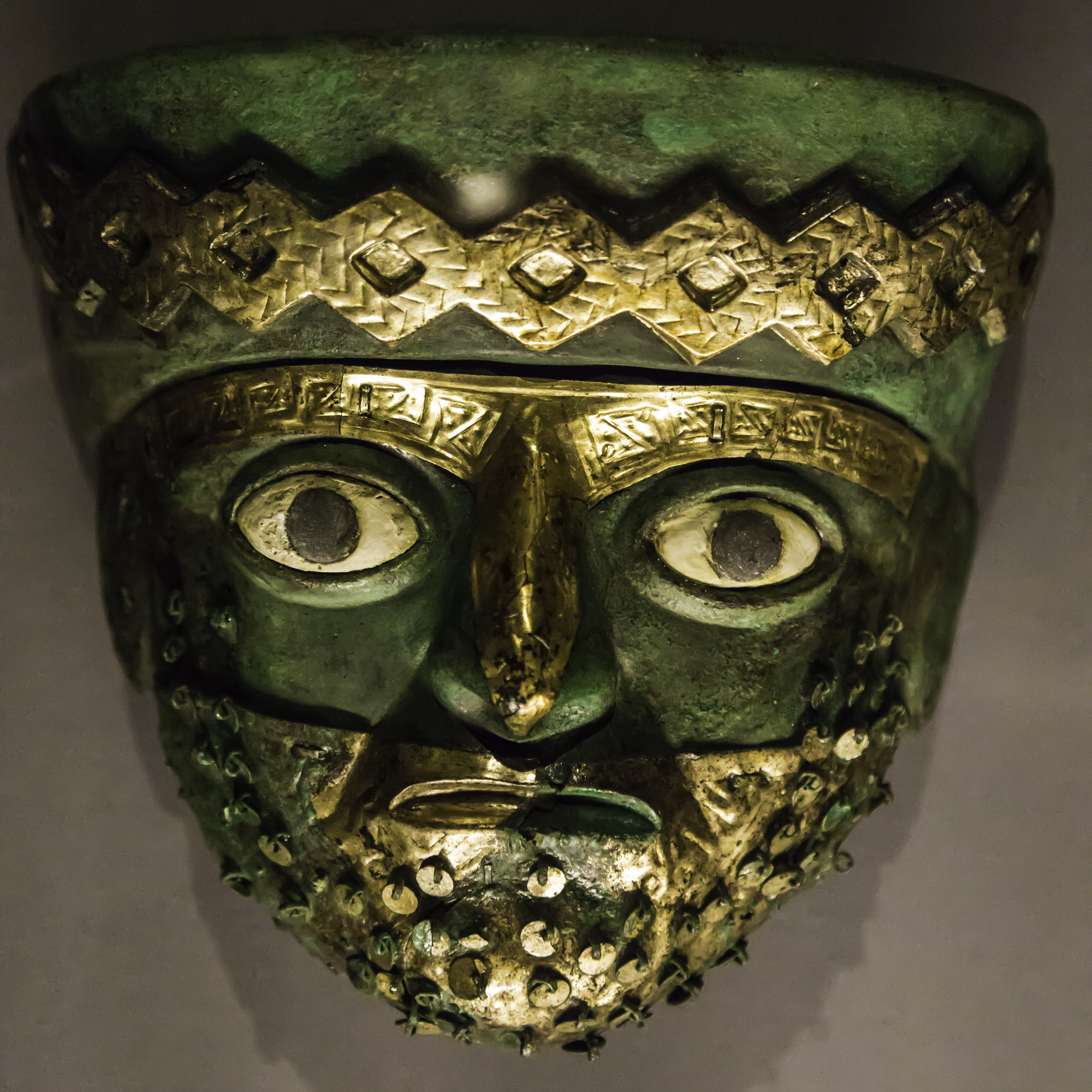
Burial Mask

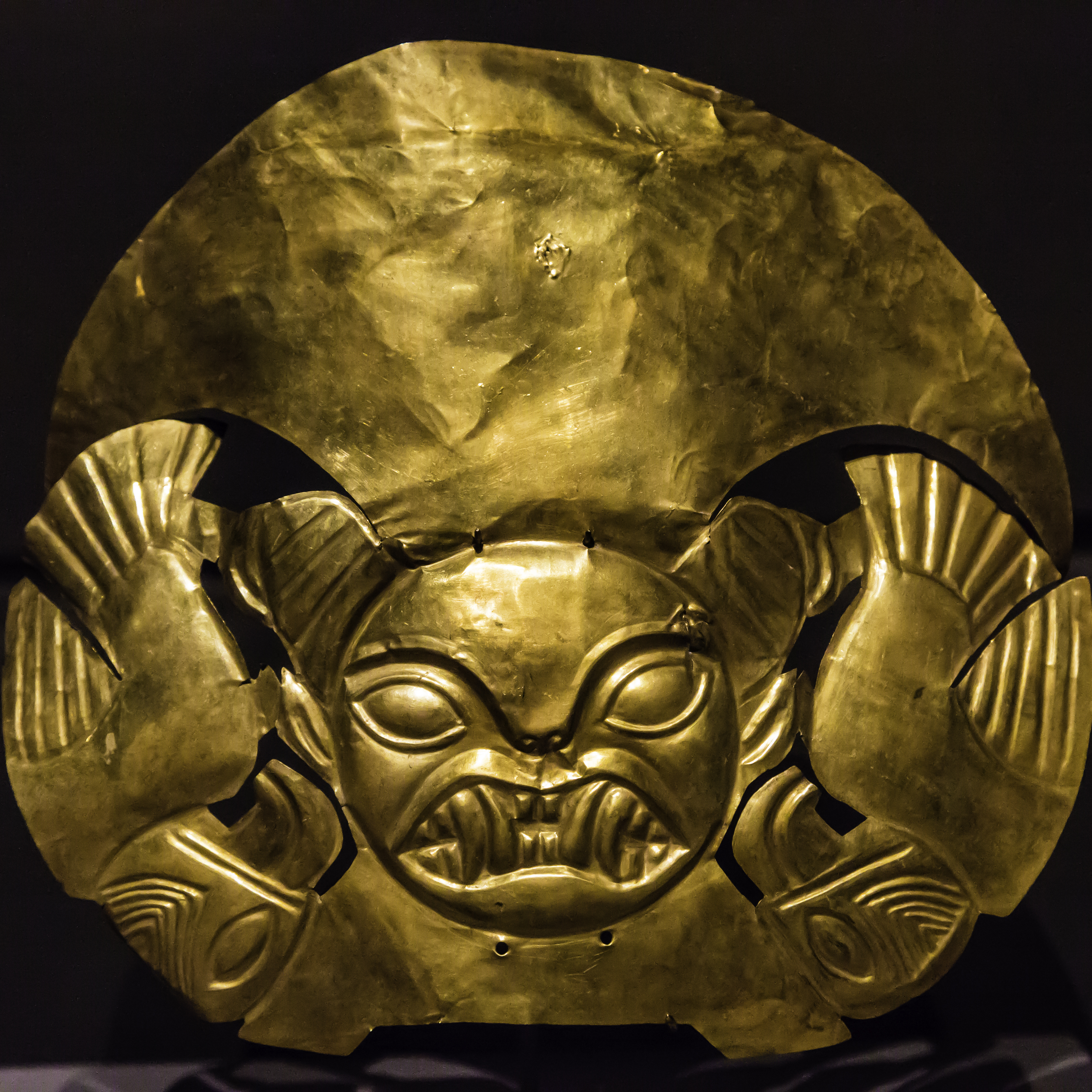
Gold headdress ornament

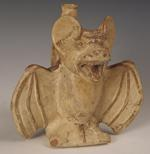
Ceramic depicting a bat

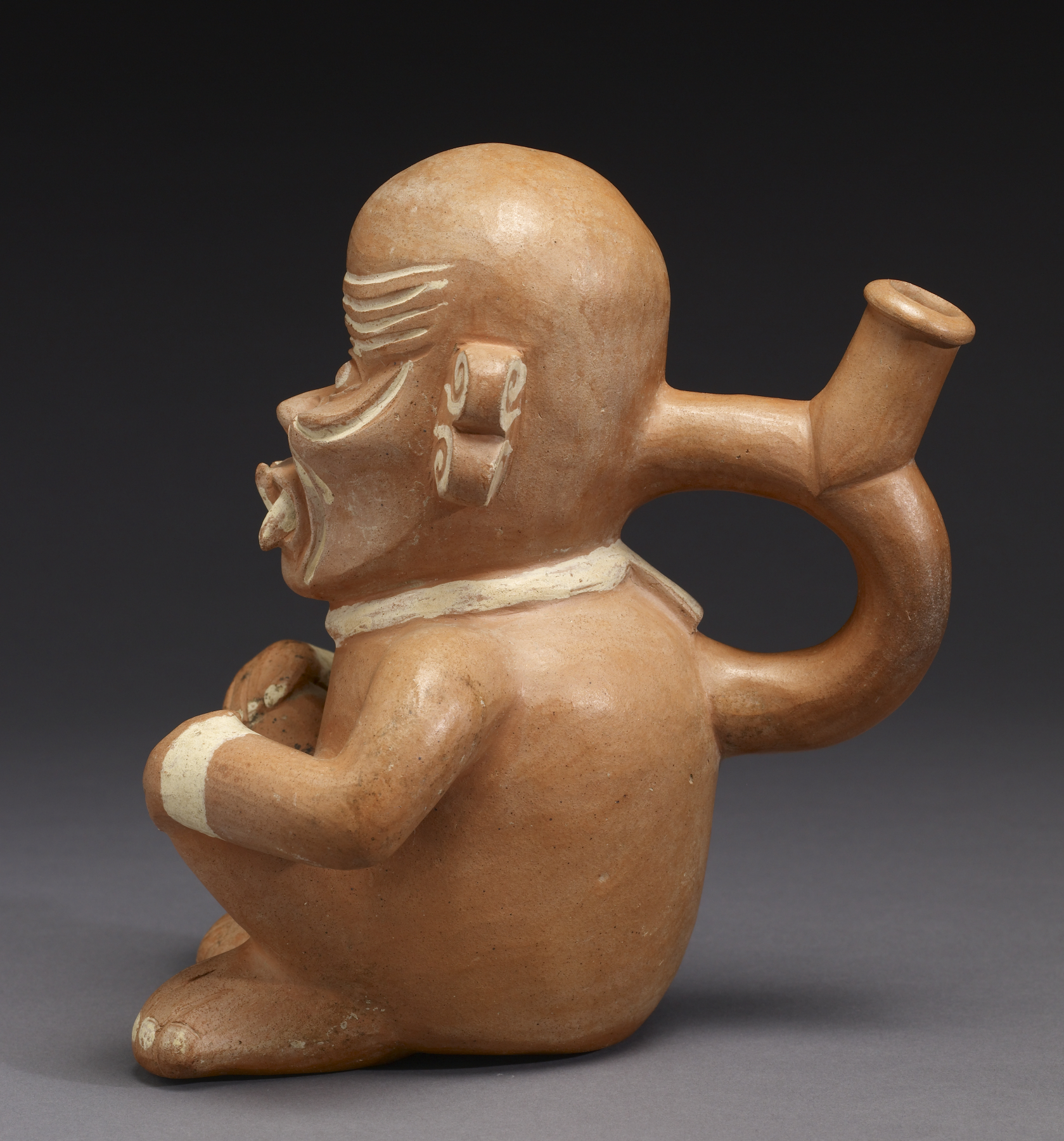
Sculpture depicting a seated man or deity

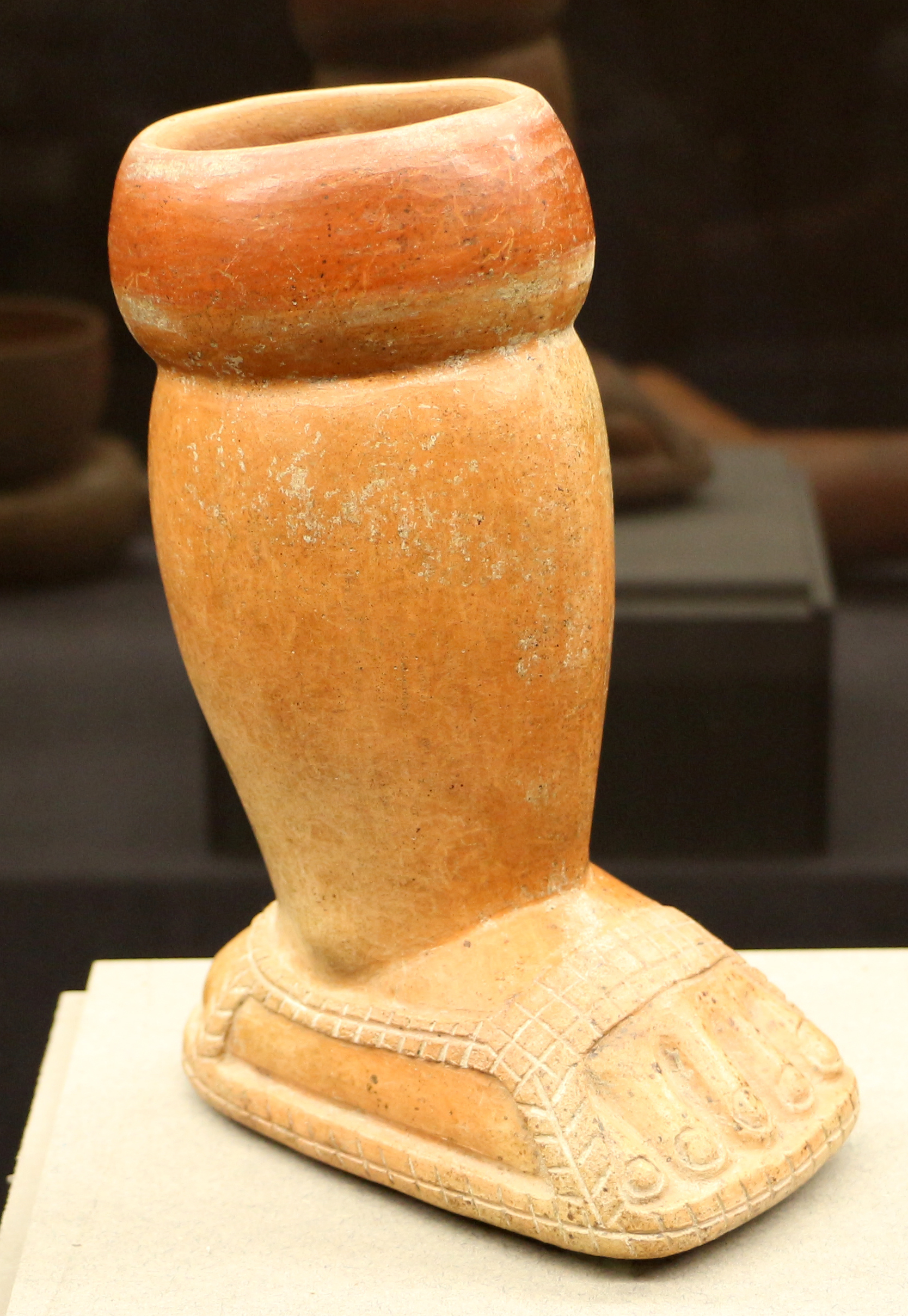
Foot

== Religion ==
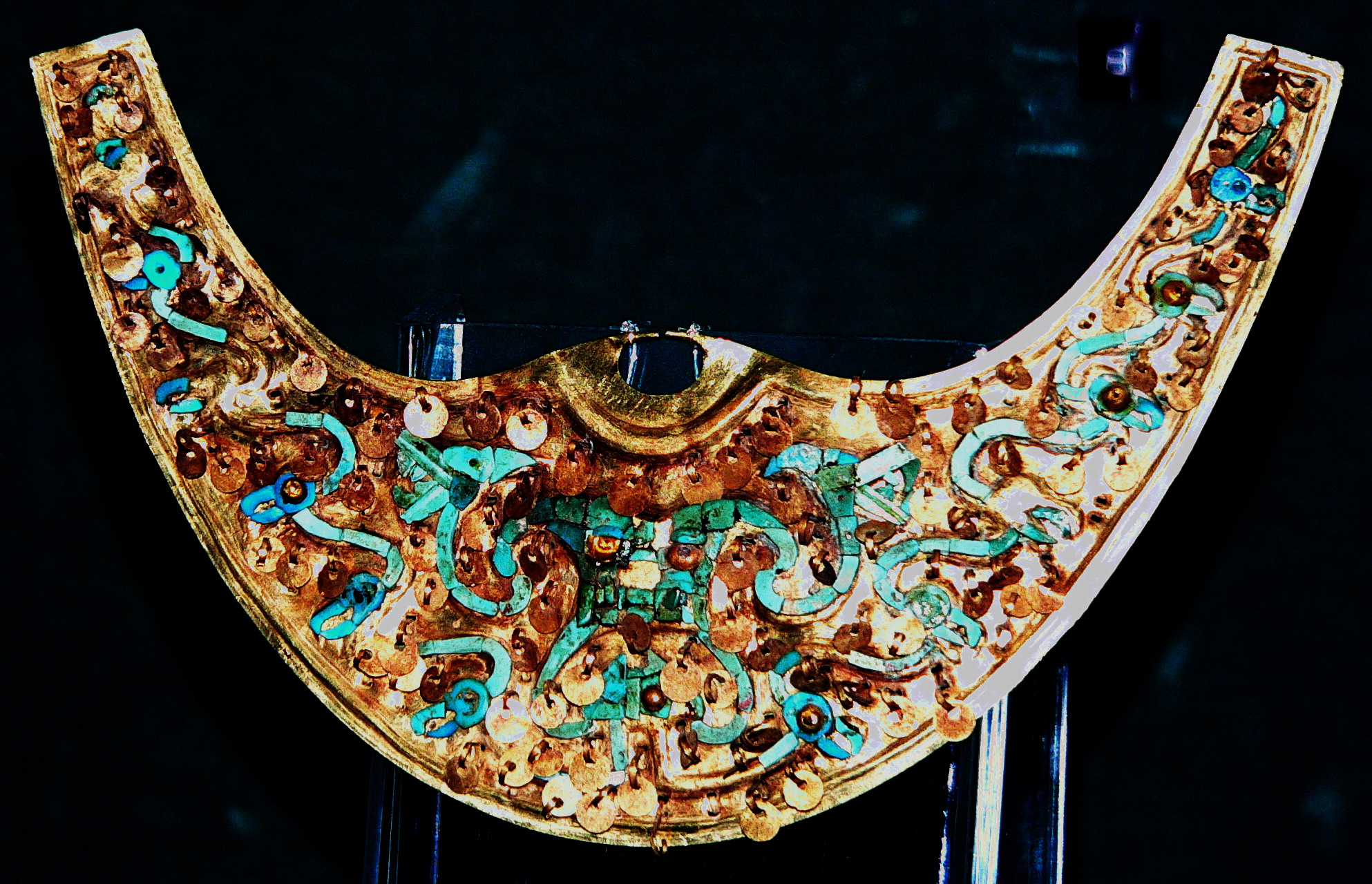
Moche Nariguera depicting the Decapitator, gold with turquoise and chrysocolla inlays. Museo Oro del Peru, Lima

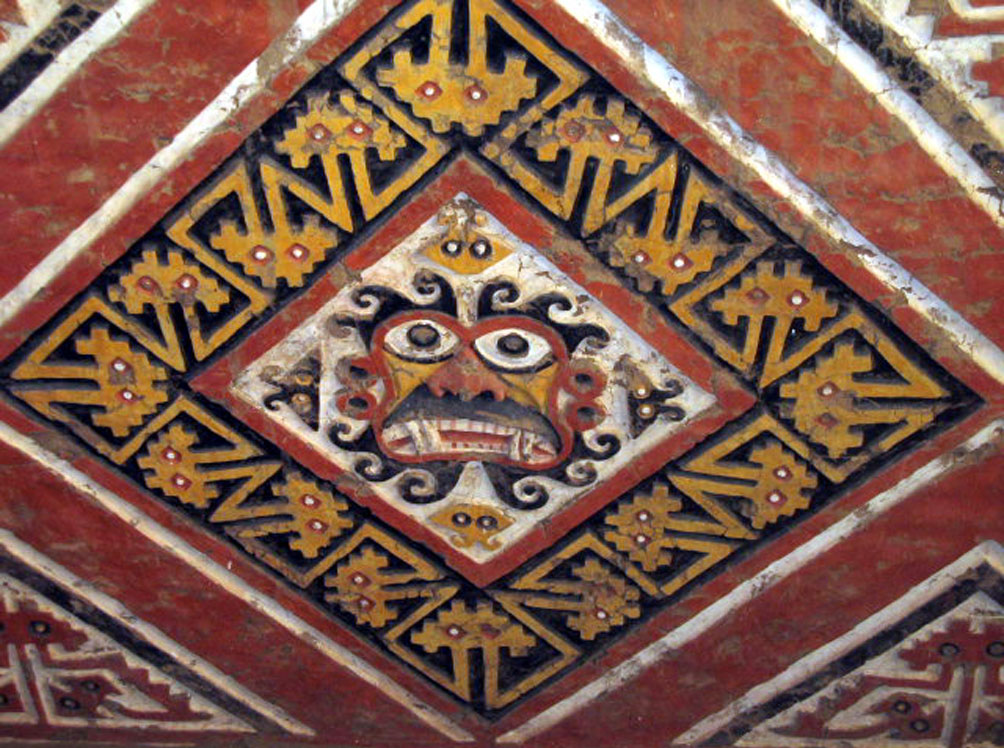
Moche "Decapitator" mural at Huaca de la Luna

Both iconography and the finds of human skeletons in ritual contexts seem to indicate that human sacrifice played a significant part in Moche religious practices. In some sacrifice scenes on ceramics, there is a mythical creature called the animal lunar/moon animal, which is placed above a prisoner's head. This shows the significance of human sacrifice. When the artist places the creature there, the viewer can assume the prisoner's fate. These rites appear to have involved the elite as key actors in a spectacle of costumed participants, monumental settings and possibly the ritual consumption of blood. The tumi was a crescent-shaped metal knife used in sacrifices. While some scholars, such as Christopher B. Donnan and Izumi Shimada, argue that the sacrificial victims were the losers of ritual battles among local elites, others, such as John Verano and Richard Sutter, suggest that the sacrificial victims were warriors captured in territorial battles between the Moche and other nearby societies. Excavations in plazas near Moche huacas have found groups of people sacrificed together and the skeletons of young men deliberately excarnated, perhaps for temple displays.

The Moche may have also held and tortured the victims for several weeks before sacrificing them, with the intent of deliberately drawing blood. Verano believes that some parts of the victim may have been eaten as well in ritual cannibalism. The sacrifices may have been associated with rites of ancestral renewal and agricultural fertility. Moche iconography features a figure which scholars have nicknamed the "Decapitator"; it is frequently depicted as a spider, but sometimes as a winged creature or a sea monster: together all three features symbolize land, water and air. When the body is included, the figure is usually shown with one arm holding a knife and another holding a severed head by the hair; it has also been depicted as "a human figure with a tiger's mouth and snarling fangs". The "Decapitator" is thought to have figured prominently in the beliefs surrounding the practice of sacrifice.

== Social stratification ==
Although it remains somewhat unclear how geographically divided Moche culture was, scholars are very confident that the Moche were a socially divided society. Beyond royalty, the Moche can be divided into a general upper and lower class, and each class can be further stratified into smaller groups. Intra-class movement was possible within these broad categories, but inter-class switches between them were less feasible. Many pre-contact cultures share a divided structure comparable to the Moche—but each may have unique development.

Although religion seems to have been a centripetal force for the Moche, members of the elite class likely used it to reinforce their status. Other ideological, economic, political, and social factors may have also been leveraged to similar ends. A common approach to maintaining power was for members of the elite, such as priests and priestesses, to use ceremonies to reinforce their standing (see the Religion section for more information on ceremonies). It may also be true that physical force was used. The Moche elite may have struggled to retain power at times, and inter-elite quarreling is speculated to have played into the culture's collapse.

Excavated Moche burial sites constitute a large body of evidence for social stratification. Those lowest in the Moche hierarchy were buried in a simple hole near their household; platform mounds with an abundance of goods were awarded to the highest-ranking members of society. There is a correlation between the amount of goods buried in one’s grave and the social status of that individual. An incomplete list of possible funerary objects includes copper masks, silver, pottery, and gold goods. Many Moche burials also included copper in the hands or mouth and a few cases included bones of llamas. Presence of metal-worked goods is thought to be especially significant with respect to high status. Ofrendas, which are small, roughly made ceramics vessels, are often seen in Northern Moche graves. They were likely intended to be drinking vessels that the funeral attendants would have made and then used to drink from at the funeral. More ofrendas in a grave likely meant more people attended the funeral for that individual. Excavation of dwellings indicates that living conditions of Moche likely also differed based on social standing, but excavation data here remains skewed and not entirely complete so far. Excavated elite burials also illustrate that remains sexed both male and female held elite positions in Moche culture.

== Collapse ==
There are many theories as to what caused the demise of the Moche political structure. Some scholars have emphasized the role of environmental change. Studies of ice cores drilled from glaciers in the Andes reveal climatic events between 563 and 594 AD, possibly a super El Niño, that resulted in 30 years of intense rain and flooding followed by 30 years of drought, part of the aftermath of the climate changes of 535–536. These weather events could have disrupted the Moche way of life, political hierarchy, and jeopardized their faith in their religion. This super El Niño may have hindered Moche agriculture. Moche agriculture relied considerably on canal-based irrigation from Andes mountain runoff, which a severe drought would have jeopardized. Certain scholars attribute strain on the irrigation systems to sensitive tectonics in the region.

Other evidence demonstrates that these events did not cause a complete Moche demise. Moche polities survived beyond 650 AD in the Jequetepeque Valley and the Moche Valleys. For instance, in the Jequetepeque Valley, later settlements are characterized by fortifications and defensive works. While there is no evidence of a foreign invasion (i.e. a Huari invasion) as many scholars have suggested in the past, the defensive works suggest social unrest, possibly the result of climatic changes, as factions fought for control over increasingly scarce resources.

== Links with other cultures ==
Chronologically, the Moche was an Early Intermediate Period culture, which was preceded by the Chavín horizon, as well as the Cupisnique, and succeeded by the Huari and Chimú. The Moche co-existed with the Ica-Nazca culture in the south. They are thought to have had some limited contact with the Ica-Nazca because they later mined guano for fertilizer and may have traded with northerners. Moche pottery has been found near Ica, but no Ica-Nazca pottery has been found in Moche territory.

The coastal Moche culture also co-existed (or overlapped in time) with the slightly earlier Recuay culture in the highlands. Some Moche iconographic motifs can be traced to Recuay design elements.

The Moche also interacted with the neighbouring Virú culture. Eventually, by 700 CE, they had established control over the Viru.

== Archaeological discoveries ==
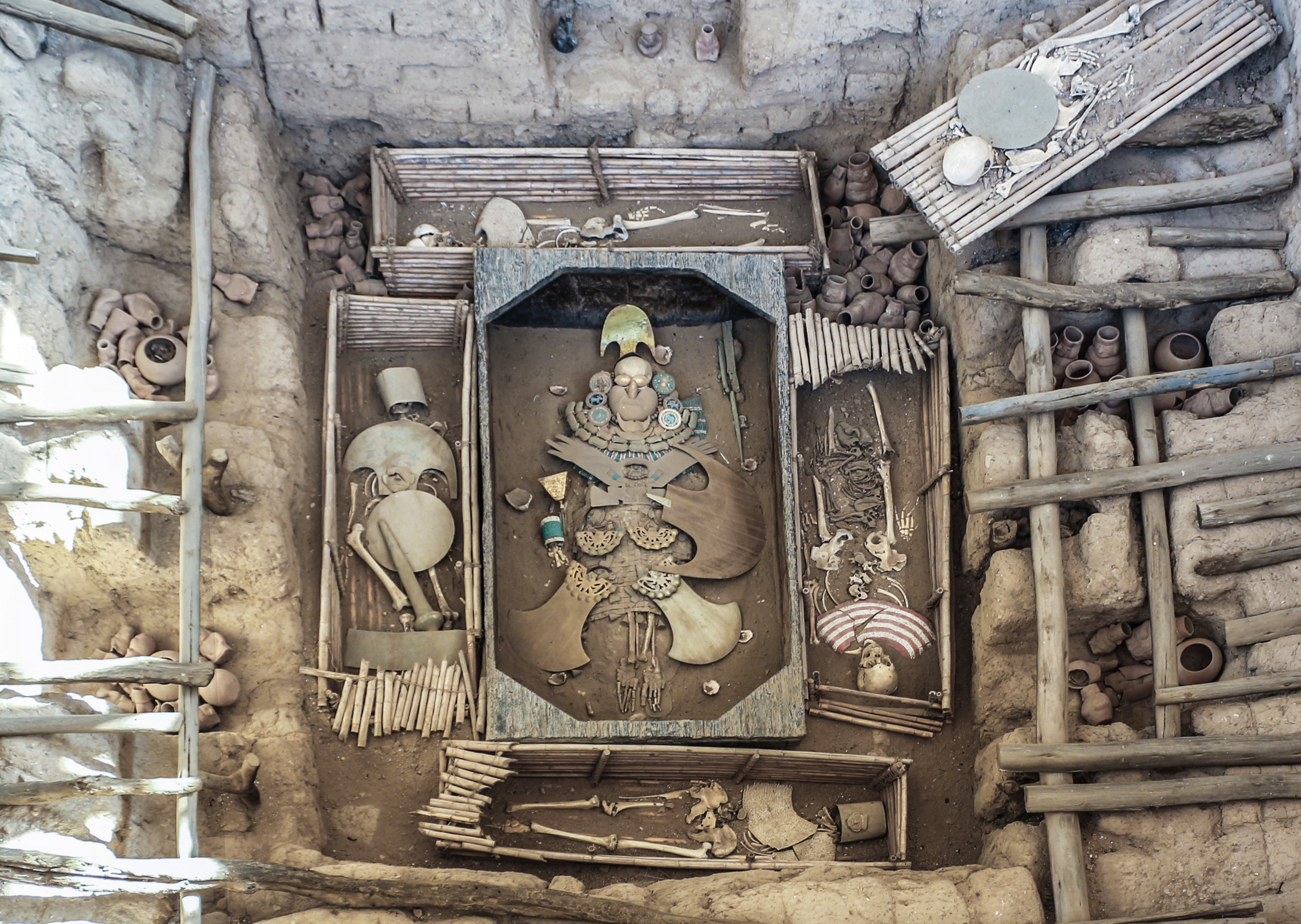
The Lord of Sipán, Royal Tombs of Sipán museum, Lambayeque, Peru

In 1899 and 1900, Max Uhle was the first archaeologist to excavate a Moche site, Huaca de la Luna, which is where the architectural complex that is known as Huacas de Moche (Pyramids of Moche) is located in the Moche Valley. The name of this architectural complex is where the name of the Moche site and culture came from.

Excavations in 1938 and 1939 by Rafael Larco Hoyle saw the development of the first interpretations of Moche culture, ranking the Moche as being "high on the list of advanced societies" as a civilization. He listed traits of the Moche culture such as "exquisite artworks" and the "creation of large scale facilities and public works" as a testament to this ranking.

Arguably the most significant event which shaped Moche archaeological research was the Virú Valley Project, beginning in 1946 and led by Willian Duncan Strong and Wendell C. Bennett. Their stratigraphic excavations in Virú showed an earlier ceramic style known as Gallinazo, which appeared to have “abruptly ended”.

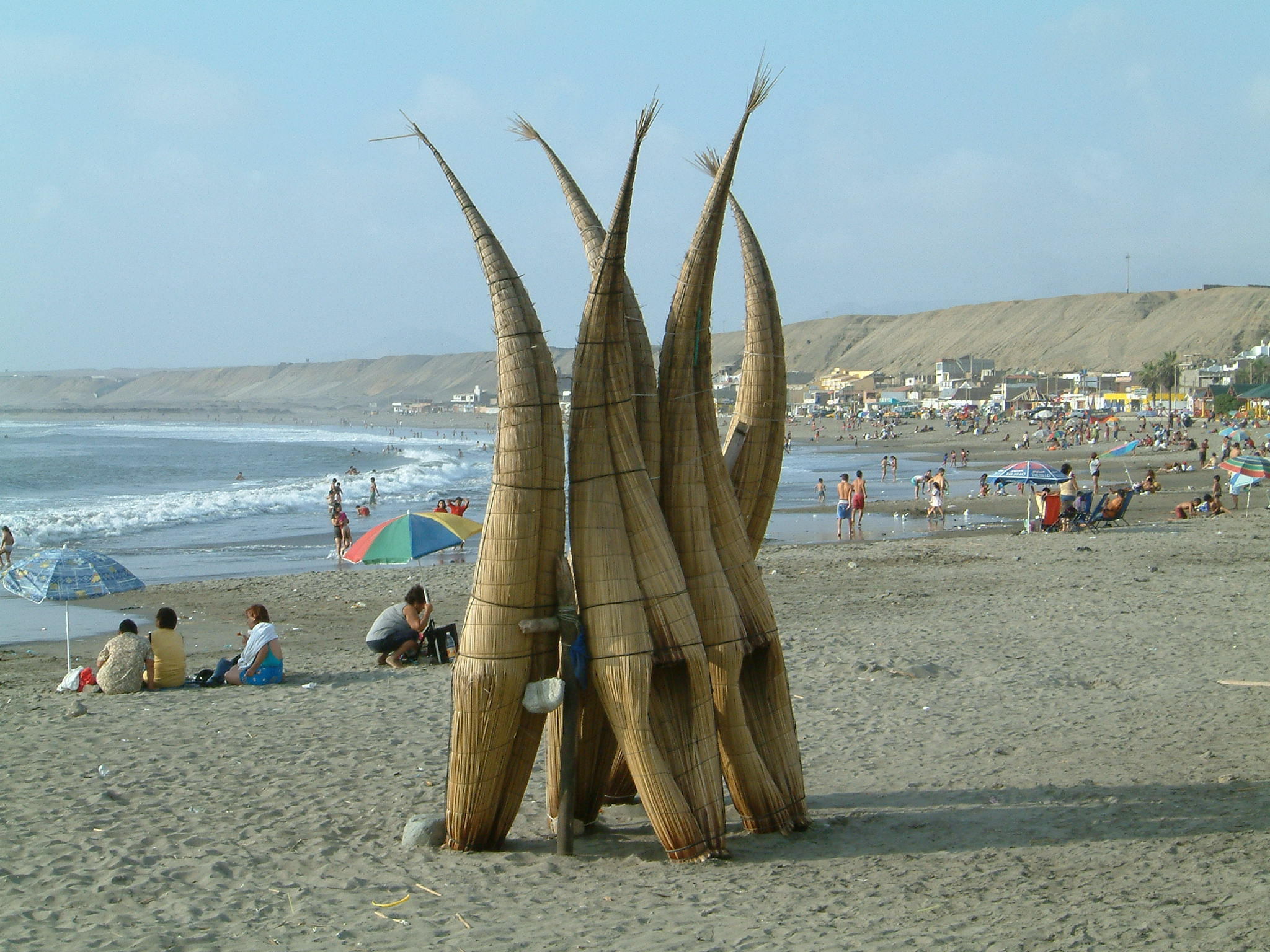
Caballito de totora in the Peruvian beach of Huanchaco.

In 1987, archaeologists, alerted by the local police, discovered the first intact Moche tomb at Sipán in northern Peru. Inside the tomb, which was carbon dated to about 300 AD, the archaeologists found the mummified remains of a high ranking male, the Lord of Sipán. Also in the tomb were the remains of six other individuals, several animals, and a large variety of ornamental and functional items, many of which were made of gold, silver, and other valuable materials. Continuing excavations of the site have yielded thirteen additional tombs.

In 2005, a mummified Moche woman known as the Lady of Cao was discovered at the Huaca Cao Viejo, part of the El Brujo archaeological site on the outskirts of present-day Trujillo, Peru. It is the best preserved Moche mummy found to date; the elaborate tomb that housed her had unprecedented decoration. Archaeologists believe that the tomb had been undisturbed since approximately 450 AD. The tomb contained military and ornamental artifacts, including war clubs and spear throwers. The remains of a garroted teenage girl, probably a servant, were also found in the tomb. News of the discovery was announced by Peruvian and U.S. archaeologists in collaboration with National Geographic in May 2006.

In 2005 an elaborate gold mask thought to depict a sea god, with curving rays radiating from a stone-inlaid feline face, was recovered in London by the Metropolitan Police. Experts believe that the artifact had been looted in the late 1980s from an elite tomb at the Moche site of La Mina. It was returned to Peru in 2006.

In 2013 archaeologists unearthed the eighth of a series of finds of female skeleton that started with the Lady of Cao, together taken as evidence that the Moche were ruled by a succession of priestesses-queens. According to project director Luis Jaime Castillo, "[the] find makes it clear that women didn't just run rituals in this area but governed here and were queens of Moche society". This discovery was made at the large archaeological site of San José de Moro, located close to the town of Chepen, in the Sechura Desert of the Jequetepeque Valley, in La Libertad Region, Peru.

== The error of the term "Mochica culture" ==
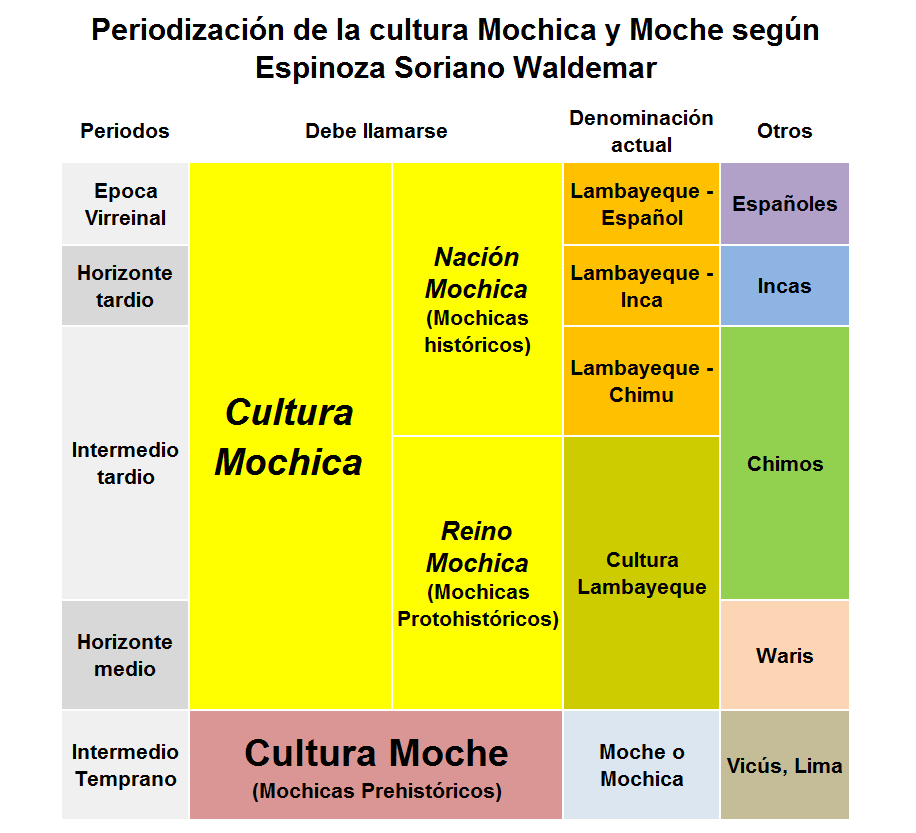
Table summarizing the argument of Waldemar Espinoza Soriano

The prestigious historian Waldemar Espinoza Soriano concludes that the Moche culture should not be called "Mochica"; that this term is exclusive to the Lambayeque culture. This would avoid errors and mistakes in Andean ethnohistory.

Calling the makers of the highly praised huacos-portraits the Mochica culture is as erroneous as if today we wanted to call the people who built Chavín the "Aymara Culture."

— Espinoza (1975, p. 248)

== See also ==
- Chimu Empire, heavily influenced inheritors of the Moche
- Cultural periods of Peru
- El Señor de Sipán (the Lord of Sipán)
- Lord of Úcupe
- Moche Crawling Feline
- Vista Alegre, Trujillo
- Víctor Larco
- Buenos Aires, Trujillo
- Moche, Trujillo (Moche City)
- Viracocha
- Virú culture
