= Pañamarca =

Archaeological site in Peru

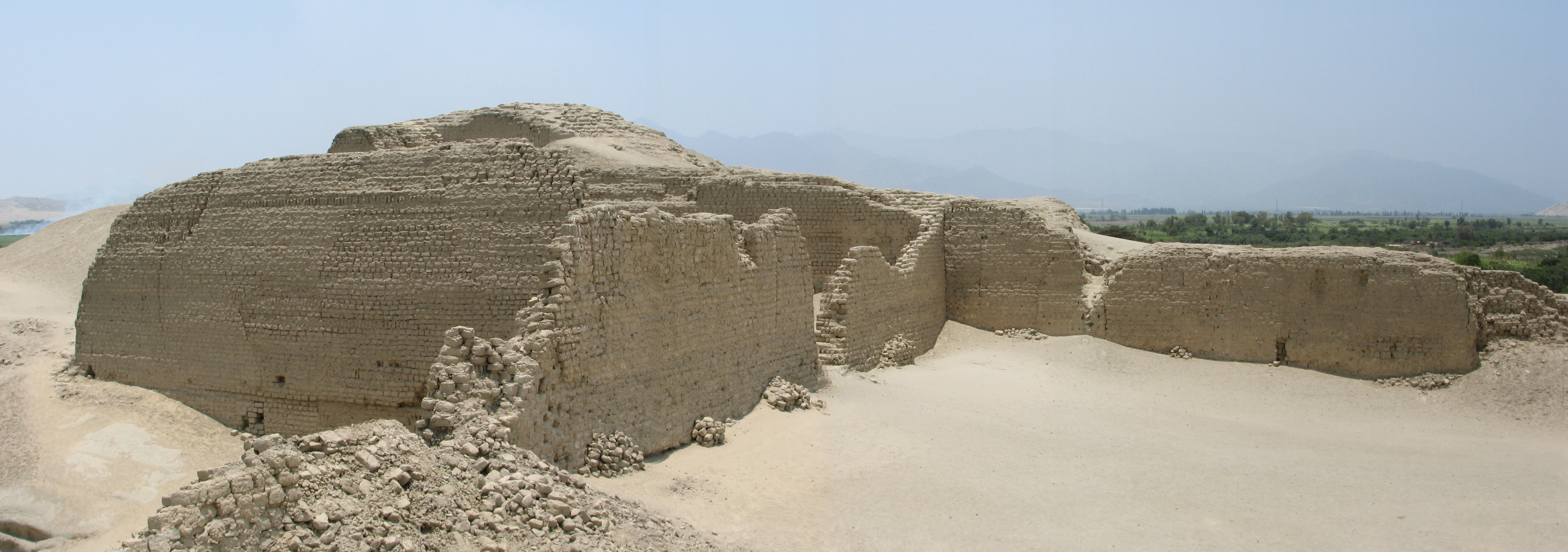
- Partial view of Pañamarca

- Location within Peru
- 9°12′32″S 78°22′22″W
- Location: Peru, Ancash Region

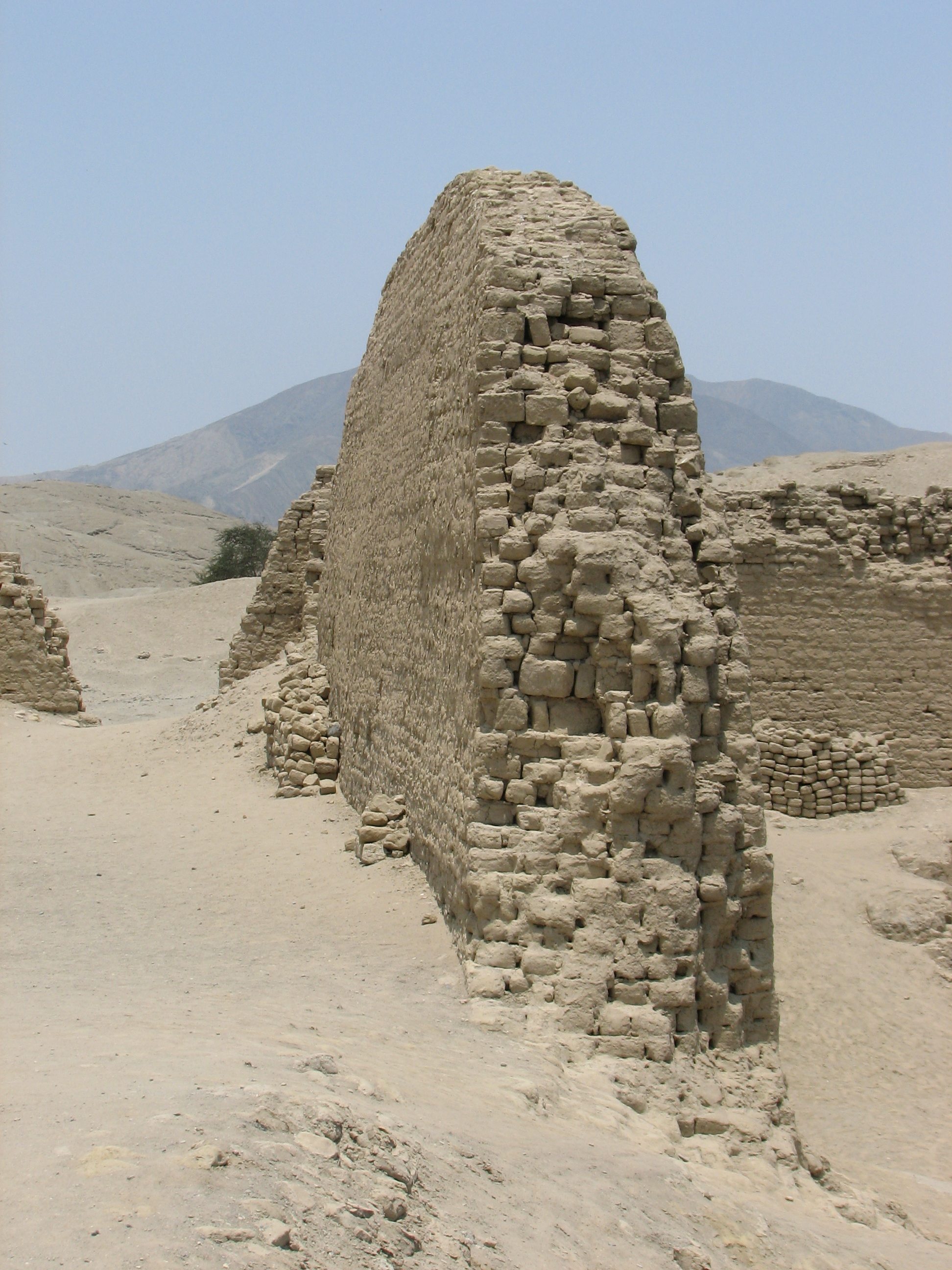
Pañamarca archaeological site – wall

Pañamarca (possibly from Quechua paña, "right hand, on the right", marka "village") is an archaeological site in the Ancash Region in Peru. It is situated in the Santa Province, Nepeña District, on the right bank of the Nepeña River. An aspect of this archaeological site that is not well known is that this site is home to many artifacts that link back to the Incan Empire. This site is also linked with the Moche culture and together, this site was occupied by two civilizations, the Inca and the Moche, which is significant because the archaeology that is present at the site shows that the site was important in the eyes of multiple cultures.

While Pañamarka may at one time have been quite aesthetically pleasing and grand, it is but a small collection of ruined walls, rock, and sand today. However, excavations by the Peruvian and American researchers in 2024 uncovered spectacular mural paintings, including a lavishly decorated Throne Room (dedicated to a female figure, possibly a queen or a political leader) and a so-called Hall of the Braided Serpents

== Pañamarca and the Moche ==
=== Shields, war clubs, and weapon bundles ===
The Moche culture (100 AD – 700 AD) occupied the site of Pañamarca during the late period of the Moche, from 600 AD to the end of the Moche. During that period of acquisition the Moche left behind valuable artifacts that were a window into what the Moche were like. The artifacts they left behind were handmade shields woven with fibrous plants. These shields had a burlap-like material with decorations on the front facing side of the shield. "The shield seems to have been left as an offering that preceded a renovation of the painted temple during the late Moche period (c.600–850 C.E.)." Presumably these shields would have been used in religious and or militaristic ceremonies, yet this does not discount the concept that they were exclusively employed in displays of pageantry. Even in the most devastating of military campaigns the formalities of battlefield action, official dress and regalia, and the brandishing of national colors and symbols were ritualized. The shield implies that an object of its kind could transcend its defensive function and become an abstract symbol, potent within Moche ritual. Moche shields and war clubs were primary elements of the weapon bundle motif which was ubiquitous in Moche arts, especially during the Middle Moche (c. 400 C.E.) and beyond. The panoply was oft to also incorporate spear throwers, darts, and at times the garments of fallen warriors. By the Late Moche period, the weapon bundle became one of the most important symbols in Moche art. The club and shield motif was so important that it became a kind of logo for the Moche culture, and the trophy bundles of the defeated warriors' weapons and clothes became an "iconic, summarizing symbol" for the military focused Moche ideology. The discovery of the Moche feathered shield makes clear that, despite great loss from centuries of extensive looting, neglect, and environmental catastrophe, all has not been lost at Pañamarca.

=== Mural paintings ===
In addition, several important mural paintings (ca. 500–900 CE) were excavated at the site, which possess mimetic images that participated in the performance and perpetuation of Moche religious and political identity on the region’s southern margin. The paintings were modeled on images found on portable objects, such as ceramic vases and or tapestries, and were most likely not created by teams of mural painters who would have been dispatched form other sites. Furthermore, it is theorized that these newly discovered Moche mural paintings possess phenomenological effects and performance capabilities that connect with the site’s Ceremonial Plaza, Platform II, and newly discovered Recinto de los Pilares Pintados (Enclosure of the Painted Pillars). These temple paintings would have served to model ritual behavior and embody religious doctrine as they effectively participated in the substantiation of the late Moche presence at the southern frontier. In addition, a few of the murals uncovered at the site are indicative of Inca design. According to the individuals who participated in the excavation of these murals, the understanding of the memory and reception of these important early paintings will be enhanced by ongoing technical studies of an organic residue splashed upon them in antiquity within the coming years.
