= Lord of Úcupe =

Elite Moche burial discovered at Huaca el Pueblo, Peru

The Lord of Úcupe (Spanish: Señor de Úcupe) is the modern name given to the principal occupant of an elite Moche burial discovered in 2008 at Huaca el Pueblo, near modern Úcupe in the Zaña Valley on the north coast of Peru. The burial dates to about the 5th century CE. Because the tomb was recovered with a large assemblage of regalia, metalwork, shell ornaments and ceramics, it has become an important case in the study of Moche funerary ritual, elite iconography and political organization.

== Discovery ==
The burial was discovered in 2008 by Steve Bourget and Bruno Alva Meneses during excavations at Huaca el Pueblo in the Zaña Valley. The funerary chamber dated to about the 5th century and had been inserted into an older part of the temple during a major renovation, rather than forming part of the architectural unit originally under study.

The discovery drew attention because the tomb was both rich and relatively well preserved. In 2010, Archaeology included it in its annual review of major discoveries.

== Burial ==
The tomb contained the remains of a high-ranking individual accompanied by three other people: two men and a woman who was about six months pregnant. The principal burial was enclosed in a funerary bundle, or fardo. More than 200 objects were recovered from the chamber, including about 170 items of gilded or silvered copper, gold or silver, marine-shell ornaments, ceramic vessels and sacrificed llamas.

Among the most notable finds were funerary masks, crowns, diadems, nose ornaments, shell pectorals, silver rattles and metal elements attached to the burial bundle. A study examined one of the funerary masks from the tomb, analysing both the metal alloy and the adhesive used for its inlaid eyes.

== Iconography and interpretation ==
The regalia from the tomb has figured in interpretations of Moche rulership and ritual. Some diadems and crowns from the burial depict the triad of the owl, spider and octopus, motifs associated with capture, ceremonial combat and human sacrifice in Moche visual culture.

Ten of the Lord of Úcupe's diadems resemble the one worn by the seated figure in scenes of the Sacrifice Ceremony. On that reading, the burial may belong to a ruler represented in Moche ritual iconography as the recipient of the blood of sacrificed captives.

Archaeology reported that the regalia from the tomb closely resembled elite material from Sipán, which Steve Bourget interpreted as evidence of political ties between major Moche centres. A later biodistance study in Latin American Antiquity compared inherited dental traits among individuals buried at Sipán, Úcupe and Dos Cabezas. The authors concluded that, although biological and material evidence linked the Lord of Úcupe to Dos Cabezas, many objects in the tomb showed participation in the world of Sipán's elites; they argued that the evidence supported a model of several interconnected Moche polities rather than a single centralized state.

== Conservation and exhibition ==
After excavation, the finds were placed in a secure, climate-controlled storage space at the Royal Tombs of Sipán Museum in Lambayeque, where restoration work began almost immediately, lasting about four years.

Objects from the burial formed the basis of the exhibition Les rois mochica. Divinité et pouvoir dans le Pérou ancien, held at the Musée d'ethnographie de Genève from 1 November 2014 to 3 May 2015. The exhibition presented the Úcupe material as its central case study and displayed nearly 300 objects connected with Moche rulership, ritual and funerary practice.

== See also ==
- Moche culture
- Sipán
- Dos Cabezas
- Royal Tombs of Sipán Museum
