= John Verano =

John Verano is a professor of anthropology at Tulane University. He received his B.A. from Stanford University in 1977 in anthropology. He then went on to the University of California, Los Angeles to receive his M.A. in 1980 and his Ph.D. in 1987.

John Verano does field research in Peru. One notable discovery was of a female warrior from the Moche culture. He has aided National Geographic in producing documentaries on the ritualistic sacrifices of the Moche people.
