= Salinar culture =

Archaeological culture of Ancient Peru

Salinar
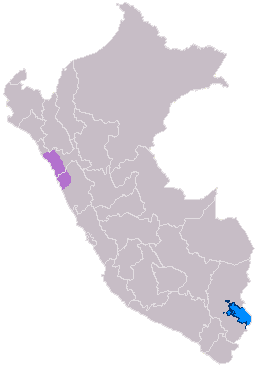
- Map of the Salinar culture
- Geographical range: Ancash
- Period: Early Intermediate
- Dates: c. 200 BCE - 300 CE
- Type site: Cerro Arena
- Preceded by: Casma–Sechin, Chavín
- Followed by: Moche, Virú

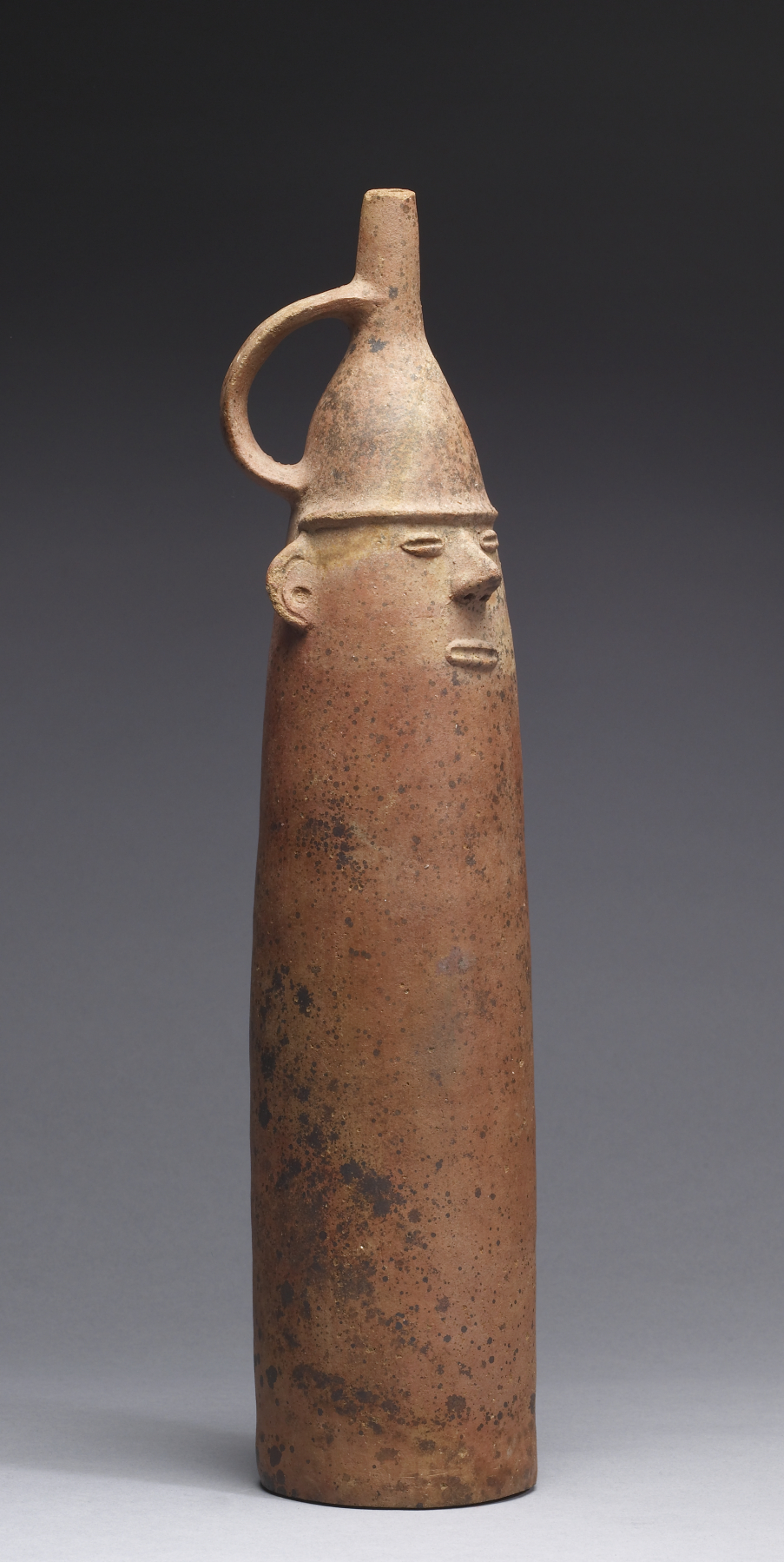
Salinar ceramic in the form of a bottle

Salinar is an archaeological culture of Ancient Peru that developed in the coastal area of Ancash and La Libertad.

When the Chavín culture declined, on the north coast, small lordships that were in contact united and formed the Salinar culture, which began between 500 and 200 BCE and ended around 300 CE. This culture is the one that marked the transition between the Chavin culture and the advent of the Mochica culture. During this time, irrigation systems were expanded, significantly increasing the agricultural area. The settlements were generally small and isolated, but there are sites of urban proportions, such as Cerro Arena in the Moche Valley, an extensive site with about 2000 stone structures distributed over a surface of 2 km2, where there are habitation areas, ceremonial and administrative centers. The culture built fortifications to protect the towns on the highest part of the hills, which indicates extensive wars during the existence of this culture, ones where all the people intervened.

They used hand-shaped odontiform adobes in their construction, houses were generally square in plan with low walls and wooden columns. Graves took an elongated ellipsoid shape; corpses were spread out with their legs crossed and their bodies reclined to the right, wrapped in cloth and covered with jewels and ceramic offerings, and almost always with a gold foil in their mouths.

Salinarian ceramic presented a change from black ceramic to red ceramic with white paint. Bottles with stirrup handles were found alongside the innovative figurine bottles with bridge handles. The first erotic representations appear among the modeled vessels. Salinarians mined copper and alloyed it with gold.

== Sources ==
- Larco Hoyle R. 1966. Pérou. Genéve.
- Towle M. A. 1961. The Ethnobotany of Pre-Columbian Peru. — VFPA, № 30.
- The Salinar Culture
