= Mount Taylor period =

Archaeological culture in Florida, US

The Mount Taylor period or Mount Taylor culture was a pre-ceramic archaeological culture in northeastern Florida in the middle to late Archaic period. The Mount Taylor period lasted from approximately 5000 or 4000 BCE to 2000 BCE. Most archaeological sites associated with the culture are in the middle and upper parts of the St. Johns River valley, with related sites occurring along the east coast of Florida, and at a few other places in Florida. The Mount Taylor culture emerged from the regionally undifferentiated middle Archaic culture in Florida, and was succeeded by the late Archaic Orange period.

The Mount Taylor period is named after the Mount Taylor site (8VO19), a large shell midden on the St. Johns River in northwestern Volusia County, Florida. The absence of ceramics in the lowest levels of the Mount Taylor midden was noted in the late 19th century by C. B. Moore. Archaeologists working in the first half of the 20th century established that ceramic-free layers existed in many middens and mounds in eastern Florida. John Goggin defined the Mount Taylor period to cover a number of middens and mounds in northeastern Florida that lacked ceramics, but had similar artifact assemblages. Later workers have set 5000 to 4000 BCE as the beginning of the period. The appearance of fiber-tempered ceramics in eastern Florida around 4000 BCE is conventionally taken as marking the end of the Mount Taylor period and the beginning of the Orange period.

Wheeler, et al. identify about 50 sites in the middle and upper St. Johns River valley and the Oklawaha River valley as past of the Mount Taylor period. Another dozen sites around the mouth of the St. Johns River and on coastal lagoons, and a few inland sites, appear to be related to the Mount Taylor period. With few exceptions, dates for coastal sites are confined to the late part of the Mount Taylor period. Sea levels rose quickly during the Mount Taylor period, from about seven meters below 20th century levels about 7,000 ^{14}C years ago to close to current levels 6,000 years ago (sea levels have been both higher and lower than that in the last 6,000 ^{14}C years). Coastal sites from early in the Mount Taylor period may have been drowned or destroyed by the rising sea waters.

Freshwater shellfish were a staple in the diet of the people inhabiting Mount Taylor sites in the St. Johns River valley. Up to 99% of the volume of many Mount Taylor period middens consists of snail shells (including river snails and apple snails). Freshwater mussels were also consumed, and mussel shells are the primary component of some Mount Taylor middens. The snail shells deposited in individual Mount Taylor middens decreased in size over time, indicating that consumption outpaced natural increase. The communities probably relocated to new sites when the size of harvested snails dropped too low. Coastal sites related to the Mount Taylor period have middens consisting primarily of oyster and coquina shells, with some dwarf surf clam shells.

Burials in mounds from the later part of the Mount Taylor period have been found in several sites dating 4,600 to 5,600 years ago (Beasley has proposed separating a Thornhill Lake period from the Mount Taylor period to recognize this development). These burials mounds are among the oldest known in Florida.
