= Mount Taylor =

Mount Taylor may refer to:

Australia

- Mount Taylor (Australian Capital Territory)
- Mount Taylor Conservation Park, Kangaroo Island, South Australia
- Mount Taylor, a locality north of Bairnsdale, Victoria

Canada

- Mount Taylor (British Columbia)
- Mount Taylor (Yukon)

New Zealand

- Mount Taylor, Feilding, New Zealand

USA

- Mount Taylor (Florida)
- Mount Taylor (New Mexico)
- Mount Taylor (Nevada)

Elsewhere

- Mount Taylor (Antarctica)
