= Mount Taylor (Florida) =

Archaeological site in Florida, US

- U.S. National Register of Historic Places
- Location within Volusia County
- Location: Volusia County, Florida
- Nearest city: DeBary
- Coordinates: 28.88°N 81.31°W
- Built: approx. 4,000 B.C. – 2,000 B.C.
- NRHP reference No.: 97001219
- Added to NRHP: October 8, 1997

Mount Taylor (8VO19)is an archaeological site near DeBary, Florida. It is the eponym for the Mount Taylor period, a pre-ceramic archaeological culture that flourished in the middle and upper St. Johns River valley and, to a lesser extent, along the middle and upper Atlantic Coast of Florida, from about 6,000 years Before Present (BP) to about 4,000 years BP (4000 BCE to 2000 BCE). On October 8, 1997, it was added to the U.S. National Register of Historic Places.
