= Orange period =

Archaeological culture in Florida, US

The Orange period or Orange culture was a late-Archaic archaeological culture along the eastern side of the Florida peninsula, from about 4,000 years ago to about 2,500 or 3,000 years ago. The Orange period is largely defined by the presence of Orange-series fiber-tempered pottery.

During the middle to late Archaic period, sea level rise slowed and approached contemporary levels. Barrier islands and lagoons formed along much of the coast of Florida, and the gradient of the St. Johns River decreased, creating a string of wetlands in its valley. Relatively large sedentary populations exploited the resources of these new coastal and riverine wetlands in Florida, while drier regions were only lightly exploited. Distinguishable regional culture varieties began developing in the wetland areas. The pre-ceramic Mount Taylor period emerged along the east coast of Florida and in the drainage of the St. Johns River around 5000 to 4000 BCE. Fiber-tempered pottery, which had developed in the Stallings culture area of Georgia and South Carolina around 2500 BCE, appeared in Florida around 2000 BCE, marking the beginning of the Orange period. The Orange culture area extended throughout the St.Johns River watershed, and along the Florida coast from north of the mouth of the St. Johns River to the vicinity of Sebastian, Florida. After 1,000 to 1,500 years, the Orange culture developed into the St. Johns culture. The sequence of Mount Taylor-Orange-St. Johns cultures in northeastern Florida developed in place. The division into cultures is based on the lack of ceramics in the Mount Taylor period, the presence of fiber-tempered ceramics in the Orange period, and the presence of sand- and/or sponge spicule-tempered ceramics in the St. Johns period.

== Orange-series pottery ==
The Orange period or culture is defined by the presence of Orange-series ceramics. Ripley P. Bullen classified Orange-series pottery into five chronological periods, based on shape, decoration, method of construction (hand-shaped or coiled), and the presence of other tempers besides fiber. Discoveries such as additional radiocarbon dating and analysis of Orange-series that were made since the early 1990s support an alternative interpretation, in which variations between vessels represent regional variations rather than a temporal sequence. Kenneth Sassaman suggests that St. Johns pottery may have appeared along the middle St. Johns River near the beginning of the Orange period, 3,500 ^{14}C years Before Present, well before the previously accepted date of 1000 to 500 BCE.
