= Julia Isídrez =

Paraguayan ceramist

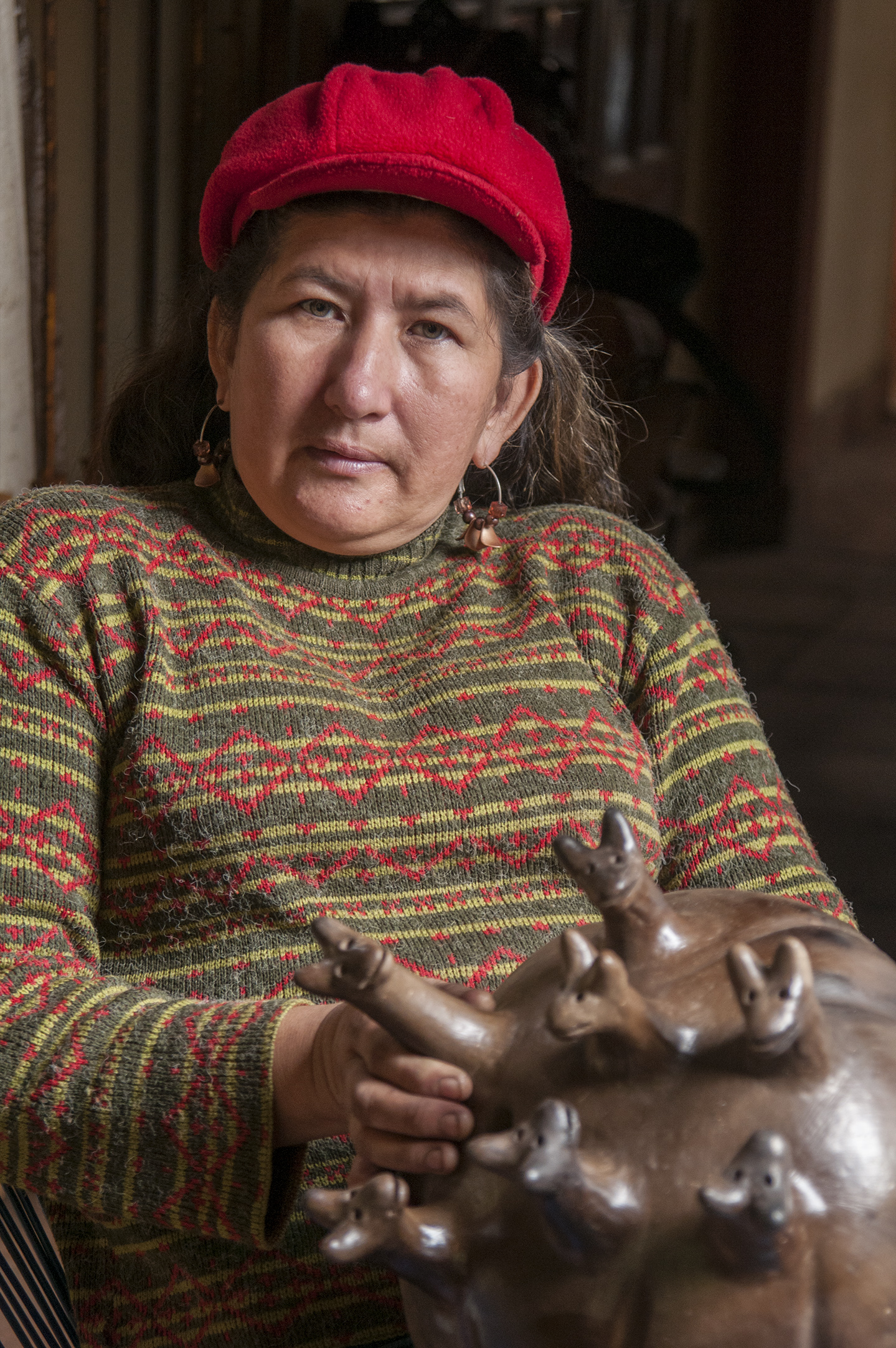
Julia Isídrez in 2009

Julia Isídrez is a Paraguayan ceramist.

== Life ==
Isídrez was born on February 16, 1967, in Itá in the Central Department, a city that is also nicknamed the Capital of Ceramics.

Isídrez originates from a family of ceramists, and was educated in this profession by her mother Juana Marta Rodas, who had learned it from her mother and grandmother. Ceramic art in Paraguay is principally practiced by women and comes forth from the pre-colonial pottery tradition. During several decades she worked closely with her mother, with whom she exhibited in her own country and abroad. They received many international awards.

Isídrez' work should be classified as modern art, and is characterized by traditional pottery of the countryside with exotic Jesuit and contemporary techniques.

Around 2010, she separated from her mother in a professional sense. In that particular year she held the exposition Paraguay Esquivo in Paris with Ediltrudis Noguera.

== Expositions ==
The art of Isídrez and Rodas was shown on many expositions in Paraguay and abroad. Here follows a selection:

- 1976. Gallery van the UNESCO, Paris
- 1992 and 1993: Gallery Fábrica, Asunción
- 1994: Salon of the Biennale Martel, Cultural City Center, Asunción
- 1995: Gallery Lamarca, Asunción
- 1995: Center of Visual Arts, Museo del Barro, Asunción
- 1996: Gallery Fábrica, Asunción
- 1997: Gallery Lamarca, Asunción
- 1998 and 1999: Center of Visual Arts, Museo del Barro, Asunción
- 1999: Biennale of the Mercosur, Porto Alegre
- 2007: 16th international year fair ARte COntemporáneo (ARCO), Madrid
- 2008: 35th international exhibition of traditional art, Pontifical Catholic University of Chile, Santiago
- 2009: Museum of Contemporary Crafts Art of Chile, Santiago

Independent and/or with others:

- 2010: Centro Cultural del Lago, Areguá
- 2010-2011: Paraguay Esquivo, Maisondes Cultures du Monde à Vitré, Paris, with Ediltrudis Noguera.

== Awards ==
Isídrez received many awards in the period she worked with her mother:

- 1994: Grand Prize, Biennale of Martel for Visual Arts, Cultural City Center, Asunción
- 1998: Prize of the city of Madrid
- 1999: Prince Claus Award
- 1999: Award for Best Craft Artist of the UNESCO, the Central Department and the society Hecho à Mano
- 2001: First Prize in Traditional Art, Cooperativa Universitaria
- 2008: Lorenzo Berg Salvo Prize, Pontifical Catholic University of Chile, Santiago
- 2009: Grand Cross of the National Order of Merit, France
