= Ceramics of Indigenous peoples of the Americas =

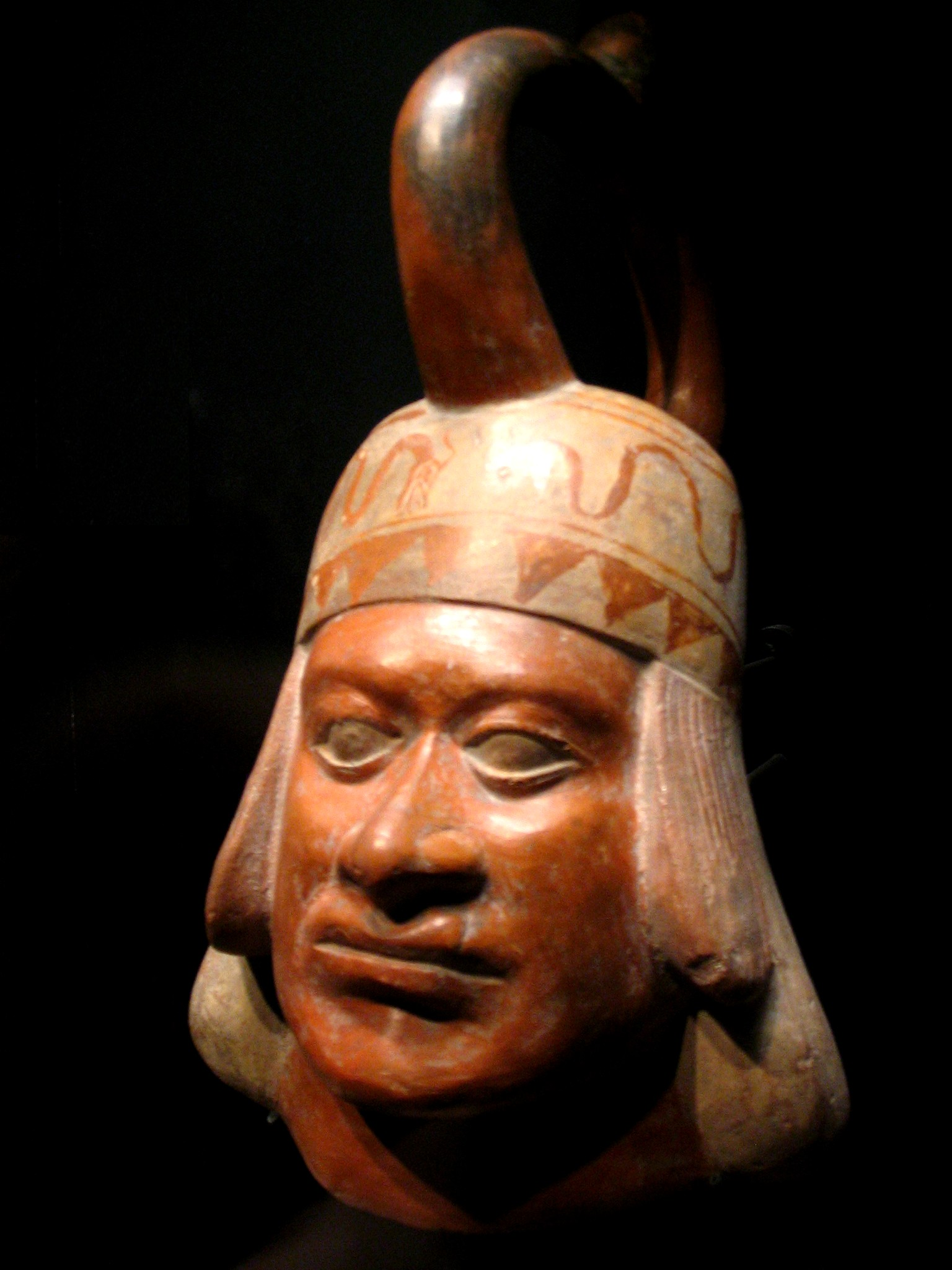
Moche portrait vessel, Musée du quai Branly, ca. 100—700 CE, 16 x 29 x 22 cm

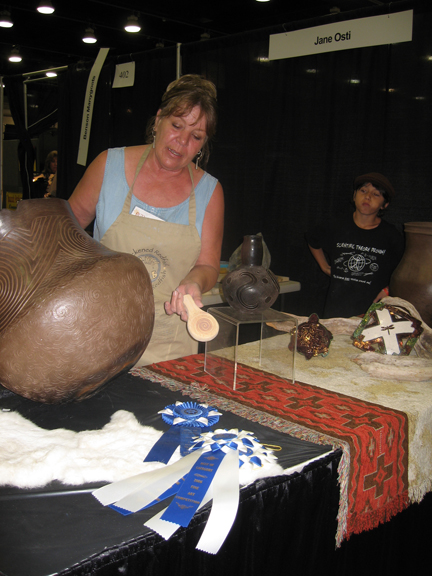
Jane Osti (Cherokee Nation), with her award-winning pottery, 2006

Ceramics of Indigenous peoples of the Americas is an art form with at least a 7500-year history in the Americas. Pottery is fired ceramics with clay as a component. Ceramics are used for utilitarian cooking vessels, serving and storage vessels, pipes, funerary urns, censers, musical instruments, ceremonial items, masks, toys, sculptures, and a myriad of other art forms.

Due to their resilience, ceramics have been key to learning more about pre-Columbian Indigenous cultures.

== Materials and techniques ==
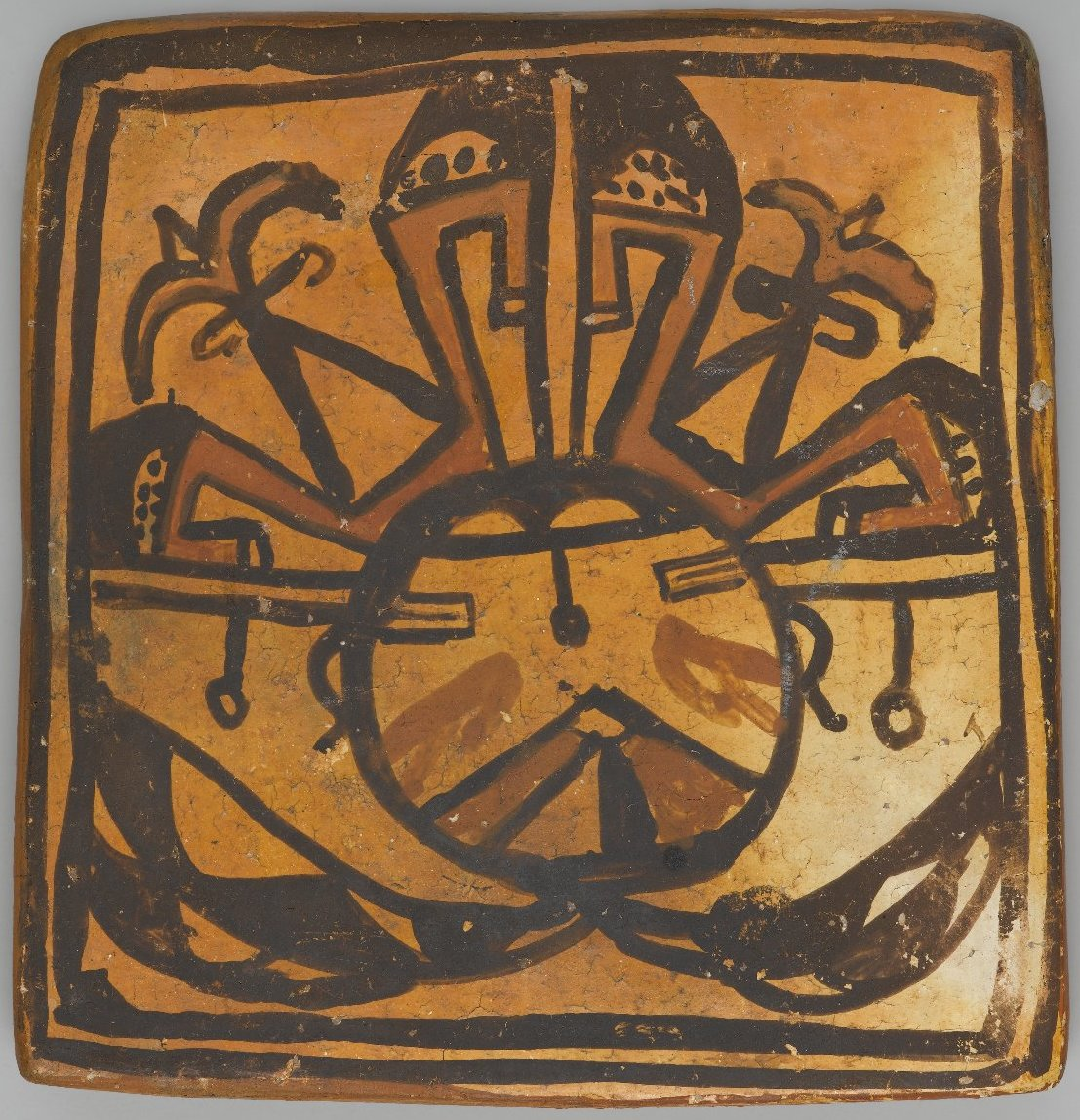
Tile, Hopi Pueblo (Native American), late 19th-early 20th century, Brooklyn Museum

The clay body is a necessary component of pottery. Clay must be mined and purified in an often laborious process, and certain tribes have ceremonial protocols to gathering clay. Different tribes have different processes for processing clay, which can include drying in the sun, soaking in water for days, and repeatedly running through a screen or sieve. Acoma and other Pueblo pottery traditionally pound dry clay into a powder and then remove impurities by hand, then running the dry powder through a screen, mixing it with a dry temper, and then mixing water to create a plastic paste. In preparing the clay, potters spend hours wedging it to remove air pockets and humidity that could easily cause it to explode during firing. The clay then needs to "cure" over time.

Coiling is the most common means of shaping ceramics in the Americas. In coiling, the clay is rolled into a long, thin strands that are coiled upon each other to build up the shape of the pottery. While the potter builds the coils up, she also blends them together until there was no trace of the ropes of clay entwined to form the pot, no deviation in the thickness of the walls, and therefore no weaknesses. Potter's wheels were not used prior to European contact and are only used today by a limited number of Native American artists. Pinch pots and other small clay objects could be formed directly by hand. Hohokam potters and their descendants in the American Southwest employed the paddle-and-anvil technique, in which the interior clay wall of a pot was supported by an anvil, while the exterior was beaten with a paddle, smoothing the surface. In precontact South America, ceramics were mass-produced using molds.

Slip is a liquid clay suspension of mineral pigments applied to the ceramics before firing. Slips are typically red, buff, white, and black; however, Nazca culture ceramic artists in Peru perfected 13 distinct colors of slips. They also used a hand-rotated turntable that allowed all sides of a ceramic piece to be painted with ease. These were first used in 500 BCE and continue to be used today. Slips can be applied overall in washes, creating large color fields, often with cloth, or they can be painted in fine detail with brushes. Yucca leaves, chewed slightly to loosen fibers, make excellent brushes that are still in use today in the American Southwest. Negative painting is a technique employed by precontact Mississippian potters in the Eastern Woodlands, Mayan potters in Mesoamerica, and others, which involves covering the ceramic piece in beeswax or another resist, incising a design in the resist, then soaking the piece with a slip. In the firing process the resists melts away, leaving the colored design.

While still green, pottery can be incised with designs. Cords, textiles, baskets, and corncobs have been rolled over wet clay, both as a decoration and to improve heat dispersion in cooking pots. Carved wood or ceramic stamping paddles are used throughout the Southeastern Woodlands to create repeating designs. Clay can also be added to the main ceramic structure to build up designs.

Before firing, ceramics can be burnished or polished to a fine sheen with a smooth instrument, usually a stone. Glazes are seldom used by Indigenous American ceramic artists. Grease can be rubbed onto the pot as well.

Prior to contact, pottery was usually open-air fired or pit fired; precontact Indigenous peoples of Mexico used kilns extensively. Today many Native American ceramic artists use kilns. In pit-firing, the pot is placed in a shallow pit dug into the earth along with other unfired pottery, covered with wood and brush, or dung, then set on fire whereupon it can harden at temperatures of 1400 degrees or more. Finally, the ceramics surface is often polished with smooth stones.

=== Tempers ===
Tempers are non-plastic materials added to clay to prevent shrinkage and cracking during drying and firing of vessels made from the clay. Tempers may include:

- Bone;
- Chaff;
- Charcoal;
- Wood ash (cariapé);
- Grit;
- Sand, crushed sandstone;
- Crushed limestone;
- Crushed igneous rocks, such as volcanic rock, feldspar, or mica;
- Grog;
- Plant fiber;
- Mollusc shells, freshwater and marine (sometimes fossilized), crushed;
- Freshwater sponge spicules.

Not all Indigenous American pottery requires added tempers; some Hopi potters use pure kaolin clay that does not require tempering. Some clays naturally contain enough temper that they do not required additional tempers. This includes mica or sand in clays used in some Taos Pueblo, Picuris Pueblo, and Hopi pottery, and sponge spicules in the clay used to produce the "chalky ware" of the St. Johns culture.

Ceramics are often used to identify archaeological cultures. The type of temper (or mix of tempers) used helps to distinguish the ceramics produced by different cultures during particular time periods. For example, the Hohokam used schist containing silver mica as a temper in their plainware; the shiny particles of the mica gave the pottery a mystical shimmer. Grog, sand, and sandstone were all used by Ancestral Pueblo people and other Southwestern cultures. Crushed bone was used as temper in at least some ceramics at a number of sites in Texas. In the Southeastern United States, the earliest ceramics were tempered with fiber such as Spanish moss and palmetto leaves. In Louisiana, fiber as tempering was replaced first by grog and later by shell. In peninsular Florida and coastal Georgia sand replaced fiber as tempering. Still later, freshwater sponge spicules became an important temper in the "chalky ware" of the St. Johns culture in northeastern Florida. Locally produced ceramics of the Lucayan people in the Bahamas were characterized by crushed conch shell tempering, as opposed to the quartz sand-tempered ware imported from Hispaniola.

The choice of temper used in ceramics was constrained by what was available, but changes in the choice of temper can provide clues to influence and trade relations between groups. Shell-tempered ware was produced sporadically in various places across the eastern United States, but in the late Woodland and early Mississippian periods it became the predominant temper used across much of the Mississippi Valley and middle Gulf coast, and a major defining characteristic of Mississippian culture pottery.

== Origin and spread ==
The earliest ceramics known from the Americas have been found in the lower Amazon Basin. Ceramics from the Caverna da Pedra Pintada, near Santarém, Brazil, have been dated to between 7,500 and 5,000 years ago. Ceramics from Taperinha, also near Santarém, have been dated to 8,000 to 7,000 years ago. Some of the sherds at Taperinho were shell-tempered, which allowed the sherds themselves to be radiocarbon dated. These first ceramics-making cultures were fishers and shellfish-gatherers.

Ceramics appeared next across northern South America and then down the western side of South America and northward through Mesoamerica. Ceramics of the Alaka culture in Guyana have been dated to 6,000 to 4,500 years ago. Ceramics of the San Jacinto culture in Colombia have been dated to about 4530 BCE, and at Puerto Hormiga, also in Colombia, to about 3794 BCE. Ceramics appeared in the Valdivia culture in Ecuador around 3200 BCE, and in the Pandanche culture in Peru around 2460 BCE.

The spread of ceramics in Mesoamerica came later. Ceramics from Monagrillo in Panama have been dated to around 2140 BCE, from Tronadora in Costa Rica to around 1890 BCE, and from Barra in the Soconusco of Chiapas to around 1900 BCE. Ceramics of the Purrón tradition in southcentral Mexico have been dated to around 1805 BCE, and from the Chajil tradition of northcentral Mexico, to around 1600 BCE.

The appearance of ceramics in the Southeastern United States does not fit the above pattern. Ceramics from the middle Savannah River in Georgia and South Carolina (known as Stallings, Stallings Island, or St. Simons) have been dated to about 2888 BCE (4500 BP), and ceramics of the Orange and Norwood cultures in northern Florida to around 2460 BCE (4300 BP) (all older than any other dated ceramics from north of Colombia). Ceramics appeared later elsewhere in North America. Ceramics reached southern Florida (Mount Elizabeth) by 4000 BP, Nebo Hill (in Missouri) by 3700 BP, and Poverty Point (in Louisiana) by 3400 BP.

== Cultural regions ==
=== North America ===
==== Arctic ====
Several Inuit groups, such as the Netsilik, Sadlermiut, Utkuhiksalingmiut, and Caribou Inuit (Qaernerimiut) created utilitarian pottery in historic times, primarily to store food. In Rankin Inlet, Nunavut, Canada, when the mine that employed much of the community closed down, the national government created the Rankin Inlet Ceramics Project, whose wares were successfully exhibited in Toronto in 1967. The project foundered but a local gallery revived interest in Inuit ceramics in the 1990s.

==== Eastern Woodlands ====
- Hopewell pottery is the ceramic tradition of the various local cultures involved in the Hopewell tradition (ca. 200 BCE to 400 CE) and are found as artifacts in archeological sites in the American Midwest and Southeast.
- Mississippian culture pottery is the ceramic tradition of the Mississippian culture (800–1600 CE) found as artifacts in archaeological sites in the American Midwest and Southeast.

==== Southeastern Woodlands ====
Geological studies show that certain areas of the southeastern portion of North America are rich in kaolins and ball clays (Hosterman, USGS), the types of plastic clays best suited for pottery. Clay beds which still produce ceramic clays are from primary and secondary deposits formed in the Late Paleocene and Early Miocene Epochs in formations that formed the Gulf Coastal Plain. According to all geological surveys the entire southeastern portion of the continent has abundant clay deposits, with the exception of all of south Florida and a portion of western central Florida (Calver) (Matson).

Fiber-tempered ceramics associated with shell middens left by Late Archaic hunter-fisher-gatherers appeared in the Atlantic coastal plain of Florida, Georgia and South Carolina starting in 2500 BC. The earliest attested pottery is in the Stallings culture area, around the middle Savannah River. (Note: Fiber-tempered potsherds found at Rabbit Mount near the lower Savannah River in South Carolina have been dated to 4465 ± 95 and 4450 ± 150 radiocarbon years before present.) Fiber-tempered pottery of the Orange culture in northeast Florida has been dated to 2000 BC or a bit earlier. Fiber-tempered pottery of very similar form spread along coasts and river valleys of the Southeastern United States from the Atlantic coast into Alabama, reaching northwestern Florida (Norwood culture) and the Gulf coast by 1300 BC, the interior Middle South by 1100, and Poverty Point by 1000 BC.

Thoms Creek ceramics closely resembled Stallings ceramics, but used more sand and less fiber as temper than Stalling or Orange ware. Thoms Creek ceramics were largely contemporary with Stalling and Orange ceramics, although no Thoms Creek ceramics have been found that are as early as the earliest Stallings. Thoms Creek ceramics overlapped Stallings ceramics in northern Georgia and southern South Carolina, but were the dominant tradition north of the Santee River into North Carolina.

The similarities of the Stallings series ceramics to the earlier Puerto Hormiga ceramics of Colombia, which were both associated with shell rings, and the presence of winds and ocean currents favoring journeys from South America to the Southeastern United States, led James A. Ford, among other archaeologists, to offer the hypothesis that the two areas had connections, and that the technology of fiber-tempered ceramics in the southeastern United States had been imported from Colombia. Other archaeologists have noted that there are no known archaeological sites between Colombia and Florida that are of a type or age consistent with such connections, and that the cultural traditions of the Southeastern United States show no significant changes associated with the appearance of ceramics, indicating that there was no migration or people, and no transfer of technology or other elements of culture, other than the appearance of ceramics.

Later significant developments in ceramics in the Southeastern Woodlands included Mississippian culture pottery in the Mississippi River valley, and Weedon Island pottery, a style of pottery used primarily in ceremonial contexts and high status burials, produced and traded along the Gulf of Mexico coast from southwestern Florida to the Florida panhandle.

- Swift Creek and Santa Rosa culture pottery post Deptford, northwest Florida, ceremonial decorative pottery, 1000 A.D.
- Glade and Belle Glade culture pottery fiber or sand-tempered crude pottery, south Florida to central Florida, 500 BCE until 1700 A.D., reference four periods I, II, III and IV
- Alachua culture pottery northeast, north central Florida, protohistoric period
- Plaquemine culture pottery, ceramics of the Natchez people, a historic tribe known also to be one of the last of the Plaquemine culture chiefdoms in southwestern Mississippi
- Fort Walton culture pottery distinctively Mississippi culture in Florida panhandle, developed out of the Weedon Island culture 1000 A.D.
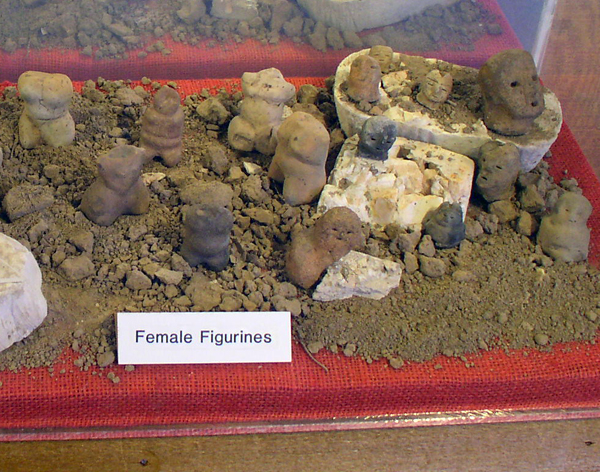
Figurines from Poverty Point

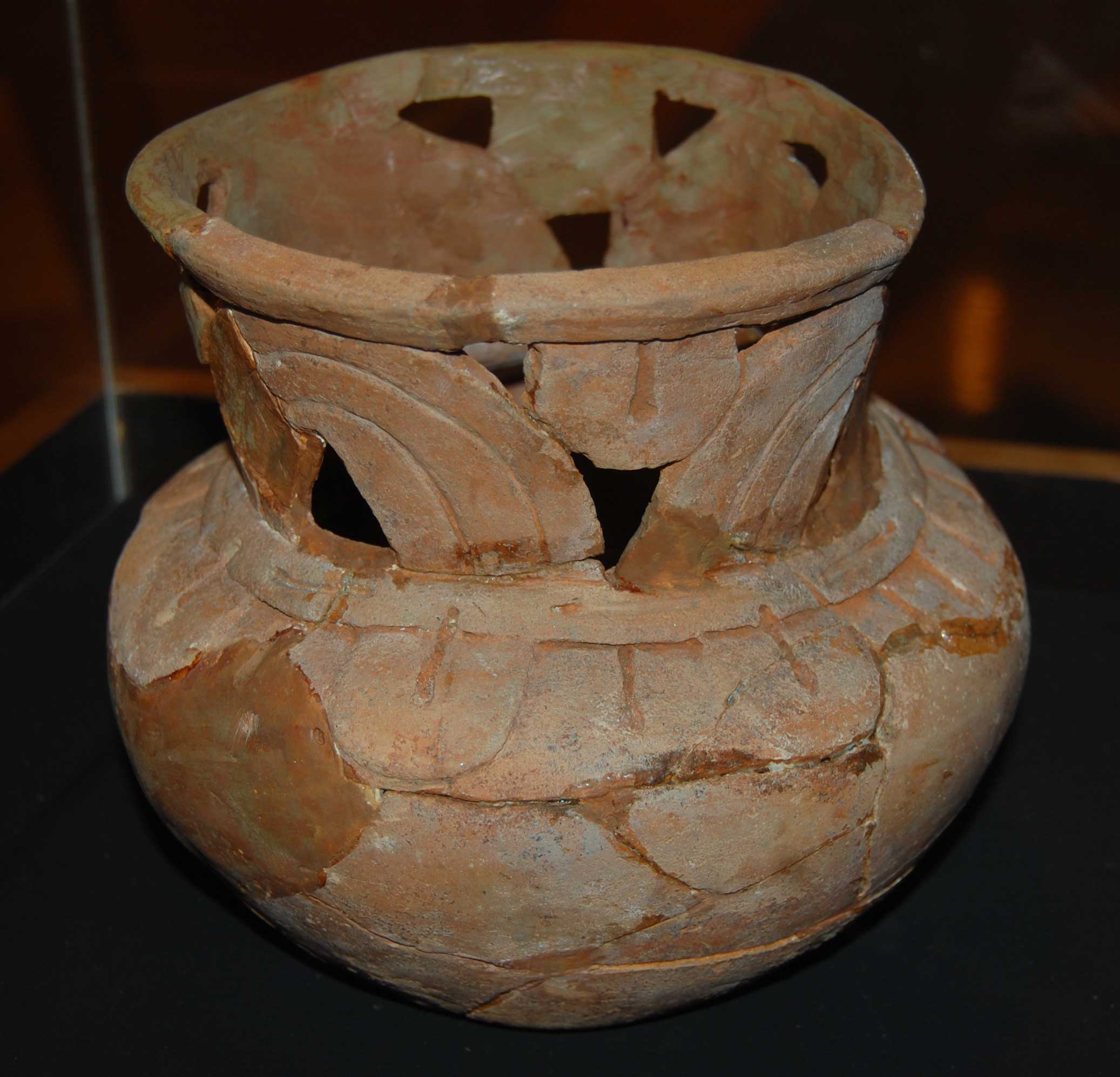
Pot from Kolomoki Mounds

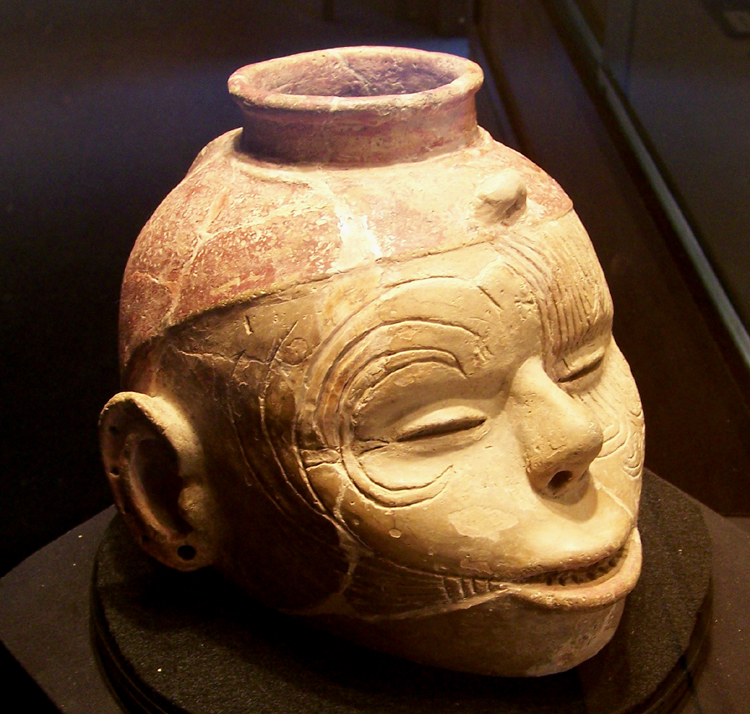
A human head effigy pot from the Mississippian culture

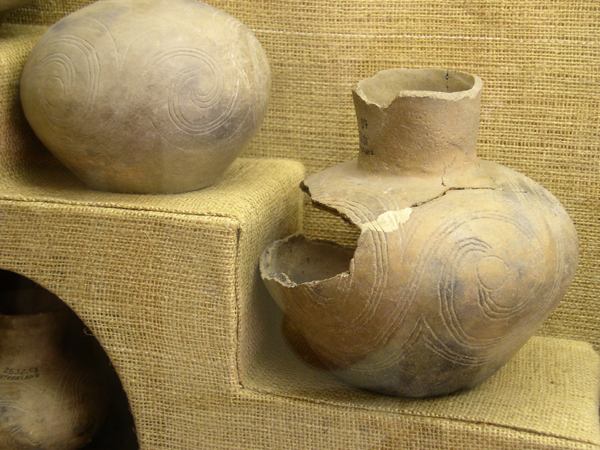
Natchez pots from the Fatherland site

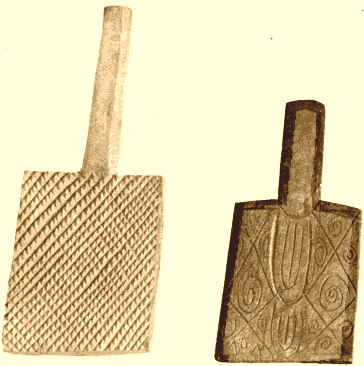
Cherokee stamping paddles, used to imprint designs in pottery

==== Great Basin ====
Indigenous peoples of the Great Basin based their pottery on basketry. The Fremont culture of central Utah (700–1300 CE) developed pottery after adopting agriculture. Paiute and Washoe people in the western Great Basin developed plain, utilitarian ceramics separately, which was not burnished but occasionally featured red painted designs. The Owens Valley Brown Ware is an example of Paiute/Washoe ceramics, which was used for cooking, food storage, and water jugs. The jugs often featured clay handles that accommodated carrying straps.

==== Pueblo cultures ====
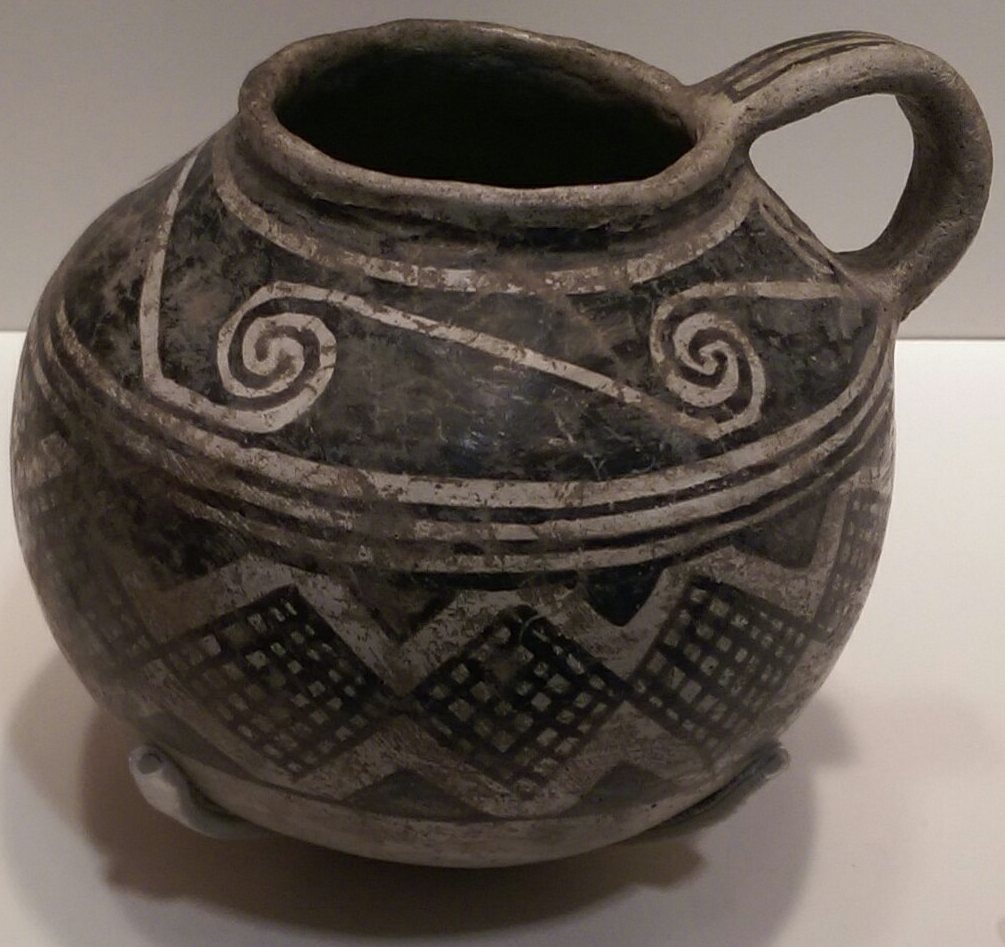
Black-on-white jar, ca. 1100-1300, from Kayenta, Arizona, on display at the California Academy of Sciences

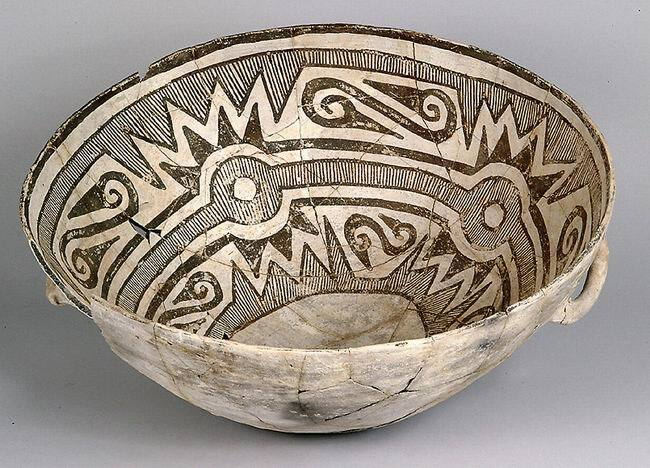
Ceramic bowl from Chaco Canyon in New Mexico, Pueblo III phase

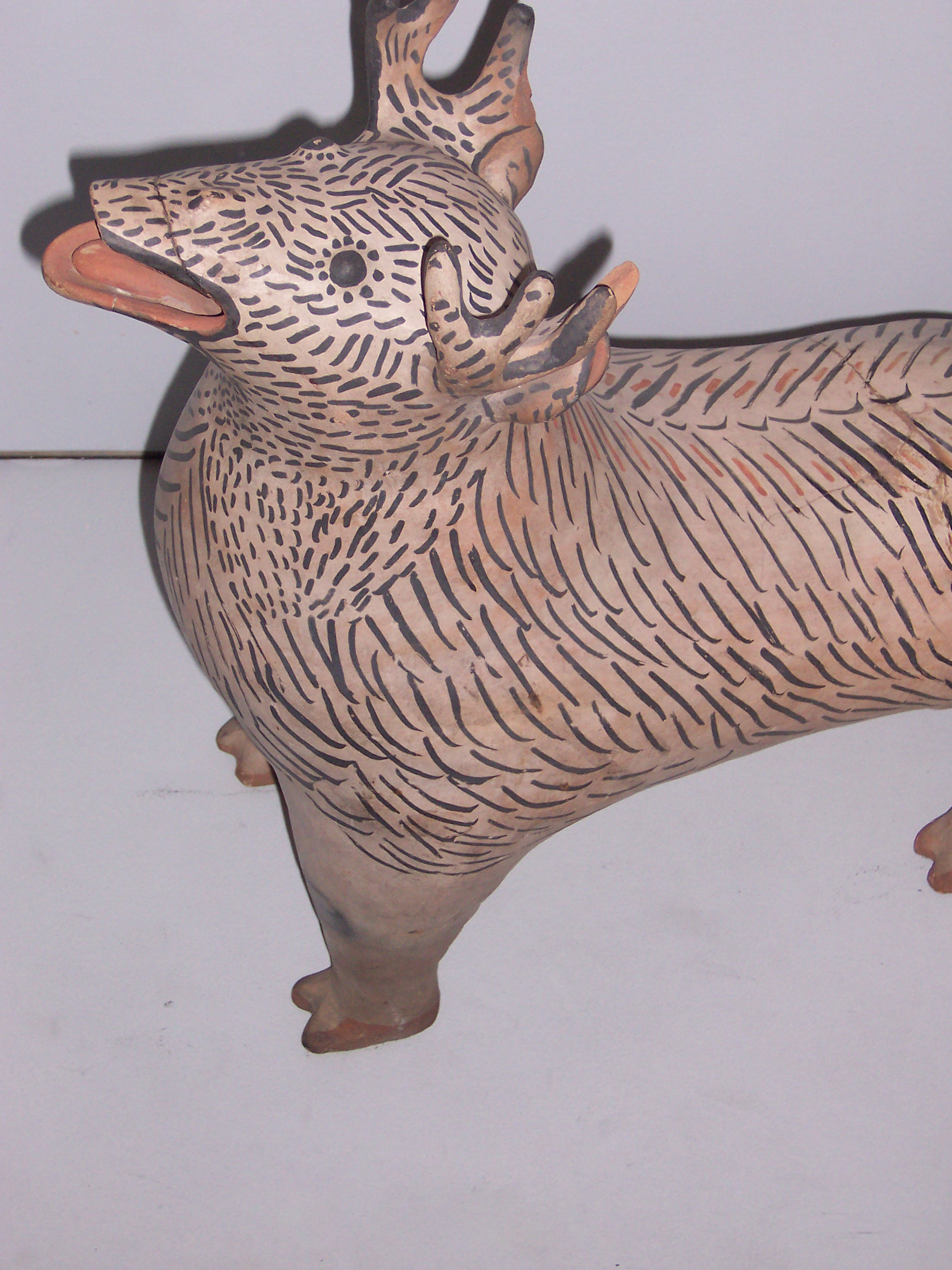
Deer effigy, pottery. Cochiti Pueblo

- Ancestral Pueblo
- Mogollon culture, including Mimbres culture, which produced Mimbres pottery
- Santa Clara Pueblo, Taos Pueblo, Hopi, San Ildefonso Pueblo, Acoma Pueblo and the Zuni. Noted individuals involved in Pueblo pottery include Nampeyo of the Hopi, and Maria and Julian Martinez of San Ildefonso Pueblo. In the early 1900s, Maria Martinez and her husband Julian rediscovered how to make the traditional Black-on Black pottery, for which San Ildefonso Pueblo would soon become widely known.

Pottery style	Time period
Late Basketmaker II Era	50 BCE – 450 CE
Basketmaker III Era	450 CE – 700 CE
Pueblo I Era	700–900
Pueblo II Era	900–1100
Pueblo III Era	1100–1300
Pueblo IV Era	1300–1600
Historic	1600–1880
Modern	1880–1950
Contemporary	1950–present

==== O'odham cultures ====
- Hohokam, Tohono O'odham, Akimel O'odham

==== Athabaskan ====
Southern Athabaskans include the Apache and Navajo.

==== Other ====
- The Salado culture (1150–15th century CE) of Arizona and New Mexico produced Salado Polychrome.
- Casas Grandes

== Mesoamerican pottery ==
Ancient Mesoamerican pottery is one of the most significant and diverse aspects of the region’s cultural and artistic heritage. Its forms, styles, and functions vary widely across time and geographic location, yet the art of pottery production played a crucial role in both daily life and ceremonial practices for the Mesoamerican peoples. The production and use of pottery in the western hemisphere is thought to have originated in central South America, eventually moving northwards. The Olmec culture originated around 1500 BCE, with pottery found in San Lorenzo dating to 1350 BCE. San Lorenzo is thought of as a distribution center of sorts, with many pieces of Olmec-style pottery produced there and distributed throughout Mesoamerica.

Vessels were most commonly constructed using the coil-and-scrape method. Artists would prepare the clay, then roll it into coils or ropes, stacking them on top of one another to form the desired shape. Once the coils were placed, the artist would smooth the surface to create a solid, unified form. Often, another vessel would be used as a mold to shape the pottery into a specific shape. This technique allowed for the creation of many forms, from simple vessels to intricate figurines.

Slip, a liquefied clay mixture, served both practical and decorative purposes. Slip was applied to the surface of pottery to make it more water-resistant, but it was also used to add decorative elements. The slip could be applied in various colors, with contrasting hues creating detailed designs on the surface. These designs often included naturalistic animals, geometric patterns, and symbolic figures, many of which carried religious or cultural significance.

=== Olmec-Style Figurines ===
In Olmec archaeological sites throughout the region, small figurines have been found. Some figurines are seated depictions of people with infantile features. These hollow forms have pigment added to their inscribed details. These artifacts have chubby bodies, puffy eyes, and downturned mouths. However, the features vary greatly. Some have unnaturally elongated heads, while others wear helmets with chin straps. Most are nude and lacking genitalia. Some wear loincloths. They are almost always in a seated position with dynamic poses. Some researchers have proposed that the unusual proportions may point to some nature of worship towards infants or people with disorders. Regardless of the purpose for such statues, the craftsmanship is clearly evident.

As with many other forms of Olmec-style art, the baby-face motif is present throughout its ceramics. The distinctive almond-shaped eyes and upturned mouth are indicative of the Olmec culture. This distinctive style allows archaeologists to track the distribution of both individual items’ and the culture’s influence throughout the region. Over time, Olmec pottery techniques were picked up by neighboring cultures, helping to shape the artistic styles of the Maya, Mixtecs, and other Mesoamerican societies.

=== Teotihuacan Artifacts ===
Vast numbers of terracotta figurines have been found throughout the city of Teotihuacan. These items had a variety of styles and features, with some being hand-built and others cast in a mold. The use of molds shows the widespread significance of the figurines. Although the exact function of these figurines remains a topic of debate, most scholars believe they were used in domestic or private rituals. Fragments of these figurines are often found in residential areas, which suggests they may have played a role in family or individual practices. The figurines vary in appearance, with different poses, clothing, and headdresses that likely had symbolic meaning, possibly tied to familial lineage or social status.

Slab-footed tripod vessels are a signature of the ceramicists of Teotihuacan. These dishes consist of a large pot supported by three legs. The size of these vessels ranges from personal drinking cups to large basins. The range of styles is just as great. The walls can be any combination of concave, straight, unornamented or highly decorative. Some come with lids, although it is unknown if covered vessels were standard. These containers were most likely intended to hold a cacao drink, although there are depictions of slab-footed tripod vessels holding food. These items also show the interregional travel that the Teotihuacans undertook. A multitude of slab-footed tripod vessels are found throughout Mexican archaeological sites. Mayan ceramicists also adapted the style, taking the small, crude supports to substantial, ornamental pillars. The spread of these ceramic items illustrates the interregional connections that existed within Mesoamerica, as well as the role of pottery in facilitating cultural interaction and exchange.

== Circum-Caribbean ==
=== Antilles ===
Ceramics first appeared in the Antilles as part of the Saladoid culture (named for the Saladero site in the Orinoco basin in Venezuela. Saladoid people appeared in Trinidad around 500 BC or a little later, and had reached Puerto Rico by about 250 BC. The Cedrosan variety of Saladoid ceramics appeared in Trinidad early on, although ceramics in the Antilles continued to closely resemble forms on the Venezuela coast into the Current Era. Cedrosan Saladoid vessels have a distinctive bell shape with "zone-incised cross-hatching". Many also have complex designs of white on red paint. Later examples were decorated with purple, black, yellow and orange paint. These ceramics are described as "technologically fine, delicate, and graceful."

Other ceramics styles are also known from the Antilles during this time period. Barrancoid trade wares, of a style that had developed in the Orinoco River valley around 1000 BC, have been found in the southernmost Antilles; Trinidad, Tobago, and Saint Vincent. A variant of Saladoid ceramics called Huecan has been found from the north coast of Venezuela to Puerto Rico.

=== Colombia and Venezuela ===
Fiber-tempered ceramics associated with shell middens left by hunter-fisher-gatherers of the Early Northwest South American Literature appeared at sites such as Puerto Hormiga, Monsú, Puerto Chacho, and San Jacinto in Colombia by 3100 BCE. Fiber-tempered ceramics at Monsú have been dated to 5940 radiocarbon years before present. The fiber-tempered pottery at Puerto Hormiga was "crude", formed from a single lump of clay. The fiber-tempered pottery at San Jacinto is described as "well-made". Sand-tempered coiled ceramics have also been found at Puerto Horrible.

Ráquira, a town in the Boyacá Department, Colombia, is a major ceramics center, where both Indigenous techniques and those introduced by Europeans are employed to create primarily utilitarian pots based on Chibcha designs. Ceramic mobiles, nativity scenes, and animal figurines are popular, especially ceramic horses, which have been the symbol of Colombian pottery.

La Chamba in the Tolima Department is known for its blackware. The women potters here also create brown and red ware.

Barrancoid and Saladoid ceramics flourished at the lower Orinoco River near the modern settlements of Saladero and Barrancas in Venezuela by 1400 BCE, Tocuyanoid in the Venezuelan State of Lara, while the Santa Ana culture was present around the same time in Trujillo.

== Andean region ==
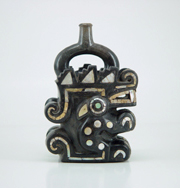
Moche Crawling Feline, a stirrup spout vessel with shell inlay, c. 100–800 CE

In the Andes, great civilizations had been created and flourished for thousands of years during the Andean preceramic period. Yet the ceramics appear only during the Initial Period around 1800 BCE. Their main purpose may have been for boiling agricultural produce.

The earliest ceramics in the Andean area have been radiocarbon dated to about 1800 BC, although according to John H. Rowe the date may go back even to 2100 BC. Early ceramics have been found on the central coast at the large settlement of Las Haldas, at Huarmey, as well as at some other sites in the Casma River region, and in Lima area.

Chavín potters (900–200 BC) on the Peruvian coast created distinctive stirrup spout vessels, both incised and highly burnished. These thin-walled effigy pots were fashioned to resemble stylized humans, plants, and animals. Two substyles of Chavín stirrup spout pots include the thicker-walls, glossy-on-matte blackware Cupisnique style and red and black Santa Ana style, both featuring fanged heads. Subsequent Andean cultures revived these ancient ceramics styles and imagery.

Paracas culture, from Peru's desert south coast, created highly detailed ceramics, that were often painted after firing. Paints, made with an acacia resin binder, were commonly warm yellow, olive green, red-orange, white, and black in color. Paracas artists built upon Chavín styles and introduced the double spout-and-bridge vessel and distinctive masks portraying a supernatural "Oculate Being," that combines human, owl, and double-headed snake forms.

Nasca culture, another south coastal Peruvian culture, returned to the less fragile practice slip-painted their ceramics prior to firing. They created thirteen distinct colors, the larger palette found in Pre-Columbian ceramics in the Americas, which included rare pale purple, maroon, and bluish-grey. Nasca artists created ceremonial and utilitarian bowls and beakers, effigy jars, panpipes, and vessels of new designs, including the stepped-fret. These combined sculptural elements with surface painting, often with curvilinear designs emphasized by bold, black outlining. Painters used revolving turntables to paint all sides of a ceramic piece.

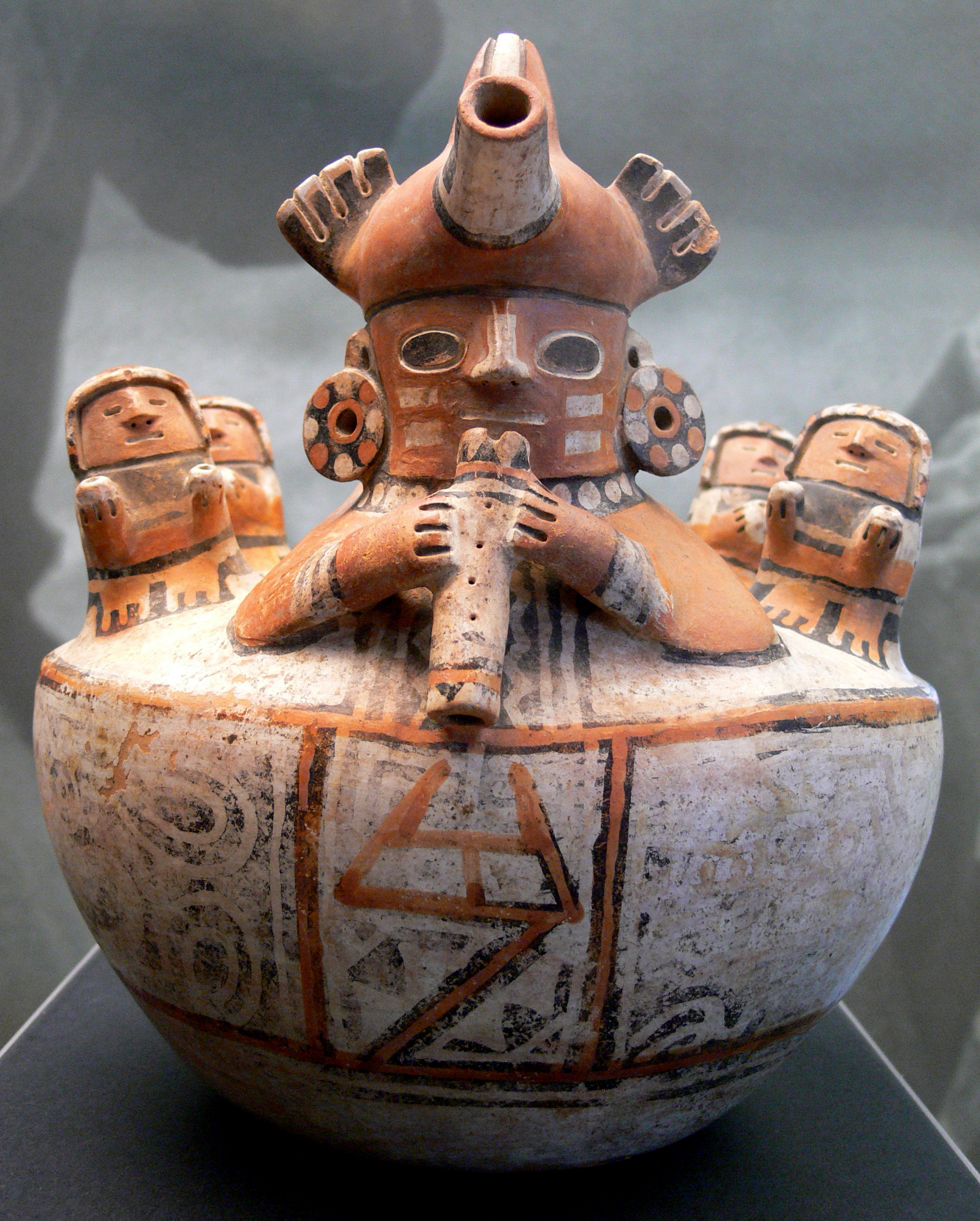
Recuay effigy jar, c. 100 BCE–300 CE, collection of Museum zu Allerheiligen, Switzerland

Dominating Peru's north coast from 1–600 CE, the Moche culture excelled at the art of ceramics, which was characterized by symbolic, religious imagery. Moche artists produced some of the more naturalistic, i.e. faithfully representational, artwork of the precolumbian Americas. Moche portrait vessel were so realistic that individuals portrayed at different stages of their life are identifiable. Their paintings on ceramics were narrative and action-packed. Ceramics produced by two-press molds were identical in shape but individualized through unique surface painting. Tens of thousands of Moche ceramics have survived today. The stirrup-spout vessel continued to be the most common form of clay vessel, but Moche artists also created bowls, dippers, jars with long necks, spout-and-handle vessels, and double-chambered vessels that whistled when liquid was poured. Vessels were often effigies portraying elaborate scenes. A fineline painting tradition emerged, which resembles Greek black-figure pottery. A 29,000-square-foot Moche ceramics workshop with numerous kilns was discovered in at the mountain Mayal in the Chicama Valley. The workshop specialized in female figurines.

The Tiwanaku and Wari cultures shared dominance of the Andes, roughly from 500 to 1000 BCE. The Tiwanaku civilizations originated in Lake Titicaca region of Bolivia, and a staff-bearing deity figured largely in their artwork. Tiwanaku artists continued the tradition of naturalistic, ceramic portrait vessels. The ubiquitous Wari ceramics carried over imagery from their textiles and metalwork, such as llama and alpaca imagery. Qunchupata in Peru was the epicenter of Wari ceramic production, featuring pit kilns and firing rooms. The stone floors of the firing rooms had rounded depressions for accommodating larger pots. Some Wari palaces had their own attached kilns. Broken potsherds were used as forms for building new pots and for scrapers. Evidence shows ceramics were often ritually destroyed.

Four Andean civilizations flourished in Late Intermediate Period: the Chancay, Chimú, Lambayeque, and Ica. Luxury goods, including elaborate ceramics, were mass-produced in vast quantities for the middle class as well as nobles. Identical ceramics created in molds took sway over individualized works. The Lambayeque culture of north coastal Peru created press-molded reliefs on blackware ceramics. Chimú ceramics, also predominantly blackware, often featured zoomorphic appliqués, such as monkeys or sea birds. They excelled at the doubled-chambered whistling vessels. Chancay ceramics, from the central coast, featured black-on-white designs on unique shapes, such as female effigies or elongated, oval jars. Their sand-tempered ceramics were hastily painted and left unpolished. Ica culture ceramics, from the southern coasts, were the finest quality of their time. They were still handcrafted and had a wide range of polychrome slips, including black, maroon, orange, purple, red, white, and a glittery deep purple. Designs were abstract and geometric.

The Inca Empire or Tawantinsuyo spanned 3500 miles and controlled the world's largest empire by 1500 CE. Artistically, they unified regional styles. Incan ceramics were geometric and understated, while color schemes remained regionally diverse. Mass-produced pottery, conformed to standardized measurements, such as the urpu, a long-necked jar with handles and a pointed bottom used to transport maize and chicha, maize beer. Qirus were Incan drinking vessels, made from wood or precious metals, as well as ceramics.

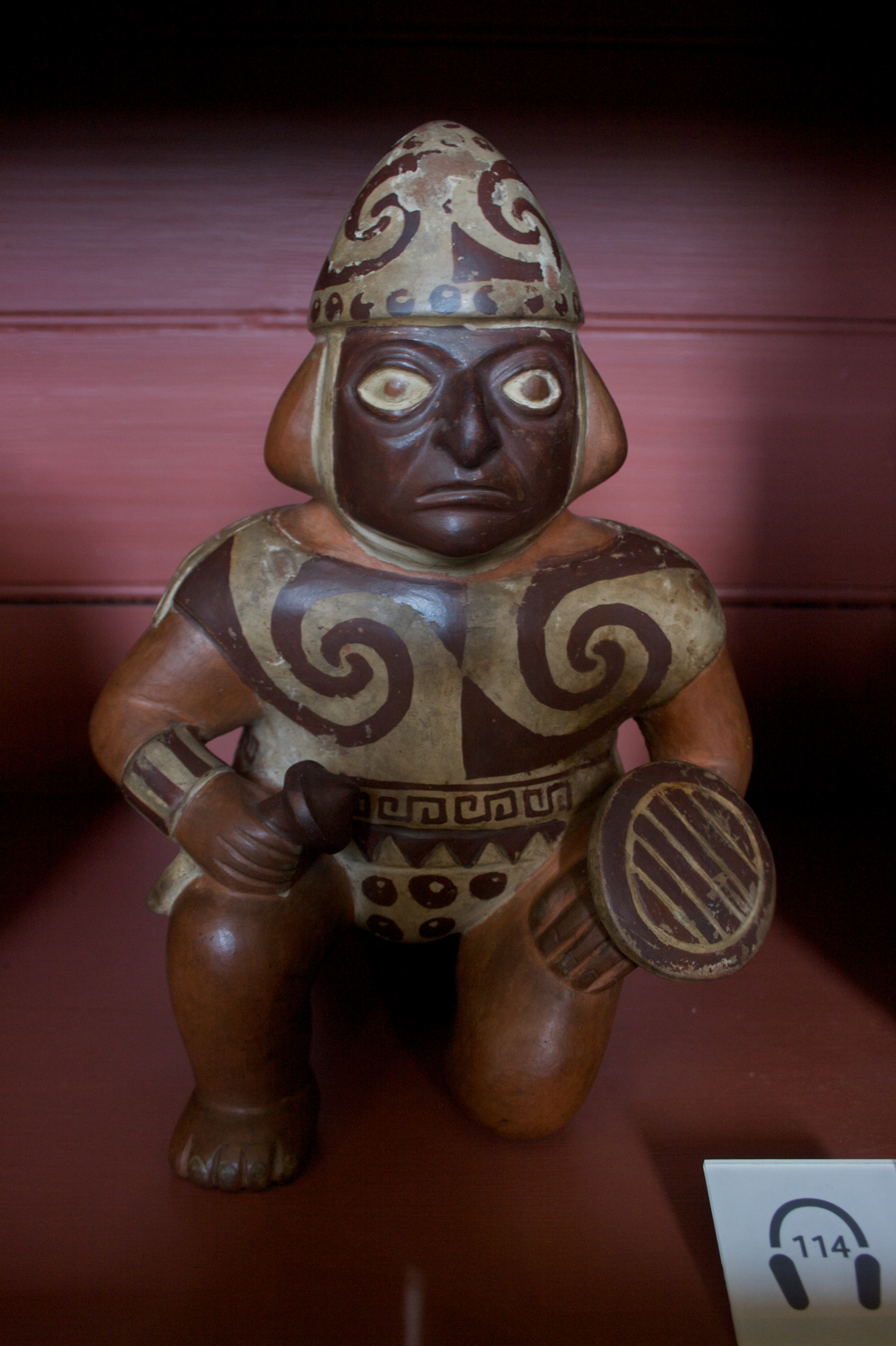
Moche warrior pot, c. 100–700 CE, British Museum

Andean cultural horizons	Time period	Cultures/sites
Lithic	10,000–3,000 BCE	Guitarrero Cave
Cotton Pre-Ceramic	3000–1800 BCE	Norte Chico civilization, Huaca Prieta, Las Haldas
Initial Period	1800–800 BCE	Chinchorro, Las Haldas
Early Horizon	800–200 BCE	Cupisnique, Paracas, Chavín, Pukará
Early Intermediate Period	200 BCE–500 CE	Moche, Nasca, Recuay, Huarpa, Tiwanaku
Middle Horizon	500–900 CE	Moche, Lambayeque, Ica, Wari, Tiwanaku
Late Intermediate Period	900–1400 CE	Chancay, Chimú, Lambayeque, Ica, Inca
Late Horizon	1400–1534	Inca
Historical	1534–1950	Viceroyalty of Peru, Indigenous peoples of the Andes
Contemporary	1950–present	Indigenous peoples of the Andes

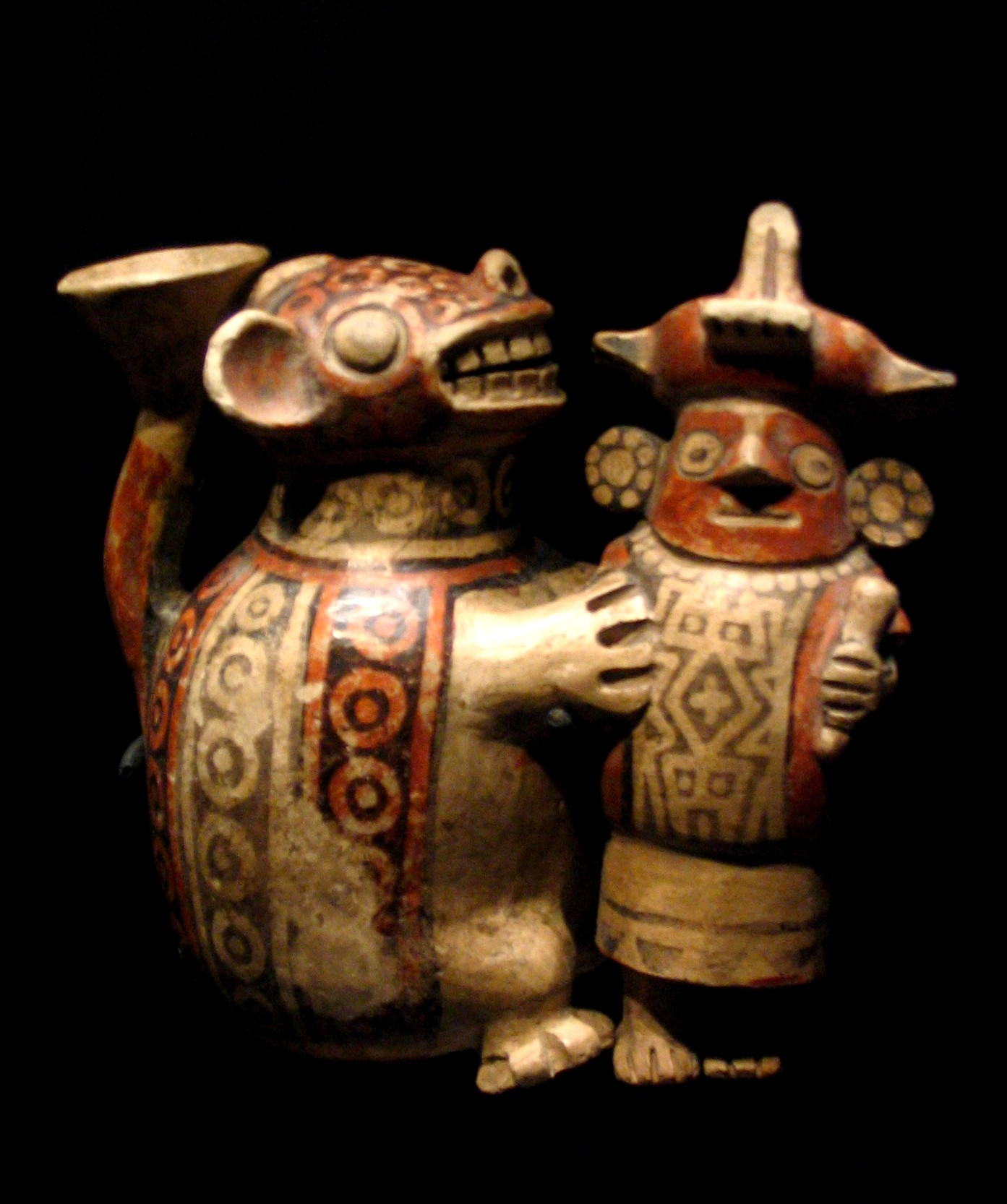
Recuay effigy of a feline attacking a warrior, Musée du Quai Branly, Paris

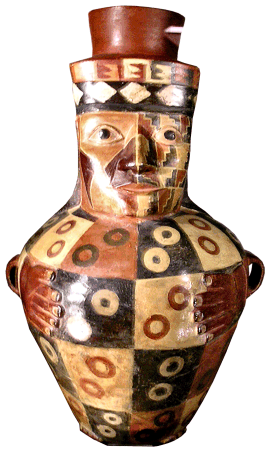
Anthropomorphic Wari polychrome pottery

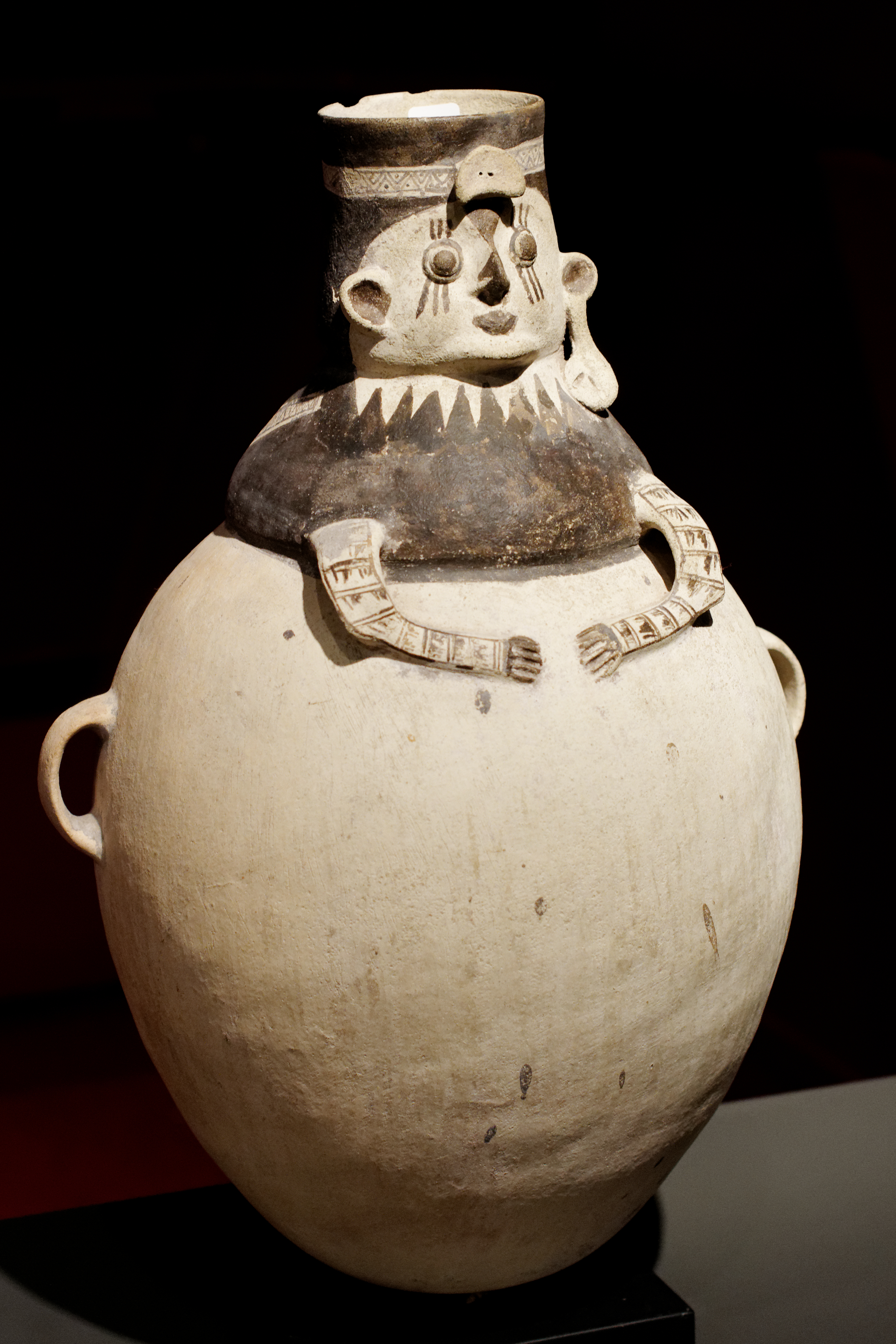
Chancay female effigy bottle, ca. 1100–1400

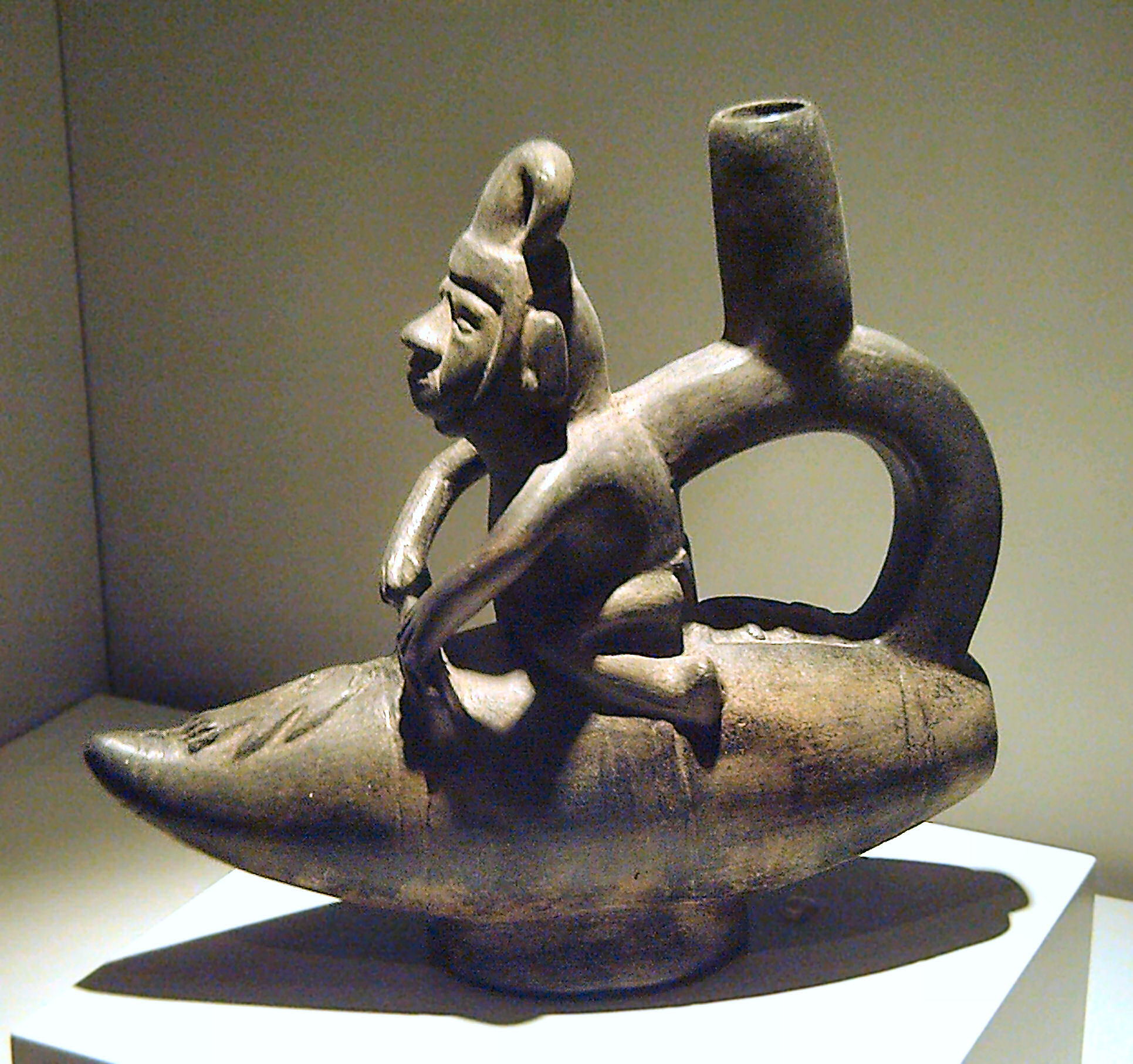
Chimú stirrup spout vessel representing a fisherman on a caballito de totora, 1100–1400 CE

== Gran Chaco ==
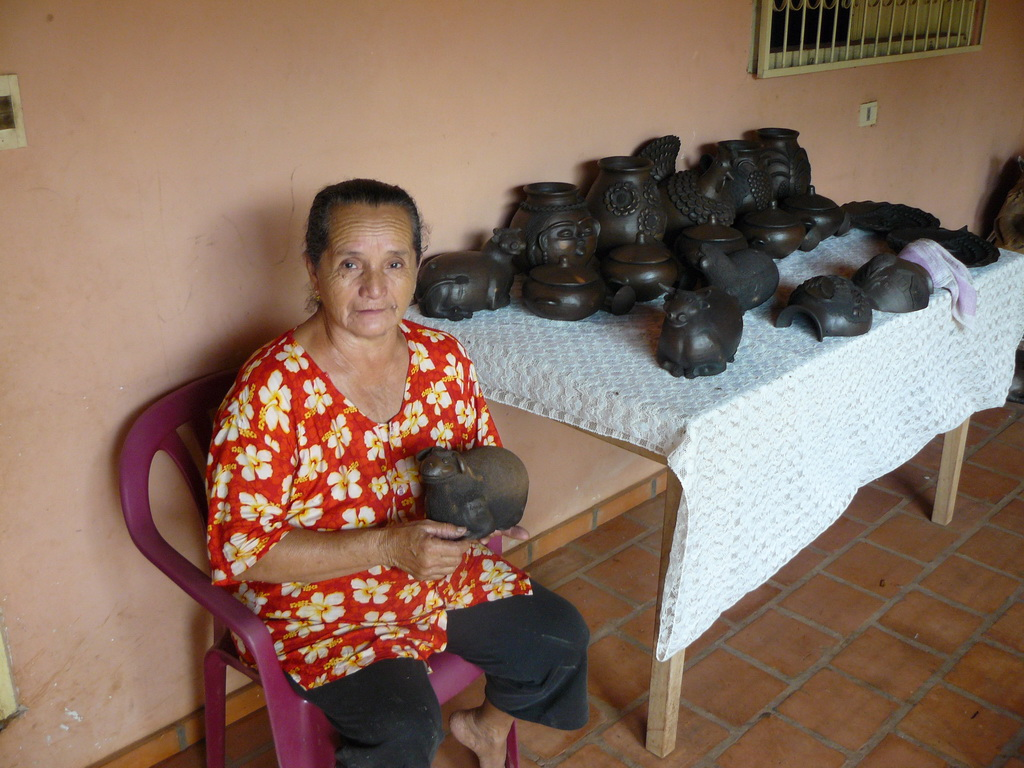
Doña Rosa Brítez with her blackware pottery

Guaraní ceramics fall into two major categories: na'e, or dishes, and yapepó, pots, pans, and storage containers. These were both utilitarian and ceremonial. The precontact ceramic tradition of the Gran Chaco was dramatically transformed under European colonization, which created a demand for pitchers, cups, and other introduced pottery forms. Author Josefina Pla observed that women are typically potters, and animals associated with men are not represented in Guaraní pottery.

Tobatí, a city near Asunción, Paraguay, is renowned for its ceramics, including tiles and female effigy jars, known as Las gorgas. A reddish-brown slip, known as tapyta in Guaraní, is popular, with blackware being less common. A local ceramic artist, Don Zenón Páez (b. 1927) became famous for his ceramic figures of saints.

Itá, Paraguay is another ceramic center, known for its whimsical, ceramic chickens. Rosa Brítez (b. 1941) is a famous ceramic artist from Itá and has been recognized by UNESCO.

The Museo del Barro, "Museum of Clay," in Asunción features pottery from the Gran Chaco, from Pre-Columbian Guaraní to contemporary mestizo ceramics.

== Amazonia ==
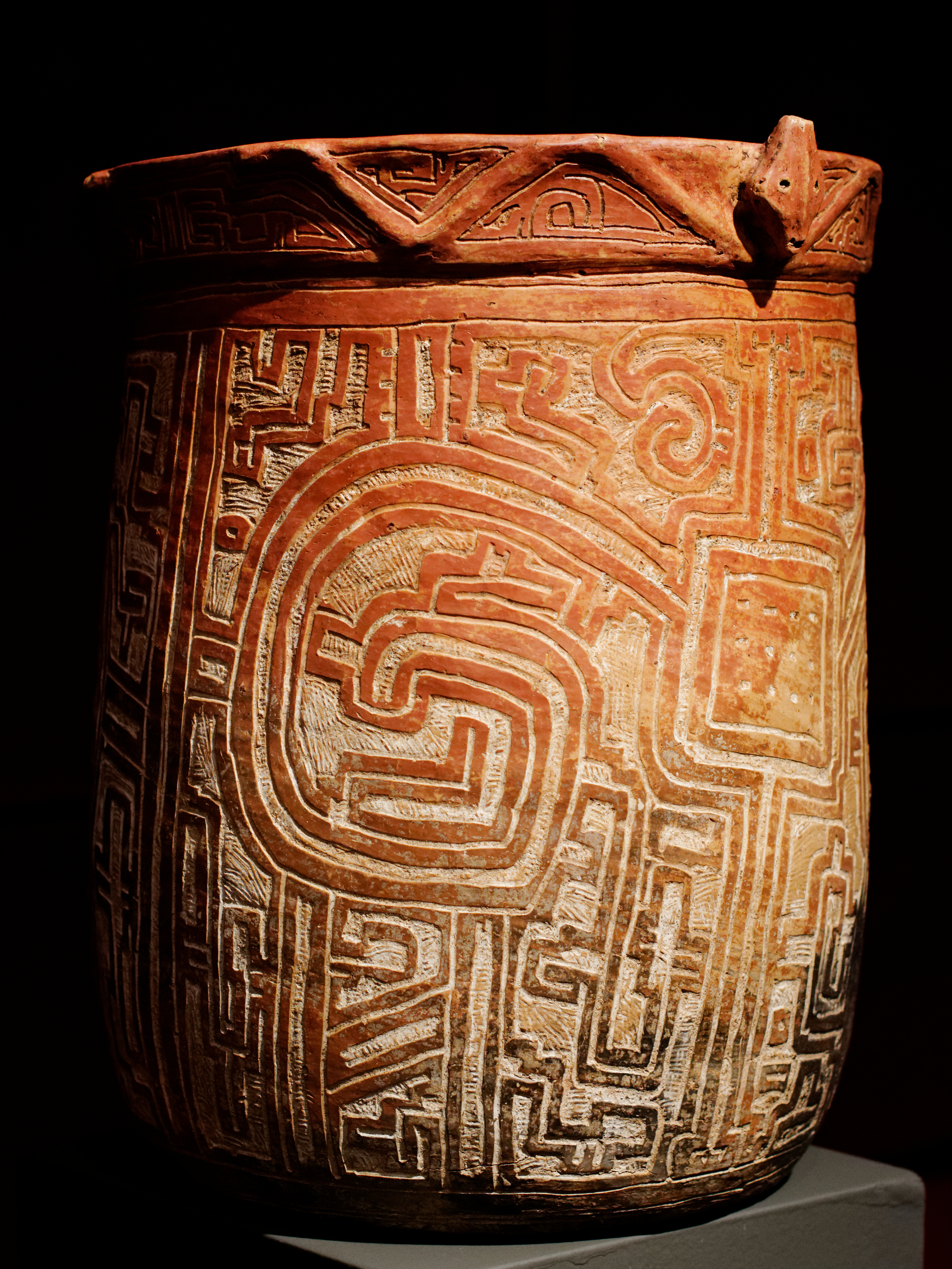
Cylindrical vessel. Marajo island, Brazil, Joanes style, Marajoara phase, 400–1000 CE

The pottery tradition at Pedra Pintada in Brazil represents the oldest known ceramics in the Americas. Dating back to 5630 BCE, this same tradition continued for 2500 years. Ceramics from the Taperinha site near Santarém, Brazil date back to 5130 BCE and include sand-tempered bowls and cooking vessels resembling gourds. Other ancient Amazonian ceramic traditions, Mina and Uruá-Tucumã featured shell- and sand-tempered pottery, that was occasionally painted red. Around 1000 CE, dramatic new ceramic styles emerged throughout Amazonia. Amazonian ceramics are geometric and linear in decoration. Polychrome pottery typically features red and black on white slips. Additionally ceramics were decorated by sculpting, incision, excision, and grooving. In the upper and central Amazon, the bark of the caraipé tree, Licania octandra, provided tempering material.

In regions of terra preta, or "black earth", of the Amazon rainforest, an abundance of potsherds were used to develop the soil and build mounds, which protected buildings and cemeteries from seasonal flooding.

Marajó Island, located at the mouth of the Amazon River was a major ceramic center, where the Marajoara Phase of polychrome ceramics last from around 400 to 1300 CE. In the central Amazon, the Mancapuru Phase, or Incised Rim Tradition, emerged in the 5th century CE. Marajoara ceramics, typically tempered with grog, were complex effigies of humans and animals, such as reptiles and birds. The dead were cremated and buried in elaborate ceramic urns. Ceramic artists are active in Marajó, using precontact styles for inspiration.

Women have traditionally been the ceramic artists in the Amazon. Female figures are common in anthropomorphic effigy vessels. Tangas are a unique Amazonian cultural item; they are triangular, concave ceramic pubic coverings held in place by strings, once worn by women of several Amazonian tribes. Today, they are still worn by girls during their puberty rites among Panoan-speaking peoples.

== Ceramics forms ==
- Double spout and bridge vessel
- Olla
- Stirrup spout vessel
- Stirrup jar

== See also ==
- List of Indigenous ceramics artists in the Americas
- List of Native American ceramics artists in the United States
- Visual arts by Indigenous peoples of the Americas
- Huaco (pottery)
- Mata Ortiz pottery
- Mexican ceramics
- Mimbres pottery
- Pit fired pottery
- Painting in the Americas before Colonization
- Pottery of the American Southwest
- Indigenous peoples of the Americas
- Black-on-black ware
- Pueblo pottery

== Bibliography ==
- Allaire, Louis (1997). "The Lesser Antilles before Columbus". In Samuel M. Wilson (ed.). The Indigenous People of the Caribbean. Gainesville, Florida: University Press of Florida. pp. 20–28. ISBN 0-8130-1531-6.
- Clark, John E.; Gosser, Dennis (1995). "Reinventing Mesoamerica's First Pottery" (PDF). In William K. Barnett; John W. Hoopes (eds.). The Emergence of Pottery: technology and innovation in ancient societies. Washington: Smithsonian Institution Press. pp. 209–219. ISBN 978-1-56098-516-7.
- Cooper, Emmanuel (2000). Ten Thousand Years of Pottery. Philadelphia: University of Pennsylvania Press. ISBN 978-0-8122-3554-8.
- Josephy, Alvin M., Jr. The Indian Heritage of America. Boston: Mariner Books, 2001. ISBN 978-0-395-57320-4.
- Davies, Lucy; Fini, Mo (1995). Arts & crafts of South America. San Francisco: Chronicle Books. ISBN 0-8118-0837-8.
- Milanich, Jerald T. (1994). Archaeology of Precolumbian Florida. Gainesville: University Press of Florida. ISBN 0-8130-1273-2.
- Righter, Elizabeth (1997). "The Ceramics, Art, and Material Culture of the Early Ceramic Period in the Caribbean Islands". In Samuel M. Wilson (ed.). The Indigenous People of the Caribbean. Gainesville, Florida: University Press of Florida. pp. 70–79. ISBN 0-8130-1531-6.
- Roosevelt, Anna C. (1996). "The Maritime, Highland, Forest Dynamic and the Origins of Complex Culture". In Frank Salomon; Stuart B. Schwartz (eds.). The Cambridge History of the Native Peoples of the Americas. Cambridge, England New York: Cambridge University Press. pp. 264–349. ISBN 978-0-521-63075-7.
- Saunders, Rebecca (2002). "The Fig Island Ring Complex (38CH42): Coastal Adaptation and the Question of Ring Function in the Late Archaic" (PDF). National Park Service. Archived (PDF) from the original on 14 July 2010.
- Silverman, Helaine; Isbell, William (2008). Handbook of South American archaeology. New York: Springer. ISBN 978-0-387-75228-0.
- Stone-Miller, Rebecca (2002). Art of the Andes: from Chavín to Inca. London: Thames & Hudson. ISBN 978-0-500-20363-7.
- Walthall, John A. (1980). Prehistoric Indians of the Southeast: Archaeology of Alabama and the Middle South. Tuscaloosa, Alabama: University of Alabama Press. ISBN 978-0-8173-0552-9.
- Watters, David R. (1997). "Maritime Trade in the Prehistoric Eastern Caribbean". In Samuel M. Wilson (ed.). The Indigenous People of the Caribbean. Gainesville: University Press of Florida. pp. 88–99. ISBN 0-8130-1531-6.
- Weinstein, Richard A.; Dumas, Ashley A. (2008). "The Spread of Shell-Tempered Ceramics along the Northern Coast of the Gulf of Mexico" (PDF). Southeastern Archaeology. 27 (2). Maney Publishing: 202–221. Archived from the original (PDF) on 25 April 2012.
- Wilson, Samuel M. (1997). "Introduction to the Study of the Indigenous People of the Caribbean". In Samuel M. Wilson (ed.). The Indigenous People of the Caribbean. Gainesville, Florida: University Press of Florida. pp. 1–8. ISBN 0-8130-1531-6.
- Hosterman, John W. (1984). "Ball Clays and Bentonite Deposits of the Coastal and Western Gulf of Mexico Coastal Plain, United States". Washington, D.C.: USGS Bulletin 1558-C.
- Calver, James L. (1949). "Florida Kaolins and Clays". Florida D.E.P., FLGS.
