= Juana Marta Rodas =

- Born: February 8, 1925; Itá, Central Department, Paraguay
- Died: August 8, 2013 (aged 88)
- Citizenship: Paraguayan
- Known for: Ceramics
- Notable work: Exhibitions with Julia Isídrez; featured in Museo del Barro and UNESCO Gallery
- Movement: Modern art
- Awards: Prince Claus Award (1999), Grand Cross of the National Order of Merit (France, 2009), UNESCO Best Craft Artist (1999)

Juana Marta Rodas (February 8, 1925 – August 8, 2013) was a Paraguayan ceramist.

== Biography ==
Rodas was born on February 8, 1925, in Itá in the Central Department, a city that is nicknamed the Capital of Ceramics. She died on August 8, 2013.

She was educated in ceramic art by her mother Juana de Jesús Oviedo and grandmother María Balbina Cuevas. Herself, she passed her knowledge to her daughter with whom she worked together great part of her career and who became a known ceramist herself too, Julia Isídrez. Together they held exhibitions internationally and received many international awards.

Rodas' work should be classified as modern art, and is characterized by traditional pottery of the countryside with exotic Jesuit and contemporary techniques. Josefina Pla characterized her work as "micro-sculptures" in her book La cerámica popular Paraguaya.

Art critic and academic Ticio Escobar comprises their art as follows: "one of the most strong and original testimonies of contemporary Paraguayan art, and a tribute to its noble history". Her work can be found in private collections, cultural centers and museums in Paraguay and abroad.

== Expositions ==
The art of Rodas and Isídrez was shown on many expositions in Paraguay and abroad. Here follows a selection:

- 1976. Gallery van the UNESCO, Paris
- 1992 and 1993: Gallery Fábrica, Asunción
- 1994: Salon of the Biennale Martel, Cultural City Center, Asunción
- 1995: Gallery Lamarca, Asunción
- 1995: Center of Visual Arts, Museo del Barro, Asunción
- 1996: Gallery Fábrica, Asunción
- 1997: Gallery Lamarca, Asunción
- 1998 and 1999: Center of Visual Arts, Museo del Barro, Asunción
- 1999: Biennale of the Mercosur, Porto Alegre
- 2007: 16th international year fair ARte COntemporáneo (ARCO), Madrid
- 2008: 35th international exhibition of traditional art, Pontifical Catholic University of Chile, Santiago
- 2009: Museum of Contemporary Crafts Art of Chile, Santiago

== Awards ==
Rodas received many awards, greatly together with her daughter Julia Isídrez:

- 1994: Grand Prize, Biennale of Martel for Visual Arts, Cultural City Center, Asunción
- 1998: Prize of the city of Madrid
- 1999: Prince Claus Award
- 1999: Award for Best Craft Artist of the UNESCO, the Central Department and the society Hecho à Mano
- 2001: First Prize in Traditional Art, Cooperativa Universitaria
- 2008: Lorenzo Berg Salvo Prize, Pontifical Catholic University of Chile, Santiago
- 2009: Grand Cross of the National Order of Merit, France
