= Itá, Paraguay =

Itá Ita
- District & City
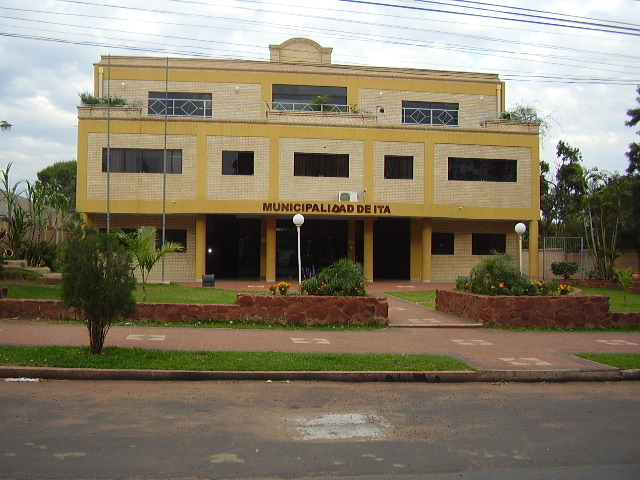

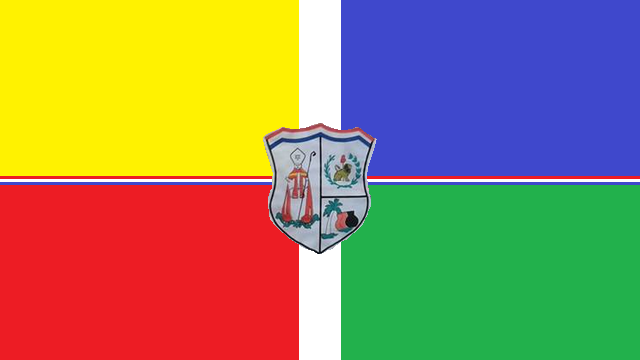
- Flag

- Location within Paraguay
- Coordinates: 25°29′0″S 57°21′0″W
- Country: Paraguay
- Department: Central
- Founded: 1539

Government
  - Intendente Municipal: Gloria Vicenta Benitez de Cantero

Area
  - Total: 183.84 km^{2} (70.98 sq mi)
- Elevation: 101 m (331 ft)

Population (2016)
  - Total: 75,606
  - Density: 265/km^{2} (690/sq mi)
- Time zone: -4 Gmt
- Postal code: 2710
- Area code: (595) (24)
- Climate: Cfa

Itá (Guarani: Ita) is a city and a district located along the 35th kilometer of National Route 1 in the Central Department of Paraguay.

== Etymology ==
The city’s name means "stone" in the Guaraní language. It is also known as the "Capital of Ceramics". According to other derives from the landscape that is love of the hills in the background that every ston

=== Weather ===
The maximum temperature in summer reaches 40°C at times. The minimum in winter is 0°C. The average in the central department is 22°C. It is located in one of the departments in which rainfall is very abundant from January to April and scarce from June to August.

=== Demography ===
Itá has a total of 81,084 inhabitants, of whom 40,708 were males and 40,377 females, according to projections from the Directorate General of Statistics, Census and Surveys.

== History ==
Itá was founded in 1539 by Domingo Martínez de Irala, the Captain General of the Río de La Plata Governorate. The site of the town has been inhabited by native Guaraní. It has been a district since 1884. Itá begins with a mestizo population with customs and traditions, turning with the passage of time very original, which were gradually lost, not to be disseminated or lack of knowledge, why are not valued or transmitted to its fair measure.

Itá is known and regarded as the city's "pitcher and honey" because in times of reducing the Franciscan Friar Thomas Aquinas was dedicated to teaching women instead of a new way of livelihood which was preparing of the vessels that gave the name of pitcher made of mud.

The production of honey cane dates from the first settlers.

== History of the Itá Lagoon ==
According to some residents of the city of Itá, which in wartime large armies that passed through that place an elderly woman who lived in the interior of his house had a well, the soldiers called thirsty to drink water and the old woman refused to give not only them but everyone who asked to drink and then fell into a flood, which flooded the entire house until they formed a lagoon. There is another story relates that within that gap is a bell buried gold, so that the invaders of wartime not carry as a trophy of war.

== Communities ==
Name	Population
Yjhovy	1435
Potrero Po’i	2046
Itá Potrero	1063
Valle Jo’a	245
Oculto Chircaty	780
Arrua’i	2833
Curupicayty	1468
Peguaho	1289
Jhugua Ñaró	1185
Calle Ybaté	1185
Calle Po’i	193
Tapé Tuyá	497
Posta Gaona	1591
Aveiro	2033
Caaguazu'i	2204
Caraguataity	286
Las Piedras	2507

== Itá neighborhoods ==
Name
Neighborhood San Blas
Neighborhood Sportivo
Neighborhood Cerro Corá
Neighborhood San Antonio
Neighborhood Villa Rossana I and II
Neighborhood Paranambu
Neighborhood San Cayetano
Neighborhood San Miguel

== Economy ==
Residents of Itá are active in the industries of agriculture and pottery, as well as, in recent times, tourism (in the company Arruaí), in addition to the very peculiar characteristics of the use of black pottery.

== Transportation ==
Itá is 37 kilometers from Asunción, located on National Route 1, another route is widely used to reach what is colloquially known as the "Southern Access".

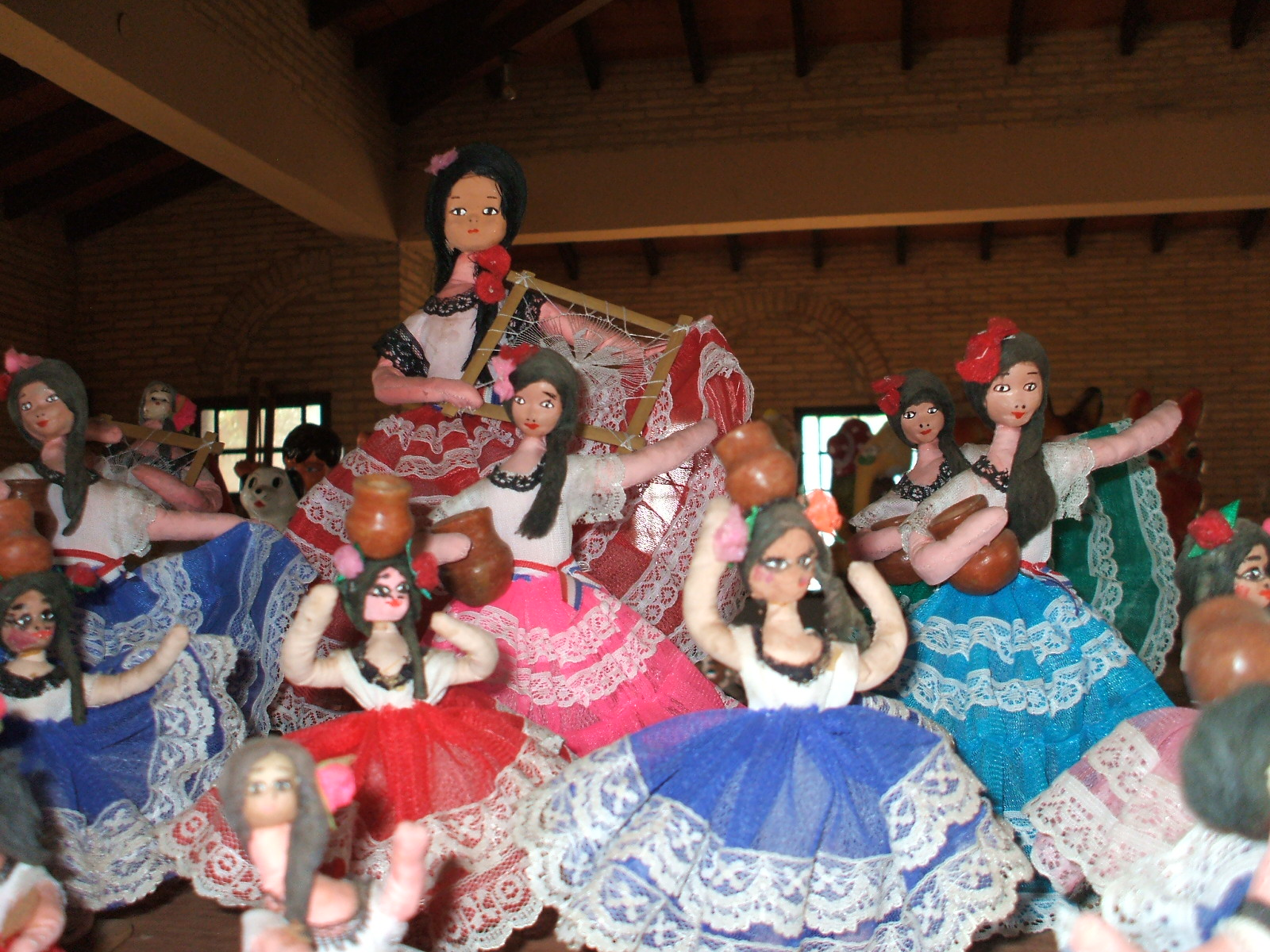
Dancers

== Tourism ==
The city is one of the most significant Franciscan reductions in Paraguay. The people of Itá preserve this tradition through the production of handicrafts in manufacture of ceramics, dolls, and baskets. Visitors can tour the market, tourism gastronomic seafood meal on the market only in the country for its flavor and characteristics.

In the San Blas Craft Center, located on National Route 1 in the city centre, is a permanent exhibition of pottery, Guaraní-Hispanic ceramics, pitchers, blankets and other work.

The Itá lagoon, "Acosta Ñú Martyrs", has never dried.

In the Cerro Arrúa'i cave, there is a resort on the Arroyo Paranambú.

In addition, the Church of San Blas is a Franciscan church built in 1698. There are opportunities for adventure tourism such as hunting, fishing, safaris, and the path of Mariscal Lopez.

== Notable people ==
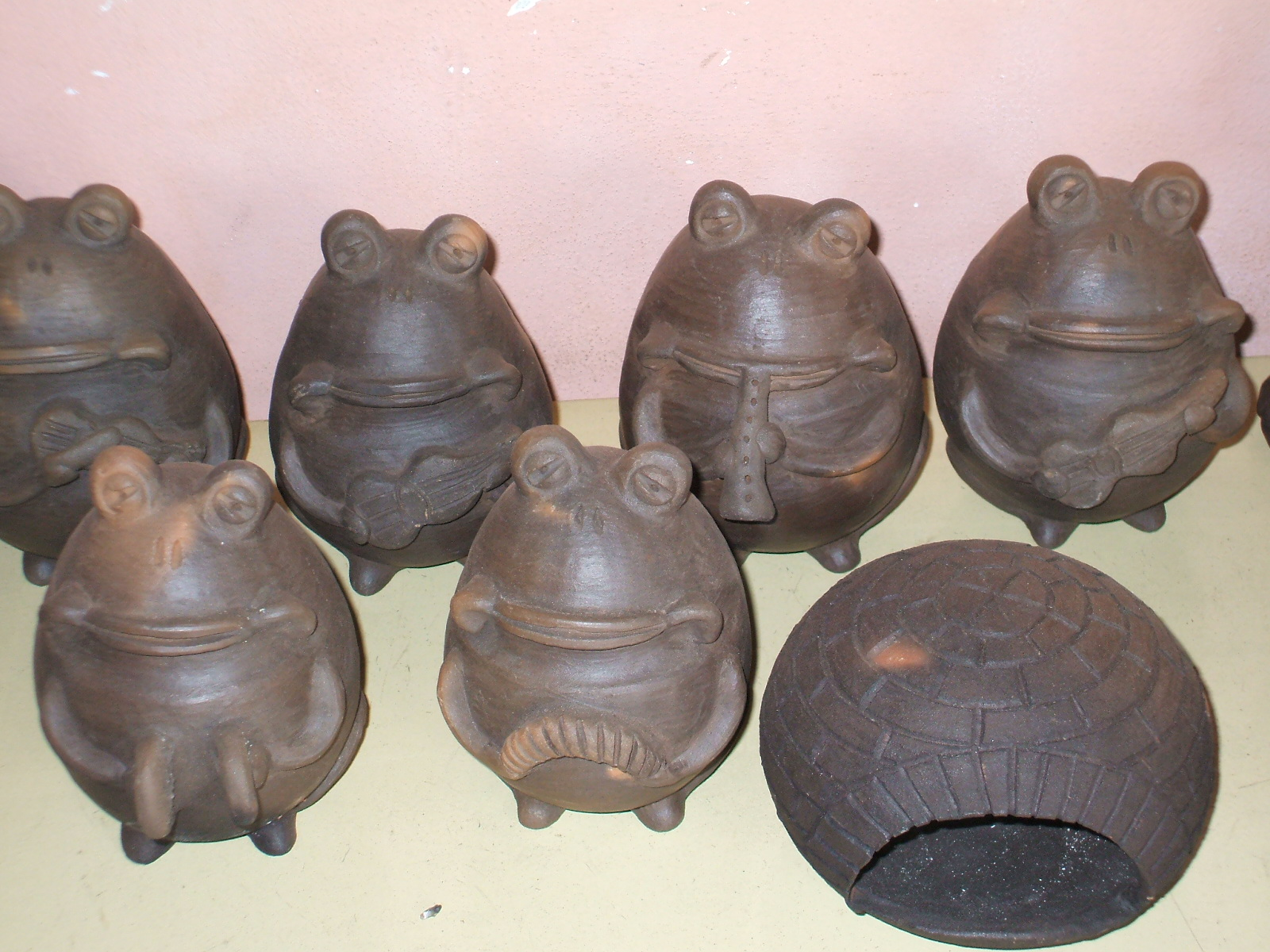
Ceramic works of Rosa Brítez

- Potter, Rosa Brítez, declared "Potter of América" for her work.
- Ceramists Juana Marta Rodas and Julia Isídrez, creditor Dutch "Prince Claus Award" for their work.
- Elvis Marecos, professional footballer.
- Marcelo Fernández, professional footballer.
- Jorge Guasch, professional footballer.
