= Rosa Brítez =

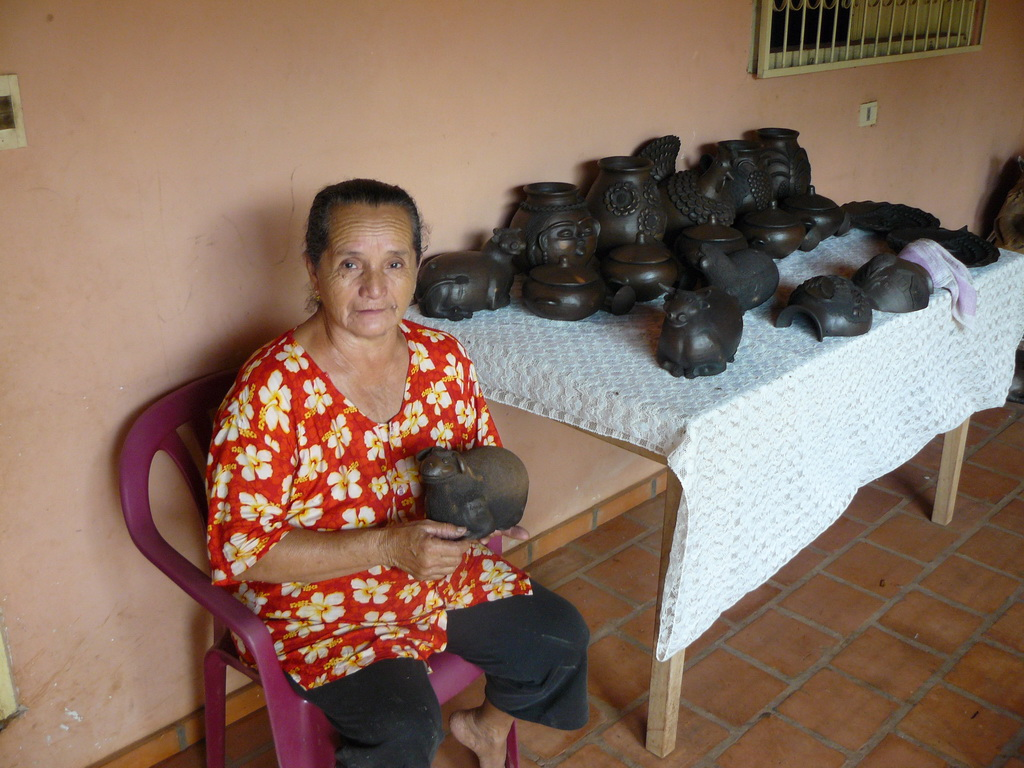
Rosa Brítez with examples of her work in 2008.

Rosa Brítez (April 9, 1941 – December 20, 2017) was a Paraguayan potter and ceramist. One of Paraguay's best known potters, Brítez developed a unique style of pottery by using black clay to craft pieces and ceramic figurines. Her work has been recognized in Paraguay and other countries, including the United States. She became known as the "La Ceremista de América," which translates as "Potter or Ceramists of the Americas."

Rosa Brítez was born in 1941 in Itá in Central Department. She remained in Itá throughout her career. Her home and studio were located along Route 1.

Brítez held exhibitions worldwide, including Spain, the United States, France, Mexico and Chile. She received "Potter of the Americas" award in the United States in 1989. In 2014, the Chamber of Deputies of Paraguay honored Brítez with the National Order for Merit "Comuneros" for her lifetime of work.

Rosa Brítez died on December 20, 2017, from complications of lung disease at Hospital Nacional de Itauguá in Itauguá, Paraguay, at the age of 76. She had been hospitalized in intensive care for the previous 52 days. Brítez was survived by thirteen children and twenty-six grandchildren.
