= Dević =

Dević (Serbian Cyrillic: Девић) is a common Bosnian, Croatian and Serbian surname. It may refer to:

- Borislav Dević (b. 1963), Serbian athlete
- Goran Dević (b. 1971), Croatian film director
- Igor Dević (b. 1984), Croatian footballer
- Marko Dević (b. 1983), Serbian-Ukrainian footballer
- Milan Dević (b. 1974), Serbian footballer
- Vukašin Dević (b. 1984), Serbian footballer

== See also ==
- Devič, a Serb Orthodox abbey in Kosovo
- Devic (disambiguation)
