= Deva =

Deva may refer to:

== Arts and entertainment ==
=== Fictional characters ===
- Deva, an Advanced Dungeons & Dragons 2nd edition monster
- Deva, in the 2023 Indian film Salaar
- Devas, in anime TV series Digimon Tamers

=== Film ===
- Deva (1989 film), a Kannada romantic action film
- Deva (1995 film), a Tamil romantic action film
- Deva (2002 film), a Bengali action masala film
- Deva (2007 film), or Vel
- Deva (2017 film), a Marathi romantic drama
- Deva (2025 film), a Hindi action thriller
- "Deva", a song from the 2024 Indian film Vyuham

== Businesses and organisations ==
- Deutsche Versuchs- und Prüfanstalt für Jagd- und Sportwaffen (DEVA), German Experimental and Test Institute for Hunting and Sporting Firearms
- Democracy and Progress Party (Demokrasi ve Atılım Partisi, DEVA), a Turkish political party
- Democratic Alternative (Finland) (Demokraattinen Vaihtoehto, DeVa), a Finnish political party

== People ==
- Deva (name), including a list of people with the given name and surname
- Deva (composer) (1950–2026), Indian film composer and singer
- Deva (footballer) (Santos Souza Delvanita, born 1989), Brazilian footballer
- Дeva (born 2000), Hungarian singer-songwriter

== Places ==
- Deva, Gijón, Asturias, Spain
- Deva, Romania
- Deva Victrix, a Roman fortress and town, now Chester, England
- Deva Village, Uttar Pradesh, India

== Religion and mythology ==
- Deva (Hinduism), a divine being or god
- Deva (Buddhism), a higher being
- Deva (Jainism), a term used for heavenly beings
- Deva (theosophy), spiritual forces or beings behind nature
- Daeva, a malevolent god or supernatural entity in Zoroastrianism
- Deva people of Sri Lankan mythology

== Rivers ==
- Deva (river), a river in Northern Spain, between Asturias and Cantabria
- River Dee, Aberdeenshire, Scotland, ancient name Deva
- River Dee, Wales, ancient name Deva

== Other uses ==
- Deva (moth), a synonym of Plusiodonta
- Deva dynasty, c. 12th–13th century Hindu dynasty of Bengal
- Deva dynasty (Saketa), 2nd–1st century BCE kings of Ayodhya, Kosala, in India
- Deva Stadium, in Chester, England
- CA Deva, football club in Cantabria, Spain
- Devanagari script, ISO 15924 code Deva

== See also ==
- Deba (disambiguation)
- Dev (disambiguation)
- Deve (disambiguation)
- Devas (disambiguation)
- Devic (disambiguation)
- Dewa (disambiguation)
- Devi (disambiguation)
- Dewi (disambiguation)
- Diva (disambiguation)
- Devta (disambiguation)
- Devatha (disambiguation)
- Devan (disambiguation)
