= Dev 2 =

Dev 2 may refer to:

- Dev 2 (TV series), the second season of Dev
- Dev2.0, also Devo 2.0, a Disney quintet that sings and dances to Devo songs re-recorded by members of the original band
- F9R Dev2, Falcon 9 Reusable Development Vehicle version 2, also codenamed Grasshopper
- Dev-2, a concept car model from Daewoo
- Android Dev Phone 2

== See also ==
- Dev (disambiguation)
