= Deva (name) =

Deva is the name of:

== Given name ==
- Deva (composer) (born 1950), Indian film composer and singer
- Дeva (born 2000), Hungarian singer-songwriter
- Phraya Songsuradet (born Deva Bandhumasena, 1891–1944), Thai military officer
- Deva Dassy, stage name of Marie-Anne Lambert, 1911–2016), French singer
- Deva Katta, Indian-born American citizen filmmaker
- Deva Mahal, soul and R&B singer in New York
- Deva Mahenra (born 1990), actor, model and presenter from Indonesia
- Deva Premal (born 1970), German musician
- Deva Raya II (died 1446), emperor of the Vijayanagara Empire
- Deva (footballer) (Santos Souza Delvanita, born 1989), Brazilian footballer

== Surname ==
- A. N. Prabhu Deva, Indian academic
- Bhattakalanka Deva (fl. 1604), Kannada grammarian
- Mukul Deva (born 1961), Indian English author
- Narendra Deva (1889–1956), Indian politician
- Nirj Deva (born 1948), British politician
- Prabhu Deva (born 1973), South Indian actor, dancer, and movie director
- Ramachandra Deva (1948–2013), Indian Kannada poet, writer and playwright
- Ramachandra Deva I (1568–1607), founder of the Bhoi dynasty of Khurda in Odisha, India
- Saipriya Deva (born 1994), Indian actress
- Sarah Jezebel Deva (Sarah Jane Ferridge, born 1977), English heavy metal singer
- Srikanth Deva (born 1977), Indian music director
- Terra Deva (born 1976), American musician
- Vishnu Deva (born 1975), Indian choreographer
- Xhafer Deva (1904–1978), Albanian politician
