= Debay =

Debay is a surname. Notable people with the surname include:

- Auguste-Hyacinthe Debay (1804–1865), French painter and sculptor
- Lucie Debay (fl. 2009), Belgian-French actress
- Yves Debay (1954–2013), French-Belgian journalist

== See also ==
- Deba (disambiguation)
