= Deivapiravi =

Deivapiravi (transl. incarnation) may refer to:

- Deivapiravi (1960 film), an Indian Tamil-language film by Krishnan–Panju
- Deivapiravi (1985 film), an Indian Tamil-language romantic drama film

== See also ==
- Deva (disambiguation)
- Piravi, a 1989 Indian film
