= Ganna =

Ganna may refer to:

- Ganna (name)
- Ganna (cycling team), an Italian professional cycling team, 1913 - 1953
- Ganna (prophet), Germanic prophet and priestess of the 1st century AD
- Ganna, Hungary, village in Hungary
- Caroxylon aphyllum, also known as Ganna, a shrub
- Ganna or Leddat, see Ethiopian Christmas

== See also ==
- Gana (disambiguation)
- Gunna (disambiguation)
- Gaana, a type of Tamil song
- Gaana, an Indian commercial music streaming service
