= Gunna =

Gunna most commonly refers to:

- Gunna (rapper) (Sergio Giavanni Kitchens, born 1993), American rapper, singer, and songwriter

Gunna may also refer to:

== Places ==
- Gunna, Scotland, an unpopulated island in Inner Hebrides
- Gunna, New South Wales, Australia, in Leichhardt County

== Art and media ==
- Gunna (comics), a Thunderbolts character
- Gunna (film), a 2005 Kannada romance-action-drama

== People ==
- Gunna Breuning-Storm (1891–1966), Danish violinist and music teacher
- Gunna Grähs (born 1954), Swedish illustrator

== See also ==
- Ganna (disambiguation)
- Gunner (disambiguation)
