= Dev =

Dev, devs, or DEV may refer to:

== People ==
=== Single names ===
- Dev (artist) (born 1947), Indian artist and poet
- Dev (Bengali actor) (born 1982), Indian actor
- Dev (DJ) (born 1984), British radio presenter, DJ and actor
- Dev (singer) (born 1989), American singer
- Dev Ramnath, Indian actor

=== First names ===
- Dev Anand (1923–2011), Indian actor
- Dev Griffin (born 1984), British DJ
- Dev Hynes (born 1985), British musician
- Dev Kumar (born 1972), Indian writer
- Dev Patel (born 1990), British actor

=== Surnames ===
- Aditya Dev (born 1988), Indian body builder with dwarfism
- Ajinkya Dev, Indian actor
- Arjun Dev (historian) (1938–2020), Indian historian and educationist
- Deepak Dev (born 1978), Indian composer
- Gokul Inder Dev (1938–2019), Indian cricketer
- Govinda Chandra Dev (1907–1971), Bangladeshi philosophy professor
- K. J. Kapil Dev, Indian volleyball player
- Kanhad Dev (fl. 1298–1299), Indian maharaja
- Kapil Dev (born 1959), Indian cricketer
- Kesava Dev (1904–1983), Indian writer
- Mukul Dev (1970–2025), Indian actor
- Rahul Dev (born 1968), Indian actor and model
- Rajan P. Dev (1951–2009), Indian actor

== Entertainment ==
- Dev (2004 film), a Hindi film
- Dev.D, a 2009 Hindi film
- Dev (2019 film), a Tamil film
- Dev (TV series), a 2017 Indian television show
- Devs (TV series), a 2020 American miniseries
- Brahmāstra: Part Two – Dev, an upcoming Indian fantasy film, second in the Āstraverse

== Technology ==
- /dev, a directory in the Unix file system
- DEVS, discrete event system specification
- A software developer

== Other uses ==
- Éamon de Valera, Irish politician sometimes known colloquially as Dev
- Dev (mythology), monstrous ogre or fiend in Iranian mythology and mythologies influenced by it
- DEV, Chapman code for Devon, a county in the west of England

== See also ==
- .dev, a top-level domain
- Deva (disambiguation)
- Developer (disambiguation)
