= List of Daewoo models =

This article is an overview of the past products of Daewoo Motor and GM Daewoo.

== Former GM Daewoo range ==
- Matiz Classic M200
- Matiz Creative M300
- Gentra/Gentra X T200/T250
- Lacetti Premiere J300
- Tosca Premium6 V250
- Alpheon VS300
- Veritas
- Winstorm C100
- Winstorm MaXX C100
- Damas and Labo minivan and mini pick-up

== Exhaustive list of Daewoo Motor and GM Daewoo passenger cars ==
=== Daewoo-based models ===
- Espero - Aranos (1990–1997)

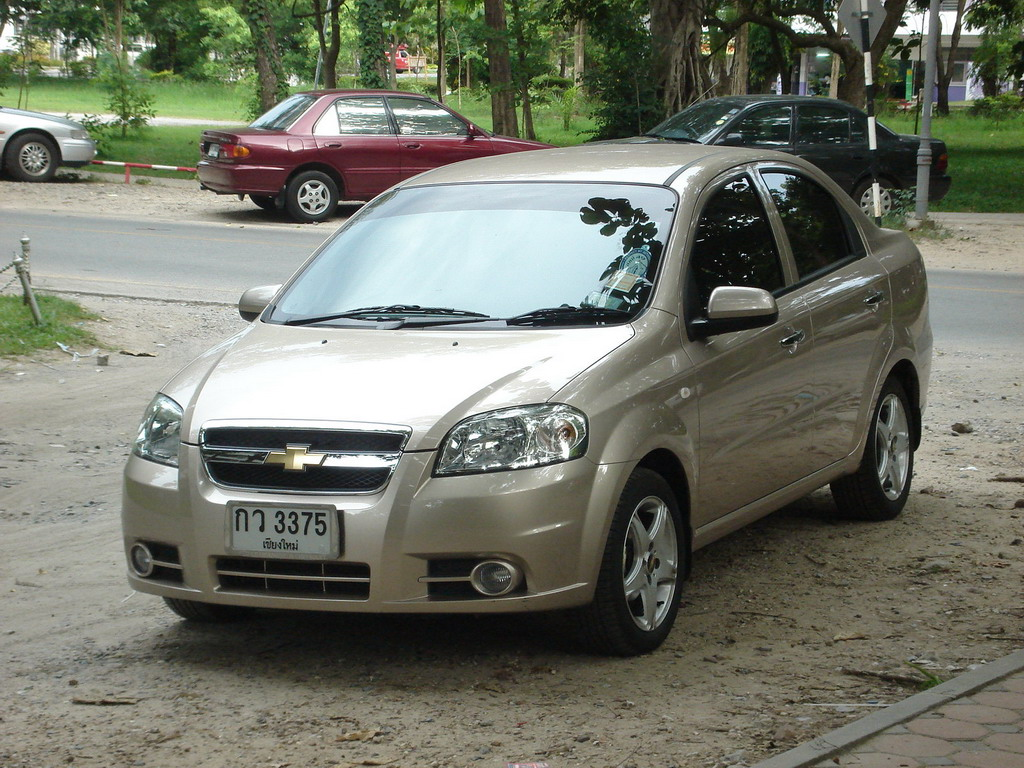
A T250 Chevrolet Aveo (GM Daewoo Gentra) in Thailand

- Kalos - Gentra/Gentra X T200-T250 (2002–2011)

Also marketed as the Chevrolet Aveo/Kalos/Lova, Holden Barina, Pontiac Wave/G3, and the Suzuki Swift+

- Lacetti J200 (2003–2009)

Also marketed as the Suzuki Forenza, Chevrolet Optra/Lacetti, Holden Viva and Buick Excelle/Excelle HRV

- Lacetti Premiere J300 (2008–2016)

Also marketed as Holden Cruze, is the South Korean version of Chevrolet Cruze

- Lanos T100 (1996–2002)

Also marketed as the Doninvest Assol, ZAZ Lanos/Sens/Chance, FSO Lanos and Chevrolet Lanos

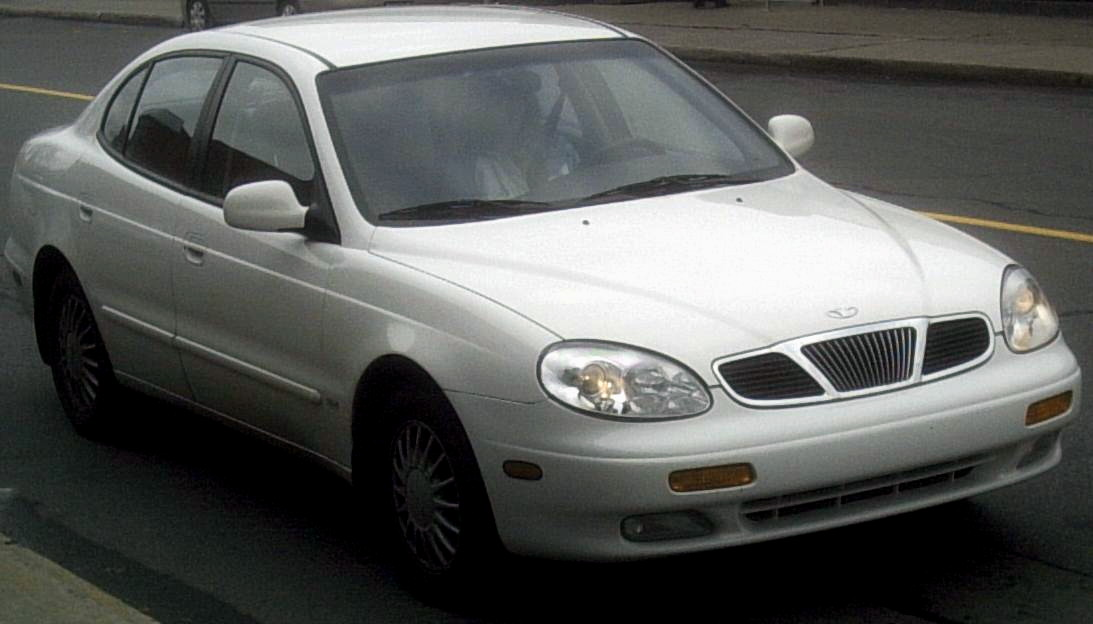
A V100 Daewoo Leganza

- Leganza V100 (1997–2002)

Also marketed as the Doninvest Kondor

- Magnus - Evanda V200 (2000–2006)

Also marketed as the Chevrolet Epica/Evanda, Suzuki Verona, Formosa Magnus

- Matiz M100-M150-M200 (1998–2009)

Also marketed as the Chevrolet Matiz/Spark/Joy/Exclusive, Formosa Matiz, FSO Matiz and Pontiac Matiz G2

- Matiz Creative M300 (2009–2016)

Also marketed as the 2010 Chevrolet Spark

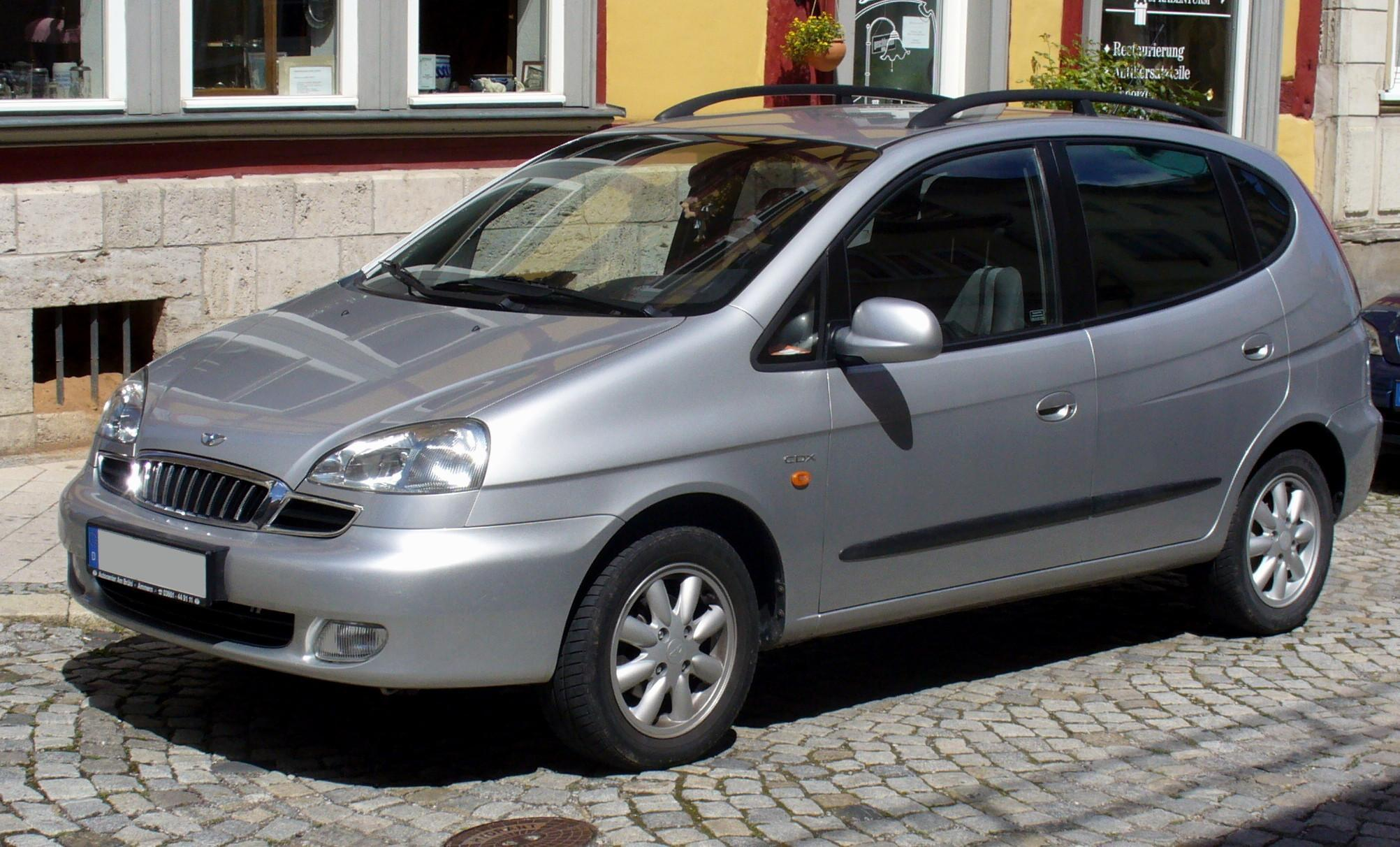
The U100 Daewoo Rezzo

- Nubira J100 (1997–2003)

Also marketed as the Doninvest Orion

- Tacuma - Rezzo U100 (2000–2008)

Also marketed as the Chevrolet Tacuma/Rezzo/Vivant

- Tosca V250 (2006–2011)

Also marketed as the Chevrolet Epica or Holden Epica

- Winstorm C100 (2006–2011)

Also marketed as the Chevrolet Captiva and Holden Captiva

- Winstorm MaXX C100 (2008–2011)

Also marketed as the Opel/Vauxhall Antara, Holden Captiva MaXX/Captiva 5, Saturn Vue 2nd generation and UAE GMC Terrain

=== Holden-based models ===
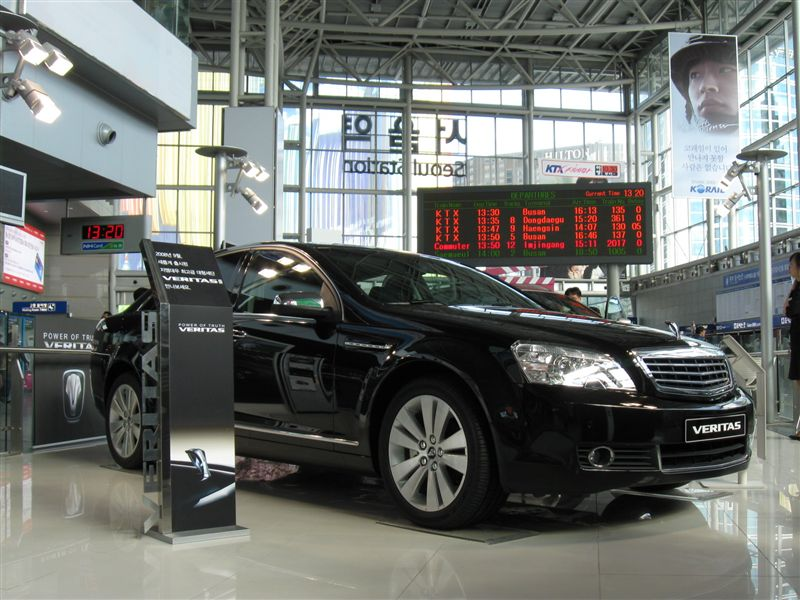
A GM Daewoo Veritas

- Veritas (2008–2011)

Rebadged WM Caprice

- Statesman (2005–2006)

Rebadged WL Statesman

=== Honda-based models ===
- Arcadia (1994–2000)

Rebadged Honda Legend 2nd gen.

=== Opel-based models ===
- Cielo - Nexia (1994–1997)

Based on the Opel Kadett E

- LeMans (1986–1994)

Based on the Opel Kadett E - Variants : Racer (3-door hatchback) and Penta-5 (5-door hatchback) Other names : 1.5i (Australia), Fantasy (Thailand), Pointer, Daewoo Heaven Exported as : Asüna GT (Canada 1991–1993 hatchback), Asüna SE (Canada 1991–1993 sedan), Passport Optima (Canada 1989–1991) and Pontiac LeMans (North America & New Zealand)

- Maepsy-Na (1982–1986)

Based on the Opel Kadett C

- Prince (1991–1997)

Based on the Opel Rekord E, more luxurious variants : Super Salon later renamed Brougham (1991–1999)

- Royale Series

First generation (1975–1978) based on Opel Rekord D Second generation (1980–1991) based on Opel Rekord E, variants : Automatic, Diesel, Duke, Prince, Salon, Salon Super and XQ

=== Nissan-based models ===
- Daewoo Vanette (1986-1992)

Rebadged Nissan Vanette

=== Saturn-based models ===
- G2X (2007–2009)

Rebadged Saturn Sky Red Line

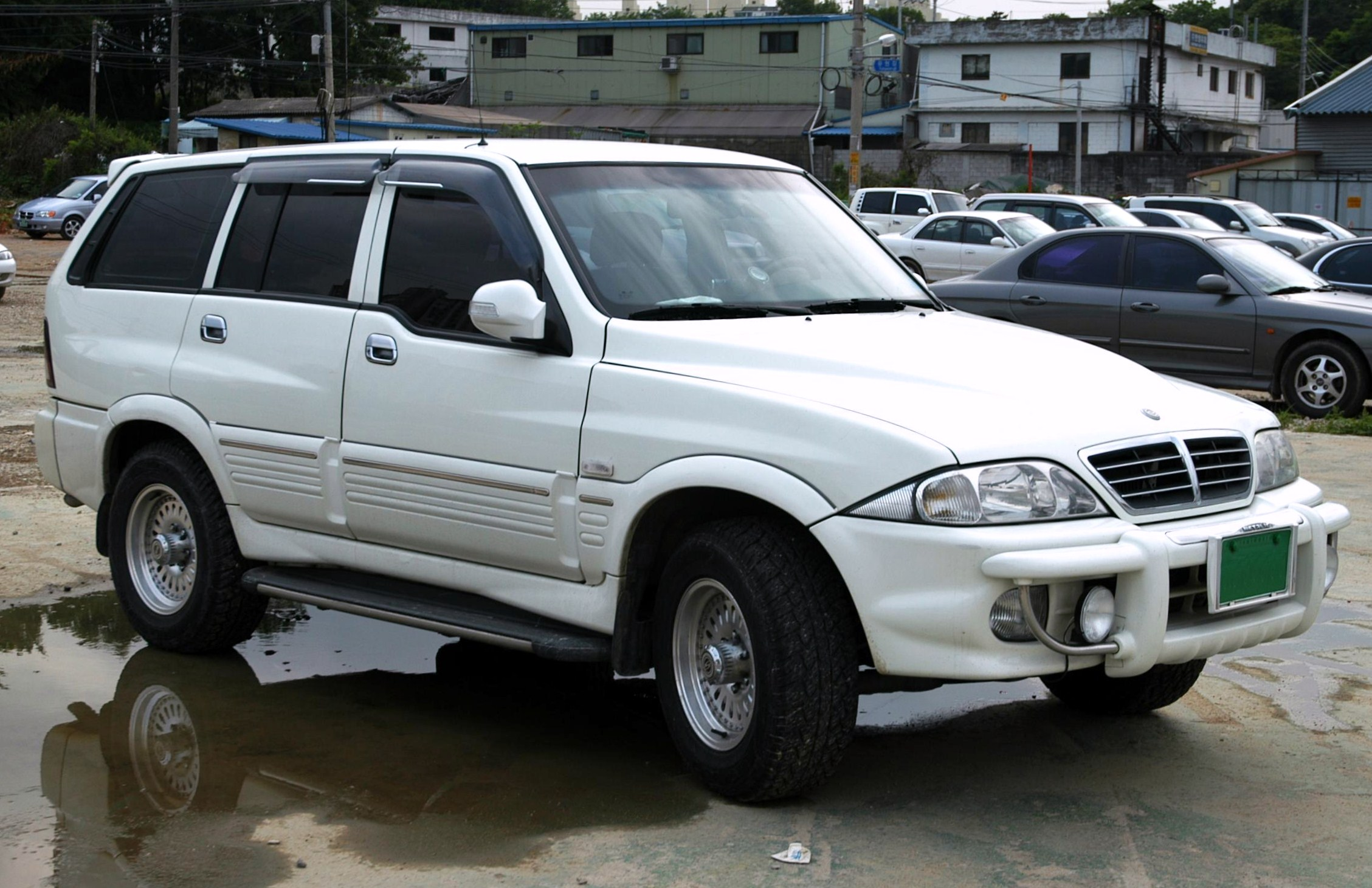
The SsangYong Musso when produced by Daewoo Motor in Korea

=== SsangYong Motor-based models ===
- Chairman

Rebadged SsangYong Chairman

- Istana

Rebadged SsangYong Istana

- Korando (1999–2001)

Rebadged SsangYong Korando

- Musso

Rebadged SsangYong Musso

- Rexton
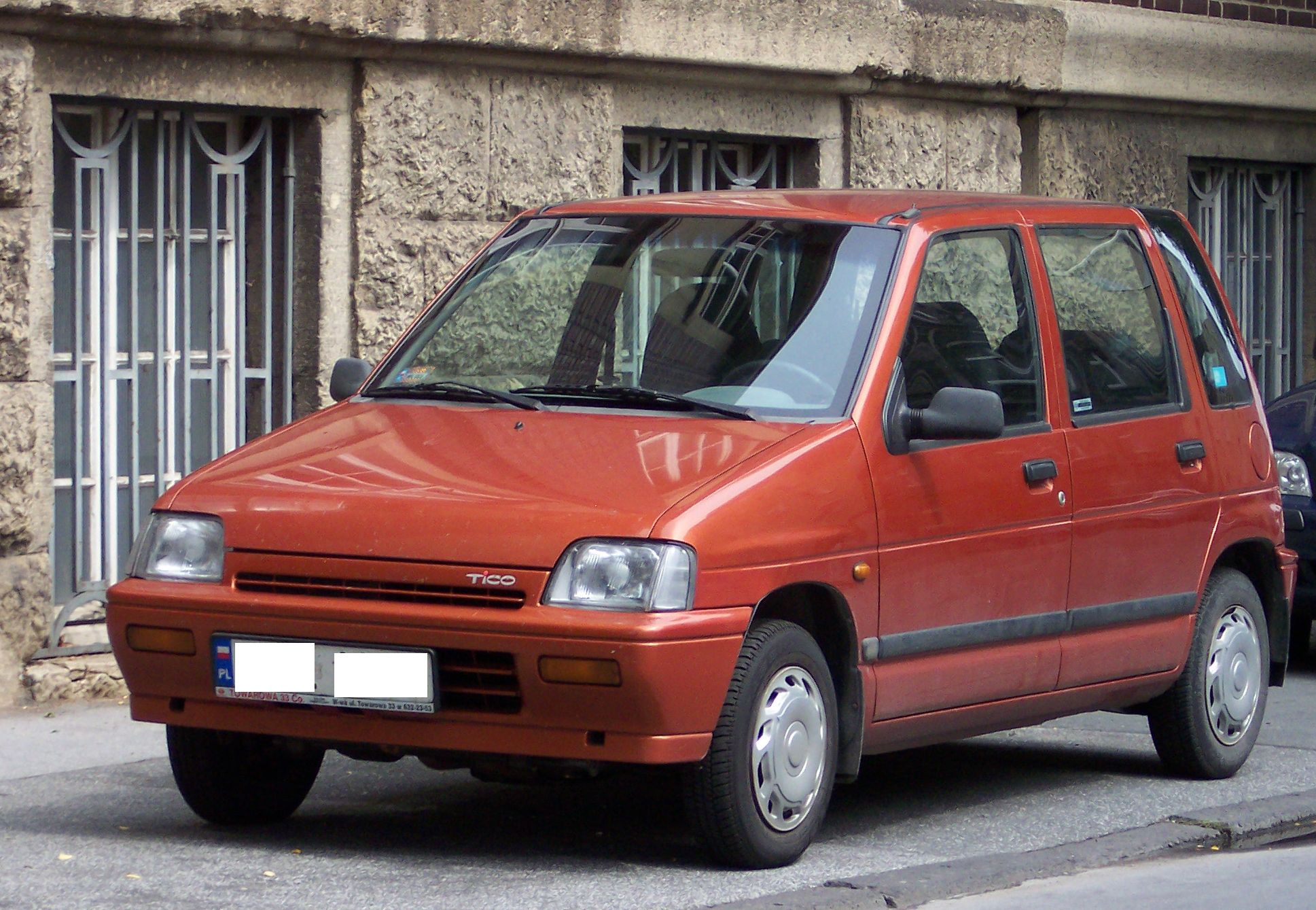
  The Daewoo Tico

Rebadged Ssangyong Rexton

=== Suzuki-based models ===
- Damas - Damas II/Attivo and pick-up version Labo (1991–2021)

Rebadged Suzuki Carry - Also marketed as the Chevrolet CMV/CMP in South America

- Tico/Fino (1991–2001)

Rebadged Suzuki Alto

== Commercial vehicles ==
Daewoo's commercial vehicle business was acquired by Tata Motors in 2004. The business is now known as Tata Daewoo Commercial Vehicle. Daewoo Bus is not owned by Tata.

- Daewoo BM090
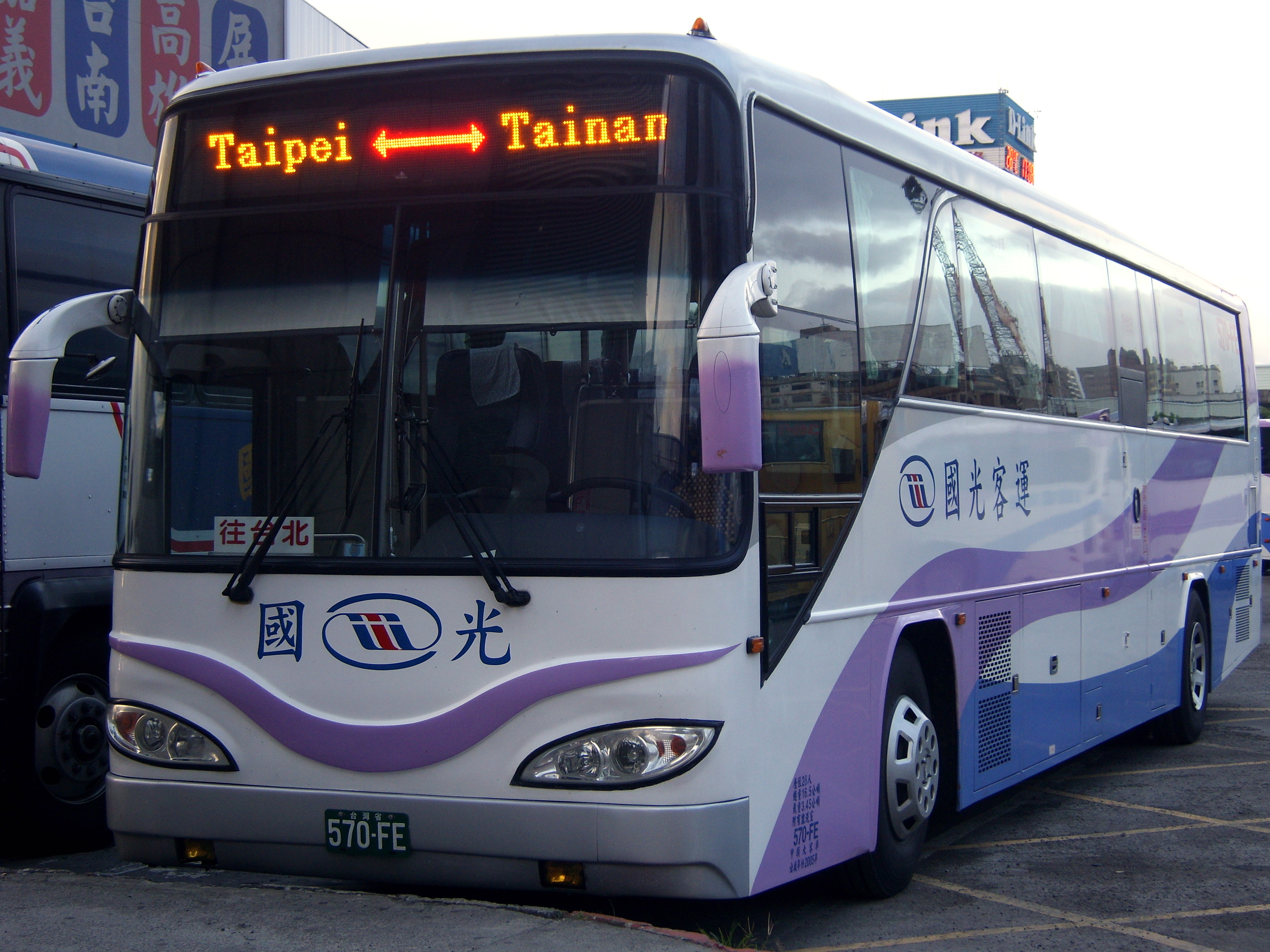
  A Daewoo BH120 bus in Taiwan (ROC)
- Daewoo BS090
- Daewoo BF101/105
- Daewoo BS105/106
- Daewoo BV101
- Daewoo BV113
- Daewoo BH113
- Daewoo BH115
- Daewoo BH115E
- Daewoo BH116
- Daewoo BH117
- Daewoo BH120(H)
- Daewoo Chasedae Truck
- Elf (Rebadged Isuzu Elf)
- Daewoo Lublin

== Concept cars ==
- Daewoo Imago (1993)
- Daewoo DACC-1 (1993) - all 1993 concepts shown in the Taejŏn Expo '93 (Korea)
- Daewoo DEV-2 (1994) - electric vehicle based on the Daewoo Espero
- Daewoo DEV-4 (1994) - electric vehicle based on the Daewoo Cielo
- Daewoo DACC-2 (1994)
- Daewoo No.1 (1995)
- Daewoo No.2 (1995)
- Daewoo Bucrane (1995) - Designed by Giorgetto Giugiaro on the Daewoo Arcadia basis
- Daewoo Mya (1996, 1998)
- Daewoo Tacuma (1997)
- Daewoo Joyster (1997)
- Daewoo Cabriolet (1997) - Lanos cabrio
- Daewoo Matiz (1997)
- Daewoo DEV-5 (1997)
- Daewoo Mantica (1997)
- Daewoo Lanos EV / Nubira HEV / Leganza NGV (1997)
- Daewoo Shiraz (1997) - all 1997 concepts shown in the 1997 Seoul Motor Show
- Daewoo d'Arts City, Sport, Style (1997)
- Daewoo Mirae (1999)
- Daewoo DMS-1 (1999)
- Daewoo DEV 5-5 (1999)
- Daewoo Matiz Decorate (1999)
- Daewoo Tacuma Sport (1999)
- Daewoo Tacuma Style (1999) - presented at the 1999 Tokyo Motor Show
- Daewoo Matiz Canvas Top (1999) - presented at the 1999 Tokyo Motor Show
- Daewoo Korando Camping Car (1999) - presented at the 1999 Tokyo Motor Show
- Daewoo Musiro (2000)
- Daewoo Matiz Track (2000)
- Daewoo Vada (2001)
- GM Daewoo Flex/Universe (2001)
- Daewoo V-222 (2001)
- GM Daewoo Oto/Scope (2003)
- GM Daewoo Speedster (2003)
- GM Daewoo M3X (2004) - third generation of Matiz since 2005
- GM Daewoo S3X (2004) - GM Daewoo Winstorm since 2006
- GM Daewoo T2X (2005)
- Chevrolet WTTC Ultra (2006) - designed by the GM DAT Design Center
- GM Daewoo G2X (2006) - sold in South Korea since the end of 2007
- Chevrolet Trax (2007) - designed by the GM DAT Design Center
- Chevrolet Beat (2007) - designed by the GM DAT Design Center
- Chevrolet Groove (2007) - designed by the GM DAT Design Center
- GM Daewoo L4X - Sold as GM Daewoo Veritas
- Chevrolet Orlando (2009) - designed by the GM DAT Design Center
- Chevrolet Aveo RS Concept (2010) - designed by the GM DAT Design Center, presented at the 2010 Detroit Motor Show

== See also ==
- GM Korea
- Daewoo Bus (not affiliated with GM Korea)
- Daewoo Motor Sales
- Tata Daewoo Commercial Vehicle (not affiliated with GM Korea)
- UzDaewooAuto (not affiliated with GM Korea)
