= Asura =

Mythical beings in Indian religions

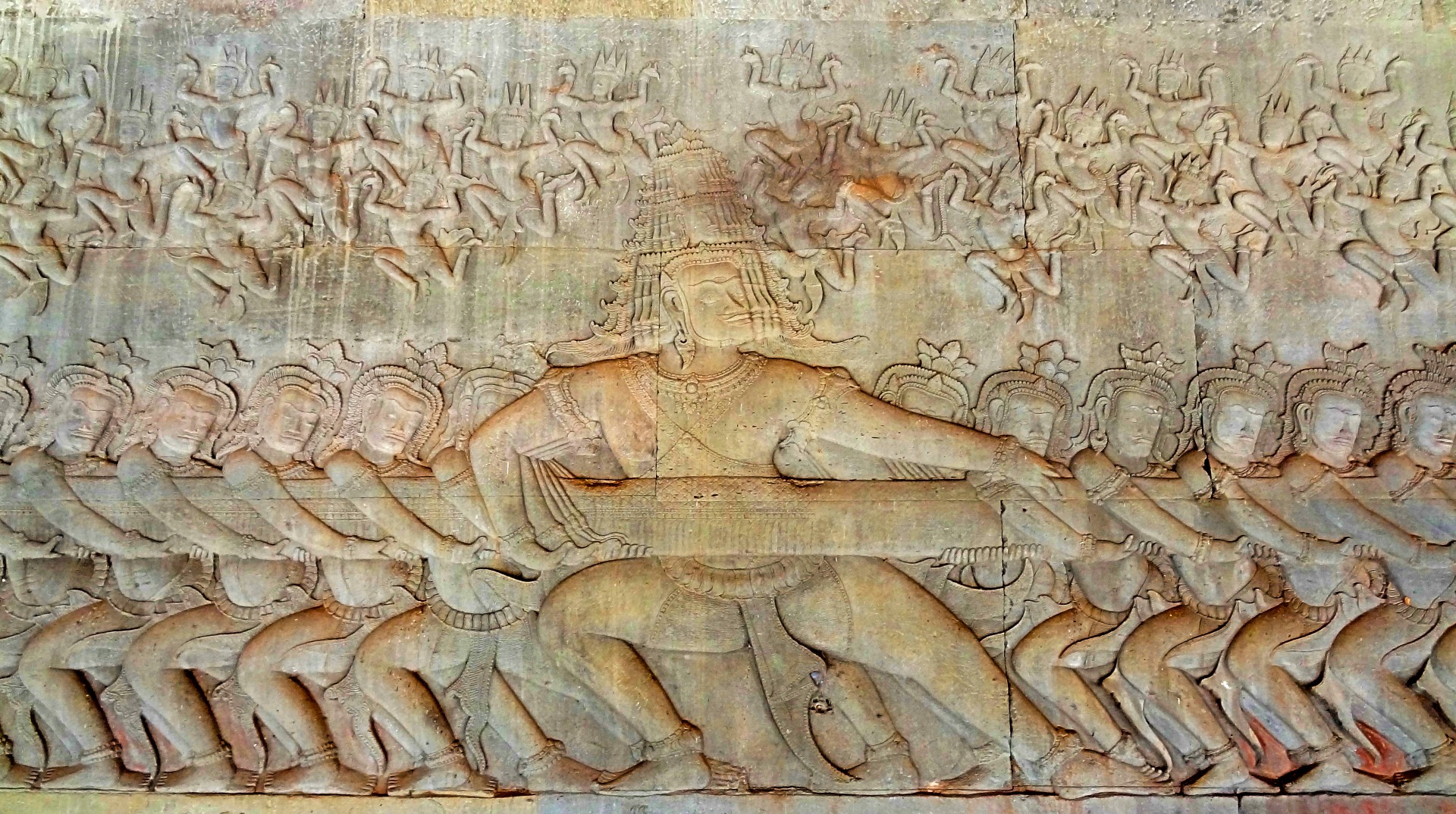
Asura depicted in the Samudra Manthana bas-relief from Angkor Wat

Asura (Sanskrit: असुर) are a class of beings in Indian religions. They are opposite of suras (devas) with the prefix "a", to denote that they are the enemies of suras (devas). They are described as power-seeking beings related to the more benevolent Deva (also known as Sura) in Hinduism. In its Buddhist context, the word is translated as "titan", "demigod", or "antigod".

According to Hindu texts, the Asura and the Deva are in constant fear of each other. Asura are described in Indian texts as powerful superhuman demigods with good or bad qualities. In early Vedic literature, the good Asura are called Aditya and are led by Varuna, while the malevolent ones are called Danava and are led by Vritra. In the earliest layer of Vedic texts, Agni, Indra and other gods are also called Asura, in the sense of their being "lords" of their respective domains, knowledge and abilities. In later Vedic and post-Vedic texts, the benevolent gods are called Deva, while malevolent Asura compete against these Deva and are considered "enemy of the gods".

Asura are part of Hinduism along with Yaksha (nature spirits), Rakshasa (fierce beings or demons), Bhuta (ghosts) and many more. Asura have been featured in many cosmological theories and legends in Hinduism and Buddhism.

== Etymology ==
=== Traditional etymologies ===
Asura is a name given by the Deva to other races collectively, where Asura means not-sura (with sura being another name for Deva).

The 5th century Buddhist philosopher, Buddhaghosa explains that their name derives from the myth of their defeat at the hands of the god Śakra. According to the story, the asura were dispossessed of their state in Trāyastriṃśa because they became drunk and were thrown down Mount Sumeru. After this incident, they vowed never to drink sura again. In some Buddhist literature, they are sometimes referred to as pūrvadeva (Pāli: pubbadeva), meaning "ancient gods."

=== Modern scholarship ===
There is a wide consensus in modern scholarship that the Old Indic term Asura is cognate with Old Iranian Ahura, a term designating a group of benevolent supernatural beings which are in conflict with the malevolent Daevas. Both Sanskrit असुर (asura) and Avestan 𐬀𐬵𐬎𐬭𐬀 (ahura) derive from the common Proto-Indo-Iranian háSura, with the meaning lord. According to Finnish Indologist Asko Parpola, the word *háSura was also borrowed from the Proto-Indo-Iranian language into Proto-Uralic during an early period of contact, in the form *asera-, likewise with the meaning lord or prince. The term is also etymologically related to Old Norse Æsir, indicating that the Indo-Iranian *háSura has an even earlier Proto-Indo-European root.

Monier-Williams traces the etymological roots of asura (असुर) to asu (असु), which means 'life of the spiritual world' or 'departed spirits'.

Monier-Williams (1899) finds that the oldest verses of Vedas (the earliest Samhita layer), the word Asura is used to refer to any spiritual, divine being, including both those with good or with bad intentions, and with constructive or with destructive inclinations or dispositions. Whereas the late verses of the Samhita texts instead describe the Asura as "evil spirits, demons, and opponents of the [sky] gods" [the devas]. In this use of asura it connotes chaos-creating, malevolent, evil faction, in the parts of Indo-Iranian mythology centered on the battle between good and evil.

== In Hindu literature ==
=== Rig Veda ===
Bhargava states the word, asura, including its variants, asurya and asura, occurs "88 times in the Rig Veda, 71 times in the singular number, 4 times in the dual, 10 times in the plural, and 3 times as the first member of a compound. In this, the feminine form, asuryaa, is included twice. The word, asurya, has been used 19 times as an abstract noun, while the abstract form asuratva occurs 24 times, 22 times in one hymn and twice each in two other hymns".

Bhargava gives a count of the word use for every Vedic deity: Asura is used as an adjective meaning "powerful" or "mighty". In the Rig Veda, two generous kings – as well as some priests – have been described as Asura. One hymn requests a son who is an asura. In nine hymns, Indra is described as asura. He is said to possess asurya 5 times, and once he is said to possess asuratva. Agni has total of 12 asura descriptions, Varuna has 10, Mitra has 8, and Rudra has 6. Book 1 of the Rig Veda describes Savitr (Vedic solar deity) as an asura who is a "kind leader".

हिरण्यहस्तो असुरः सुनीथः सुमृळीकः स्ववाँ यात्वर्वाङ् ।
अपसेधन्रक्षसो यातुधानानस्थाद्देवः प्रतिदोषं गृणानः ॥१०॥

May he, gold-handed Asura, kind leader, come hither to us with his help and favour.
Driving off Raksasas and Yatudhanas, [he] the god is present, praised in hymns at evening.
– Translated by Ralph Griffith

The golden-handed lord of good guidance, of good grace, of good help—let him drive in our direction.
Repelling demons and sorcerers, the god has taken his place facing evening, while being hymned.
– Translated by Stephanie W. Jamison, Joel P. Brereton

— Rig Veda 1.35.10

=== Samaveda ===
In the Jaiminya (3.35.3) – one of three recensions of the SamaVeda – the term 'Asura' is stated to be derived from 'rests' (√ram) in the vital airs (asu), i.e. 'Asu' + 'ram' = 'Asuram' (Asura); this is in reference to the mind being 'asura[-like]'.

=== Mahabharata ===
According to the Bhagavad Gita (16.6-16.7), all beings in the universe have both the divine qualities (daivi sampad) and the demonic qualities (asuri sampad) within each. The sixteenth chapter of the Bhagavad Gita states that pure god-like saints are rare and pure demon-like evil are rare among human beings, and the bulk of humanity is multi-charactered with a few or many faults. According to Jeaneane Fowler, the Gita states that desires, aversions, greed, needs, emotions in various forms "are facets of ordinary lives", and it is only when they turn to lust, hate, cravings, arrogance, conceit, anger, harshness, hypocrisy, cruelty and such negativity- and destruction-inclined that natural human inclinations metamorphose into something demonic (Asura).

=== Brahmanda Purana ===
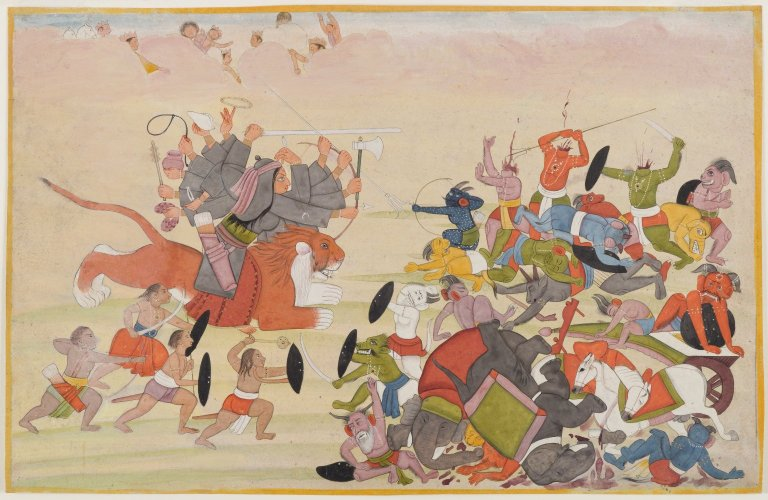
The Mahadevi combatting the asura army (right), folio from the Devi Mahatmya

In the Brahmanda Purana, it is stated the term 'Asura' was used for the Daityas due to their rejection of Varuni (Goddess of Wine) after she emerged from the Ocean of Milk (i.e. 'a-sura', meaning 'those who do not have Sura', that is, 'wine' or more generally 'liquor'). However, in other legends, the Asura accept Varuni (see Kurma).

=== Vishnu Purana ===
According to the Vishnu Purana, during the Samudra Manthana or the "churning of the ocean", the daityas came to be known as Asura because they rejected Varuni, the goddess of sura "wine", while the deva accepted her and came to be known as Sura.

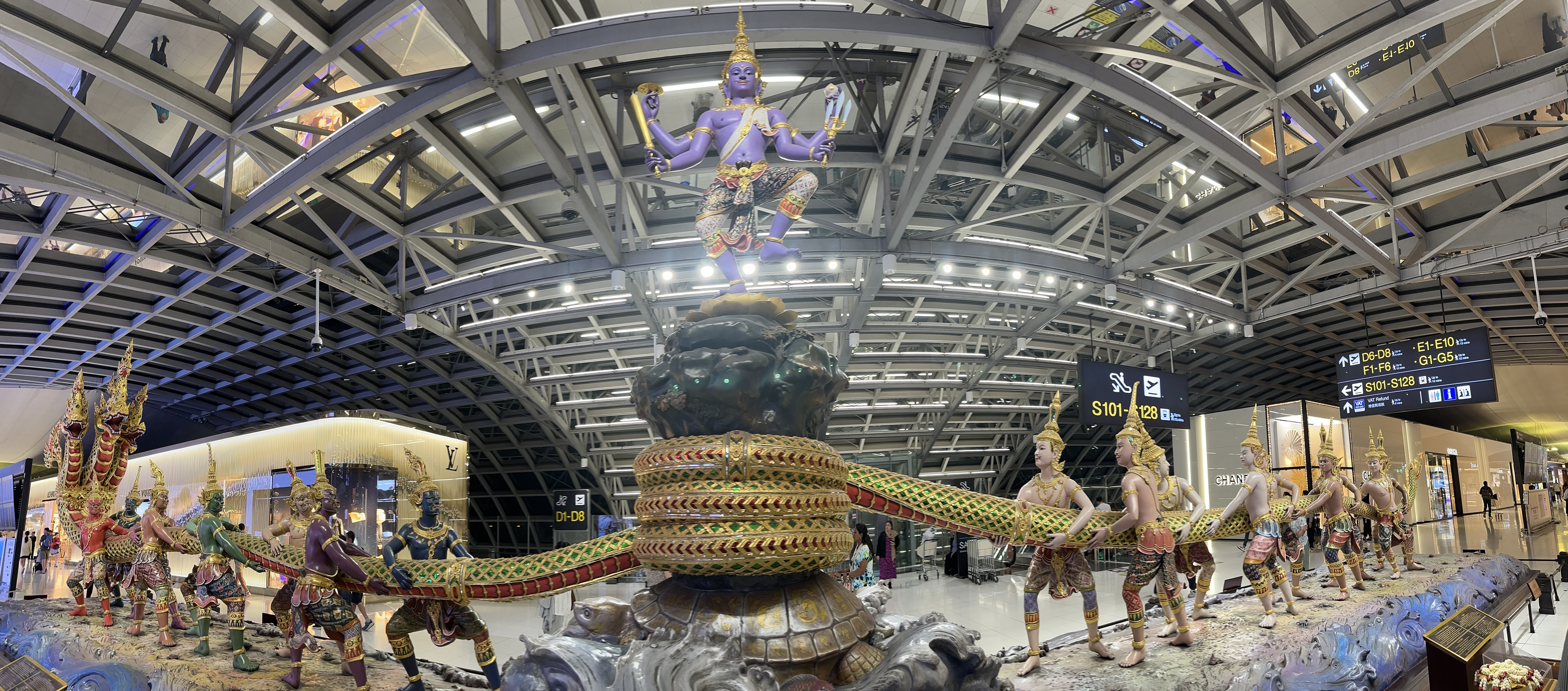
The deva (god) and Asura (anti-god) churning the ocean of milk, Samudra Manthan sculpture at the Suvarnabhumi Airport in Bangkok, Thailand.

=== Shiva Purana ===
Alain Daniélou states that Asura were initially good, virtuous and powerful in Indian legends. However, their nature gradually changed and they came to represent evil, vice and abuse of power. In Shiva Purana, they evolved into anti-gods and had to be destroyed because they threatened the gods.

The Asura (anti-gods) were depicted to have become proud, vain, to have stopped performing sacrifices, to violate sacred laws, not visit holy places, not cleanse themselves from sin, to be envious of deva, torturous of living beings, creating confusion in everything and challenging the deva.

Alain Daniélou states that the concept of Asura evolved with changing socio-political dynamics in ancient India. Asura gradually assimilated the demons, spirits, and ghosts worshipped by the enemies of Vedic people, and this created the myths of the malevolent Asura and the rakshasa. The allusions to the disastrous wars between the Asura and the Sura, found in the Puranas and the epics, may be the conflict faced by people and migrants into ancient India.

== Context ==
Scholars have disagreed on the nature and evolution of the asura concept in ancient Indian literature. The most widely studied scholarly views on Asura concept are those of F.B.J. Kuiper, W. Norman Brown, Haug, von Bradke, Otto, Benveniste, Konow, Rajwade, Dandekar, Darmesteter, Bhandarkar, and Raja, Banerji-Sastri, Padmanabhayya, Skoeld, S.C. Roy, Kumaraswamy, Shamasastry, Przyluski, Schroeder, Burrows, Hillebrandt, Taraporewala, Lommel, Fausboll, Segerstedt, Thieme, Gerschevitch, Boyce, Macdonnell, Hermann Oldenberg, Geldner, Venkatesvaran, and Jan Gonda.

Kuiper calls Asura a special group of gods in one of major Vedic theories of creation of the universe. Their role changes only during and after the earth, sky, and living beings have been created. The sky world becomes that of deva, the underworld becomes that of Asura. The god Indra is the embodiment of good and represents the deva, while the dragon Vrtra is the embodiment of evil and an Asura. During this battle between good and evil, creation and destruction, some powerful Asura side with the good and are called deva, other powerful Asura side with the evil and thereafter continue to be called Asura. This is the first major dualism to emerge in the nature of everything in the Universe. Hale (1999), in his review, states that Kuiper's theory on Asura is plausible, but weak, because the Vedas never call Vrtra (the central character) an Asura, as the text does describe many other powerful beings. Secondly, Rig Veda never explicitly classifies Asura as a "group of gods" states Hale, and this is a presumption of Kuiper.

Many scholars describe Asura to be "lords" with different specialized knowledge, magical powers and special abilities, which only later choose to deploy these for good, constructive reasons or for evil, destructive reasons. The former become known as Asura in the sense of deva, the later as Asura in the sense of demons. Kuiper, Brown, Otto and others are in this school; however, none of them provide an explanation and how, when and why Asura came ultimately to mean demon. Asura are non-believers of God and believe in their own powers.

Ananda Coomaraswamy suggested that deva and Asura can be best understood as being similar in concept to the Twelve Olympians and the titans of Greek mythology: Both are powerful, but have different orientations and inclinations – in Hindu mythology the deva represent the powers of light and the Asura represent the powers of darkness. According to Coomaraswamy (1935), p. 374 "the titan [Asura] is potentially an angel [Deva], the angel still by nature a titan" in Hinduism.

=== Indo-Aryan context ===
In the 19th century, Haug pioneered the idea that the term Asura is linguistically related to the Ahuras of Indo-Aryan people and pre-Zoroastrianism era. In both religions, Ahura of pre-Zoroastrianism (Asura of Indian religions), Vouruna (Varuna) and Daeva (Deva) are found, but their roles are on opposite sides. That is, Ahura evolves to represent the good in pre-Zoroastrianism, while Asura evolves to represent the bad in Vedic religion; where Daeva evolves to represent the bad in pre-Zoroastrianism, while Deva evolves to represent the good in Vedic religion. These contrary roles have led some scholars to infer that there may have been wars between proto-Indo-European communities, and that adapted their gods and demons to reflect their social differences. This idea was thoroughly researched and reviewed by Peter von Bradke in 1885.

The relationship between ahuras / Asura and daevas / deva in Indo-Aryan times, was discussed at length by F.B.J. Kuiper. This theory and other Avesta-related hypotheses developed over the 20th century, are all now in question, particularly for lack of archaeological evidence. Asko Parpola has re-opened this debate by presenting archaeological and linguistic evidence, but notes that the links may go earlier to Uralic languages roots.

=== Relation to Germanic deities ===
Some scholars such as Asko Parpola suggest that the word Asura may be related to proto-Uralic and proto-Germanic history. The Aesir-Asura correspondence is the relation between Vedic Sanskrit Asura and Old Norse Æsir and Proto-Uralic *asera, all of which mean 'lord, powerful spirit, god'. Parpola states that the correspondence extends beyond Asera / Asura, and extends to a host of parallels such as Inmar-Indra, Sampas-Stambha and many other elements of respective mythologies.

== Characteristics ==
In the earliest Vedic literature, all supernatural beings are called deva and Asura. A much-studied hymn of the Rig Veda states Devav asura (Asura who have become deva), and contrasts it with Asura adevah (Asura who are not deva). (Note: see Hale (1999). Note that Hale translates this to "Asuras without the Asura-Devas" in his book (see page 3 for example). The original Sanskrit text of hymns 8.25.4, 8.96.9 from the Rigveda is available on Wikisource.) Each Asura and Deva emerges from the same father (Prajapati), share the same residence (Loka), eat together the same food and drinks (Soma), and have innate potential, knowledge and special powers in Hindu mythology; the only thing that distinguishes "Asura who become Deva" from "Asura who remain Asura" is intent, action and choices they make in their mythic lives.

"Asura who remain Asura" share the character of powerful beings obsessed with their craving for ill-gotten Soma, and for wealth, ego, anger, unprincipled nature, force, and violence. Further, in Hindu mythology, when they lose, miss, or don't get what they want (because they were distracted by their cravings) the "Asura who remain Asura" question, challenge, and attack the "Asura who became deva" to loot or extract a portion of what the deva have and the Asura do not.

The hostility between the two groups is the source of extensive legends, tales, and literature in Hinduism; however, many texts discuss their hostility in neutral terms – without explicit moral connotations or condemnation. Some of these tales constitute the background of major Hindu Epics and annual festivals, such as the story of Asura Ravana and Deva Rama in the Ramayana, and the legend of Asura Hiranyakashipu and Deva Vishnu as Narasimha, the latter celebrated with the Hindu spring festival of Holika and Holi.

In Buddhist mythology, while all the gods of the Kāmadhātu are subject to passions to some degree, the Asura above all are addicted to them, especially wrath, pride, envy, insincerity, falseness, boasting, and bellicosity. The Asura are said to experience a much more pleasurable life than humans, but they are plagued by envy for the deva, whom they can see just as animals perceive humans.

== Symbolism ==
Edelmann and other scholars state that the dualistic concept of Asura and Deva in Hinduism is a form of symbolism found throughout its ancient and medieval literature. In the Upanishads, for example, deva and Asura go to Prajāpati to understand what is Self (Atman, soul) and how to realize it. The first answer that Prajāpati gives is simplistic, which the Asura accept and leave with, but the deva led by Indra do not accept and question because Indra finds that he hasn't grasped its full significance and the given answer has inconsistencies. Edelmann states that this symbolism embedded in the Upanishads is a reminder that one must struggle with presented ideas, learning is a process, and Deva nature emerges with effort. Similar dichotomies are present in the Puranas literature of Hinduism, where god Indra (a Deva) and the antigod Virocana (an Asura) question a sage for insights into the knowledge of the self. Virocana leaves with the first given answer, believing now he can use the knowledge as a weapon. In contrast, Indra keeps pressing the sage, churning the ideas, and learning about means to inner happiness and power. Edelmann suggests that the Deva-Asura dichotomies in Hindu mythology may be seen as "narrative depictions of tendencies within our selves".

The god (Deva) and antigod (Asura), states Edelmann, are also symbolically the contradictory forces that motivate each individual and people, and thus Deva-Asura dichotomy is a spiritual concept rather than mere genealogical category or species of being. In the Bhāgavata Purana, saints and gods are born in families of Asura, such as Mahabali and Prahlada, conveying the symbolism that motivations, beliefs and actions rather than one's birth and family circumstances define whether one is Deva-like or Asura-like.

== Asuri ==
Asuri is the feminine of an adjective from asura and in later texts means 'belonging to or having to do with demons and spirits'. Asuri parallels Asura in being "powerful beings", and in early Vedic texts includes all goddesses. The term Asuri also means a Rakshasi in Indian texts.

The powers of an Asuri are projected into plants offering a remedy against leprosy.

First, before all, the strong-winged Bird was born, thou wast the gall thereof.
Conquered in fight, the Asuri took then the shape and form of plants.
The Asuri made, first of all, this medicine for leprosy, this banisher of leprosy.
She banished leprosy, and gave one general colour to the skin.

— A charm against leprosy, Atharva Veda, Hymn 1.24,

In Book 7, Asuri is a powerful female with the special knowledge of herbs, who uses that knowledge to seduce Deva Indra in Atharva Veda. A hymn invokes this special power in Asuri, and this hymn is stipulated for a woman as a charm to win over the lover she wants.

I dig this Healing Herb that makes my lover look on me and weep,
That bids the parting friend return and kindly greets him as he comes.
This Herb wherewith the Asuri drew Indra downward from the Gods,
With this same Herb I draw thee close that I may be most dear to thee.

Thou art the peer of Soma, yea, thou art the equal of the Sun,
The peer of all the Gods art thou: therefore we call thee hitherward.
I am the speaker here, not thou: speak thou where the assembly meets.
Thou shalt be mine and only mine, and never mention other dames.

If thou art far away beyond the rivers, far away from men,
This Herb shall seem to bind thee fast and bring thee back my prisoner.

— A maiden's love-charm, Atharva Veda, Hymn 7.38,

Similarly, in the Atharva Veda, all sorts of medical remedies and charms are projected as Asuri manifested in plants and animals. Asuri Kalpa is an abhichara (craft) which contains various rites derived from special knowledge and magic of Asuri.

== Buddhism ==
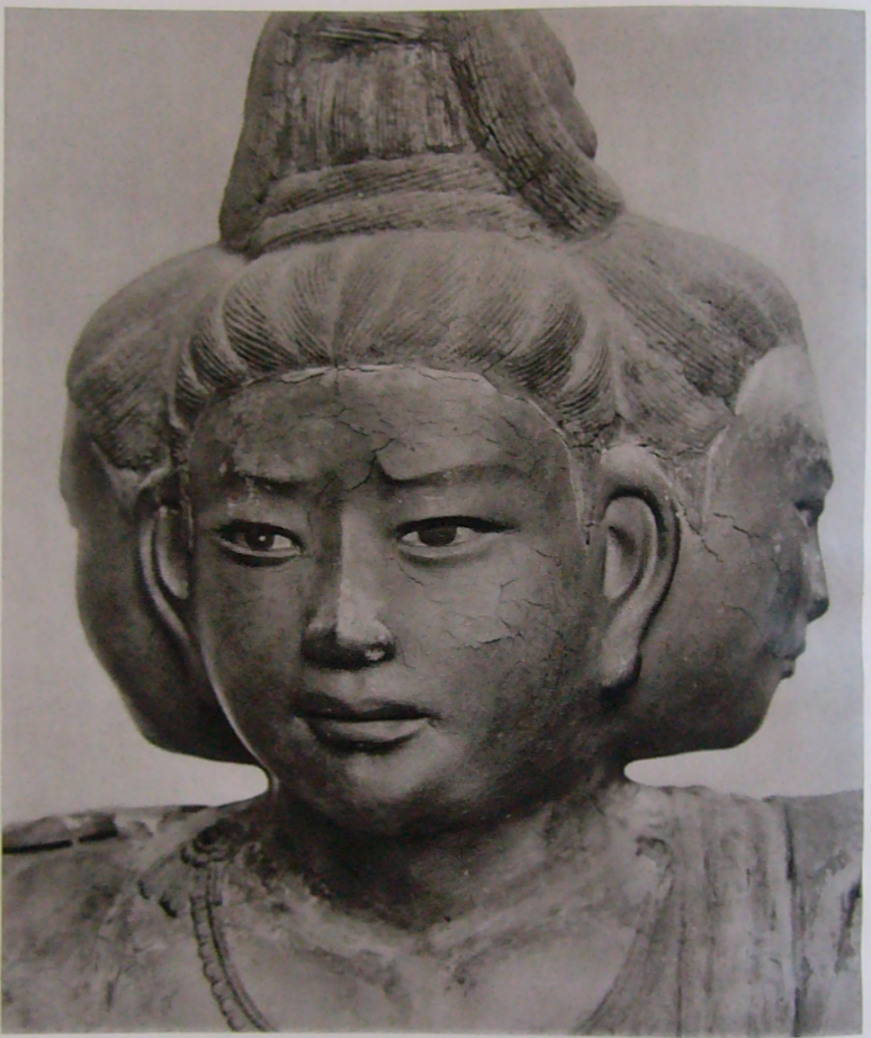
Asura at Kofukuji, a Buddhist temple in Nara, Japan

Asura (Classical Tibetan: ལྷ་མིན, romanized: lha min; simplified Chinese: 阿修罗; traditional Chinese: 阿修羅; pinyin: āxiūluó; Japanese: 阿修羅, romanized: ashura, asura) are a type of supernatural beings (antigods, demigods, or titans) in traditional Buddhist cosmology and a realm of rebirth based on one's karma in current or past lives. They are described in Buddhist texts as creatures who live in lower levels of mount Sumeru, obsessed with sensuous aspects of existence, living with jealousy, and endlessly engaged in wars against the creatures who are deva (gods). As Buddhism spread into East Asia and Southeast Asia, the Asura concept of Indian Buddhism expanded and integrated local pre-existing deities as a part of regional Buddhist pantheon.

=== Asura realm ===
The asura realm is one of the realms in which one can be reborn as a result of experiencing the fruits of wholesome karma, while engaging in unwholesome karma. Generally, the desire realm is recognized as consisting of five realms and the realm of the Asura tends to be included among the deva realms, but the addition of the Asura in the six-world bhavacakra was created in Tibet at the authority of Je Tsongkhapa.

=== Deva-Asura War ===
The Asura were dispossessed of their state in Trāyastriṃśa because they became drunk and were thrown down Mount Sumeru by the bodhisatta, as mentioned in Jatakas. This led to ever lasting war between the deva of Tavatimsa and Asura.

=== Asurendra ===
In Buddhism, the leaders of the Asura are called asurendra (Pāli: Asurinda, 阿修羅王; lit. "Asura-lord"). There are several of these, as the Asura are broken into different tribes or factions. In Pali texts, names that are found include Vepacitti, Rāhu (Verocana), Pahārāda, Sambara, Bali, Sucitti, and Namucī. According to the Lotus Sutra, the four leaders of the Asura took refuge in the Buddha after hearing his sermon.

== See also ==
- Ahura
- Ashur
- Aswang
- Sooranporu
- List of Asuras
  - Daityas
  - Danavas
  - Kalakeyas
  - Nivātakavacas
