= Gana (disambiguation) =

Gana is an attendant of the Hindu god Shiva.

Gana may also refer to:

== Places ==
- Gana, Burkina Faso
- Gana, Iran
- Gana, Poland
- Gana, Tibet
- Ghana Empire, an empire in what is now western Mali that flourished between the fourth and thirteenth centuries

== Politics ==
- Grand Alliance for National Unity, a political party in El Salvador
- Grand National Alliance (Guatemala), a political party in Guatemala
- Gana Perú or Peru Wins, a political party in Peru

== Other uses ==
- Gana people of Botswana
- Ganas, an intentional community in New York City
- Gana (nickname)
- Gaṇa (prosody), a technical term in Sanskrit prosody
- Idrissa Gana Gueye, Senegalese footballer
- Gana or Ledet, see Christmas in Ethiopia and Eritrea
- Gana (film), an Indian Kannada-language science fiction thriller film

== See also ==
- Ganas (disambiguation)
- Ghana (disambiguation)
- Ganna (disambiguation)
- Jana Gana Mana (disambiguation), the national anthem of India
- Ganadevata (disambiguation)
- Gaana, Indian music
- Gaana (music streaming service), Indian website
