= Devas =

Devas may refer to:

- Devas Club, a club in south London
- Anthony Devas (1911–1958), British portrait painter
- Charles Stanton Devas (1848–1906), English political economist
- Jocelyn Devas (died 1886), founder of the Devas Club
- Devas (band), Romanian music band
- Dewas, a city in Madhya Pradesh, India
- Deva (Hinduism) (plural, Devas), masculine deities in Hinduism

== See also ==
- Deva (disambiguation)
