= Dewas (disambiguation) =

Dewas is a town in Dewas District, Madhya Pradesh, India.

It may also refer to:

- Dewas tehsil, the administrative division containing the town
- Dewas district, a district in Madhya Pradesh, India, containing the town and tehsil
- Dewas (Lok Sabha constituency), a constituency in Madhya Pradesh, India
- Dewas (Vidhan Sabha constituency), a constituency in Madhya Pradesh, India
- Dewas State, a territory within central India which was divided in 1728 into:
  - Dewas Junior and Dewas Senior princely states
- Dewas Naka, a residential locality in Indore, Madhya Pradesh, India

== See also ==
- Dewa (disambiguation)
