= Ganna (name) =

Ganna is both an Italian surname, a feminine Ukrainian given name (equivalent of Hanna) and a Maltese name (Ġanna-pronounced Gannah in english). Notable people with the name include:

== Surname ==
- Filippo Ganna (born 1996), Italian cyclist
- Luigi Ganna (1883–1957), Italian cyclist
- Marco Ganna (born 1961), Italian sprint canoeist and father of Filippo

== Given name ==
- Ganna Burmystrova (born 1977), Ukrainian team handball player
- Ganna Gryniva (born 1989), Ukrainian jazz singer
- Ganna Ielisavetska, Ukrainian Paralympic swimmer
- Ganna Khlistunova (born 1988), Ukrainian swimmer
- Ganna Pushkova-Areshka (born 1978), Belarusian sprint canoeist
- Ganna Rizatdinova (born 1993), Ukrainian rhythmic gymnast
- Ganna Siukalo (born 1976), Ukrainian team handball player
- Ganna Smirnova, Ukrainian dancer
- Hanna Solovey (born 1992), Ukrainian cyclist
- Ganna Sorokina (born 1976), Ukrainian diver
- Ganna Walska (1887–1984), Polish opera singer
