= Devic =

Devic may refer to:

- Eugène Devic (1858–1930), French neurologist
- Émilien Devic (1888–1944), French footballer
- Devic kingdom, the realm of devas, non-physical beings described in certain doctrines, religions and popular culture
- Devics, a band from Los Angeles, United States
- Devič, a Serb Orthodox abbey in Kosovo
- Neuromyelitis optica, Devic's disease or Devic's syndrome

== See also ==
- Dević, a surname
