= Ganas (disambiguation) =

Ganas may refer to:

- Ganaş (Hungarian: Gánás), a village in Acâș Commune, Satu Mare County, Romania
- Ganas, an intentional community on Staten Island, New York

== People ==
- Michalis Ganas (1944–2024), Greek poet
- Rusty Ganas (born 1949), American football player

== See also ==
- Gana (disambiguation)
  - Ganas, a company of beings in Hinduism
