= Dewa =

Dewa may refer to:

- Dewa, India, a town in Indian state of Uttar Pradesh
- Dewa Province, a province in Japan
- Dewa (band), an Indonesian rock band
- Dewa (people), a Sri Lankan people/population
- Dewa, Togo
- Dubai Electricity and Water Authority
- Dewa (TV series), an Indonesian soap opera

== People with the surname ==
- Dewa Shigetō (出羽 重遠, 1856 – 1930), Imperial Japanese Navy admiral

== See also ==
- Deva (disambiguation)
- Dewas (disambiguation)
