= Devta =

Devta may refer to:

- Devata, concept of deity in Indian religions
- Devta (1956 film), a 1956 Indian Hindi-language swashbuckler film
- Devta (1983 film), a 1983 Indian Marathi-language action drama film by Kamalakar Torne
- Devta (1998 film), a 1998 Indian Hindi-language film action film by Jagdish A. Sharma, starring Mithun Chakraborty
- Devta (novel), a serialized Urdu fantasy thriller novel by Pakistani writer Mohiuddin Nawab

== See also ==
- Devatha (disambiguation)
- Diwata (disambiguation)
- Deva (disambiguation)
