= Diwata =

Diwata is another term for nature spirit, fairy and deities or ancestor spirits (anito) in the Visayan, Palawan, and Mindanao regions in the indigenous Filipino animistic beliefs. It can also refer to:

- "Diwata" (song), a song by Filipino rapper Abra featuring Chito Miranda
- Diwata-1, a Philippine microsatellite launched to the International Space Station (ISS) on March 23, 2016
- Diwata-2, a Philippine microsatellite launched on October 29, 2018
- Mount Diwata, a volcanic mountain range in the Davao Region of Mindanao, Philippines
- Diwata (entrepreneur) (born 1982), Filipino internet personality and stall owner
- Dwta (born 2001), Filipino singer
- Christopher Diwata, Filipino comedian, influencer and commercial model

== See also ==
- Devta (disambiguation)
- Devatha (disambiguation)
