= The Gunners =

The Gonners may refer to:

- Arsenal F.C., an English association football club
- The Royal Artillery, a British Army regiment

== See also ==
- Gunner (disambiguation)
