= Mariana Sadovska =

Ukrainian musician (born 1972)

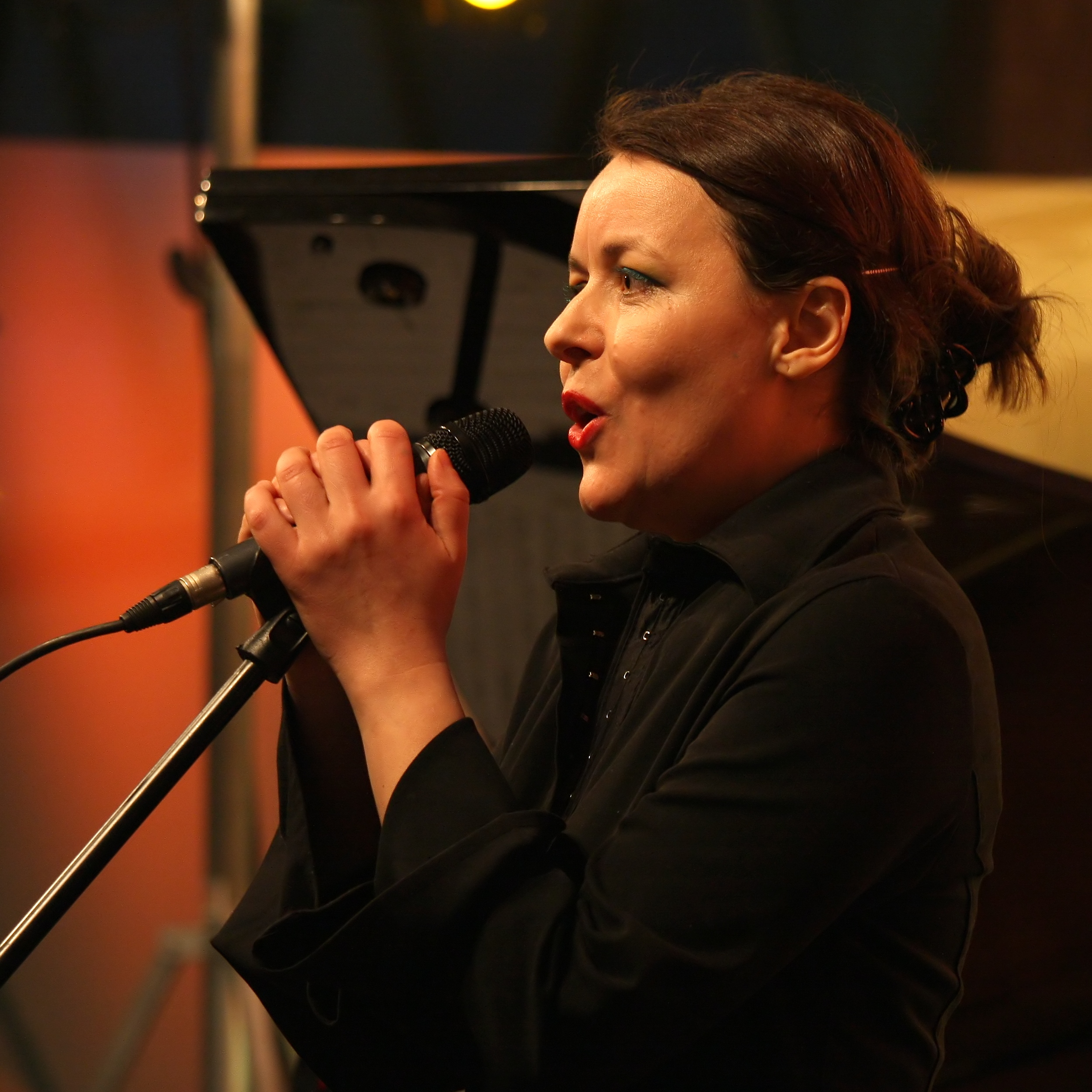
Mariana Sadovska performing in Cologne, 2009

Mariana Sadovska (born 1972, Lviv, Ukraine) is a Ukrainian actress, singer, musician, recording artist, and composer, resident in Cologne.

== Biography ==
Sadovska began her work with Les Kurbas Theater (Lviv, Ukraine) at Anatole Vasiliev's Festivals in St. Petersburg and Moscow. There, she was tapped for the Slavic Pilgrim Project by Jerzy Grotowski in Pontedera, Italy. Later that year, she was invited to join Theater Gardzienice where she worked for 10 years as an actor and music director. During her tenure with Gardzienice, she conducted ethnomusicological expeditions to Ukraine, Ireland, Egypt, Cuba and Brazil. She has since organized many cultural exchanges between contemporary artists from Europe and the United States with the traditional singers of Ukraine.

In 2001, she moved to New York with a grant from the Earth Foundation. There she worked as a music director at La Mama, with E.T.C.'s resident theater company, Yara Arts Group.

During her residence in New York City, she began working on her solo performances as well as collaborations with such artists as Julian Kytasty, Michael Alpert (of Brave Old World), Anthony Coleman, Frank London, Victoria Hanna and Sanda.

In 2001, Global Village produced her first solo CD, Songs I learned in Ukraine. In 2005, Sadovska and EVOE group produced her second solo CD, Borderland. Since then she had appearances at the Knitting Factory, Joe's Pub, BAM, Macor, Galapagos and Exit Art.

She teaches workshops on vocal techniques which she has collected through her travels at the Grotowski Center (Poland), Giving Voice Festival (UK), International Workshop Festival (Israel), The Royal Shakespeare Co. (London), as well as many academic institutions, including Harvard, Swarthmore, SUNY Buffalo, NYU and UC Santa Barbara.

In July 2005, she taught workshops at the University of Kabul (Afghanistan). In 2006, she was a guest musical director for the Art Atelier Program curated by Toni Morrison at Princeton University. In 2008, Sadovska became a Fulbright scholar.

Sadovska was one of the musicians from Ukraine in Germany when Russia invaded the country in 2022. She sang at a concert "Songs of Wounding" with Ganna Gryniva and others in support of Ukraine on 17 March.

== Family ==
Her father is Ukrainian singer, songwriter, and translator Viktor Morozov. She is married to the German performance artist Andre Erlen.

== Discography ==
- Vesna (Flowfish Records 2015)
- Vesna (Wizmar Records 2010)
- Borderland (Wizmar Records 2005)
- Gardzienice's Metamorfozy (Altmaster, Poland, 2000)
- Songs I Learned in Ukraine (Global Village Music, US, June 2001)
- Song Tree, 2001 in collaboration with Radio Lublin (Poland), Yara Arts Group (US) (UNESCO-produced)
