= Devatha (disambiguation) =

Devata is the Hindu term for guardian spirits, and the plural form of Deva.

Devata or Devatha may also refer to these Indian films:

- Devata (1941 film), Telugu film
- Devata (1965 film), Telugu film
- Devatha (1965 film), Malayalam film
- Devata (1978 film), Hindi film
- Devata (1982 film), Telugu film

== See also ==
- Devta (disambiguation)
- Diwata (disambiguation)
- Deva (disambiguation)
- Ganadevata (disambiguation)
- Devatha – Anubandhala Alayam, an Indian Telugu-language TV show
- Devathai, a 1997 Indian Tamil-language fantasy film
- Devathai (2013 TV series), an Indian Tamil-language soap opera
