= Gunner =

Gunner, the Gunner, Gunners or the Gunners may refer to:

== Places ==
- Gunner Bay, Bermuda
- Gunner River, New Zealand
- Gunners Park and Shoebury Ranges, a nature reserve in Essex, England
- Gunners Pond, Newfoundland and Labrador, Canada
- Mount Gunner, Ross Dependency, Antarctica

== People ==
- Gunner (name), a list of people with the nickname, given name or surname
- Gunner, a nickname used by rapper MGK
- Jaxson Ryker (Chad Lail), professional wrestler who was wrestled with his ring name Gunner (born 1982)
- Gunner Scott, ring name of retired professional wrestler Brent Albright (born 1978)
- Gunner (student), a slang term in medical or law school for a hyper-competitive student
- Gunner, a nickname for Guns N' Roses fans

== Military ==
=== Rank or role ===
- Gunner (artillery), a member of the crew operating a crew-served weapon, such as an artillery piece
- Gunner (rank), a rank equivalent to private in a Commonwealth artillery corps
- Gunner, formerly a gunnery warrant officer of the British Royal Navy or Royal Marines
- Gunner, in armored, reconnaissance or mechanized units, a soldier who occupies a dedicated gun position in a military vehicle
- Machine gunner, in infantry platoons, a specialist trained in using machine guns
- Air gunner, or aerial gunner, a member of an aircrew who operates a machine gun or auto-cannon
- Infantry weapons officer, commonly referred to as gunner, a non-technical chief warrant officer in the United States Marine Corps

=== Other ===
- Fairchild AT-21 Gunner, an American World War II specialized bomber crew trainer
- Gunner (dog), a dog noted for his ability to hear Japanese air raids approaching Darwin, Australia, in the Second World War
- The Gunners, a nickname for the British Royal Artillery

== Sports ==
=== Teams ===
- Albuquerque Gunners, a former name (1987-1989) of the defunct New Mexico Chiles soccer club
- Ballygunner GAA, Waterford, Ireland, a hurling club
- Canberra Gunners, an Australian basketball team based in Canberra
- Charleston Gunners, a short-lived Premier Basketball League team based in Charleston, West Virginia
- Edinburgh Gunners, nickname and former official name for Edinburgh Rugby, a Scottish rugby team
- Ellesmere Port Gunners, a defunct English speedway team in Ellesmere Port, Wirral (1972-1985)
- Fredericksburg Gunners, a defunct American soccer team based in Fredericksburg, Virginia (2006-2009)
- Garrison Gunners, one of the two teams in the Isles of Scilly Football League
- Gunners F.C., a Zimbabwean football club based in Harare
- Oberwart Gunners, a basketball club based in Oberwart, Austria
- Puget Sound Gunners FC, a defunct American soccer team based in Issaquah, Washington (2010-2015)
- St. Louis Gunners, a former independent football based in St. Louis, Missouri, that briefly played in the National Football League
- The Gunners, nickname for Arsenal F.C., a London football club

=== Position ===
- Gunner (American football), an American football player tasked with sprinting to tackle a kick returner

== Arts and entertainment ==
- "Gunner" (The Punisher episode), an episode of The Punisher
- Gunner Henderson, a fictional character appearing in The Punisher television series
- The Gunner, a 1928 crime novel by Edgar Wallace
- Gunner (film), a 2024 American action thriller starring Morgan Freeman and Luke Hemsworth.

== Other uses ==
- Gunner (cocktail)
- Gunner and Company, the last provincial private bank in the United Kingdom, bought out in 1953

== See also ==
- The Gunners (disambiguation)
- Gunnery (disambiguation)
- Gunna (disambiguation)
- Gunnar, a given name
