= Deve =

Deve may refer to:

== Places ==
- Dèvè, Benin
- Deve, Albac, Romania

== People ==
- Deve Toganivalu (1864–1939), Fijian politician
- Suzanne Devé (1901–1994), French tennis player
- H. D. Deve Gowda (born 1933), former prime minister of India

== Other uses ==
- European Parliament Committee on Development

== See also ==
- Deva (disambiguation)
- Deves Insurance, a Thai insurance company
