= Ghana (disambiguation) =

Ghana is a nation in Lower West Africa.

Ghana may also refer to:

- Ghana Empire, a medieval empire in Upper West Africa
- Ghana (Mbeya ward), a ward in Tanzania
- Għana (folk music), a type of Maltese folk music
- Ghana (album), an album by the Mountain Goats
- Ghana (chocolate bar), manufactured by Korean company Lotte

== See also ==
- Gana (disambiguation)
- Gahanna, Ohio
- Guinea
- Guyana
