= Gunner (dog) =

Alarm-raising dog in Darwin, Australia during World War II

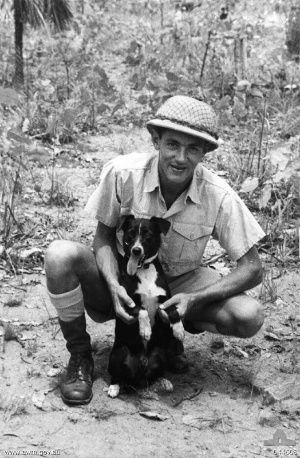
- Gunner with his handler Percy Westcott
- Species: Canis familiaris
- Breed: Kelpie
- Sex: Male
- Born: c. August 1941; Darwin, Northern Territory, Australia
- Died: April 30, 1955 (aged 13)
- Nationality: Australian
- Employer: Royal Australian Air Force
- Years active: 1942–1945
- Known for: Air-raid early warning during World War II
- Owner: Percy Westcott
- Named after: Gunner (rank)

Gunner (born c. August 1941-April 30, 1955) was a male kelpie dog who became notable for his reliability to accurately alert Allied air force personnel that Japanese military aircraft were approaching Darwin during the Second World War.

== Biography ==
The origins of the black and white male kelpie have never been ascertained. He appears to have been a six-month-old stray when he was found on 19 February 1942, under the ruins of a mess hut at RAAF Darwin, following the first Japanese air raid on Darwin. He was found by personnel from No. 2 Squadron, Royal Australian Air Force (RAAF) who heard the dog whimpering, as result of a broken front leg. The dog was taken to a field hospital, where a medical officer reportedly insisted that he could not treat a patient without knowing their name and number. After being informed that the patient's name was "Gunner" and his number was "0000", the doctor set and plastered Gunner's leg. At that point, Gunner officially entered the records of the RAAF.

Leading Aircraftman Percy Westcott, one of those who had found Gunner, assumed ownership of him and became his master and handler. The young dog was badly shaken by his experiences, but quickly responded to the attention of Westcott and other personnel from 2 Squadron.

About a week later, Gunner first demonstrated his remarkable hearing skills. As the RAAF personnel went about their daily routine at the airfield, Gunner became agitated and started to whine and jump. Not long afterwards, the sound of approaching aircraft engines was heard by the airmen. A few minutes later, a formation of Japanese raiders appeared above Darwin and began bombing and strafing the town. Two days later, Gunner again began whimpering and jumping, and not long afterwards came another air attack. This pattern was repeated over the weeks that followed. Long before the sirens sounded, Gunner would become agitated and head for shelter. Gunner's hearing was so acute he was able to warn RAAF personnel of approaching Japanese aircraft, up to 20 minutes before they arrived and before they were detected by the rudimentary radar systems available at the time. Gunner did not behave the same way when he heard Allied planes approaching; he could differentiate between the sounds of the engines used by Allied and Japanese aircraft. Gunner was so reliable that the commanding officer of 2 Squadron, Wing Commander Tich McFarlane, gave approval for Westcott to sound a portable air raid siren whenever Gunner's whining or jumping alerted him. Later, when a number of stray dogs were roaming the base and becoming a nuisance, McFarlane ordered that all dogs other than Gunner were to be shot.

Gunner became such a part of the air force that he slept under Westcott's bunk, showered with the men in the shower block, sat with the men at the outdoor movie pictures, and went up with the pilots during practice take-off and landings. When Westcott was posted to Melbourne 18 months later, Gunner stayed in Darwin, looked after by the RAAF butcher. Gunner's fate is undocumented.

== See also ==
- Dickin Medal
- PDSA Gold Medal
- Dogs in warfare
- Gunner
- List of individual dogs
