= Ganadevata =

Ganadevata may refer to:

- Gana, a class of deities in Hinduism
- Ganadevata (novel), a 1942 Bengali-language novel by Indian writer Tarasankar Bandyopadhyay
- Ganadevata (film), a 1978 Indian Bengali-language film adaptation by Tarun Majumdar
- Ganadevata Express, an express train in India

== See also ==
- Gana (disambiguation)
- Devata (disambiguation)
