= Deba =

Deba may refer to:

== Geography ==
- Deba (crater), a crater on Mars
- Deba (river), a river in the Basque Country
- Deba, Gipuzkoa, a town in the Basque Country
- Deba, Gombe, a town in the Yamaltu/Deba Local Government Area of Gombe State, Nigeria
- Dęba (disambiguation), various settlements in Poland

== People ==
- Deba Prasad Das (1932–1986), Indian dancer
- Deba Gupta (1911–1930), Bengali revolutionary
- Deba Hekmat (born c. 2001), Kurdish-British model and actress
- Deba Wieland (1916–1992), German journalist
- Bizunesh Deba (born 1987), Ethiopian long-distance runner
- Melvine Deba (born 1998), French handballer

== Other ==
- Deba (moth), a genus of moths of the family Crambidae
- Deba bōchō, a Japanese-style kitchen knife

== See also ==
- Deva (disambiguation)
