= Igor Dević =

Croatian footballer

Personal information
- Full name: Igor Dević
- Date of birth: 9 March 1984 (age 42)
- Place of birth: Zagreb, SFR Yugoslavia
- Height: 1.81 m (5 ft 11 1/2 in)
- Position: Defensive midfielder

Youth career
- NK Zagreb

Senior career*
Years	Team	Apps	(Gls)
2002–2003	Rudeš		
2003–2004	Olimpija Ljubljana	1	(0)
2004	Rudeš	0	(0)
2005–2008	OFK Beograd	4	(0)
2008–2009	Napredak Kruševac	1	(0)
- * Club domestic league appearances and goals

Igor Dević (born 9 March 1984 in Zagreb) is a Croatian football player.

== Club career ==
After playing in Zagreb's club NK Rudeš he moved to Slovenia where he played one season with the historical NK Olimpija Ljubljana. He ten returned to Rudeš and played with them in the 2004–05 Croatian Cup. In 2004, he moved to Serbia where he will play several seasons with OFK Beograd, and one, 2008–09 with FK Napredak Kruševac.
