= Daewoo Musiro =

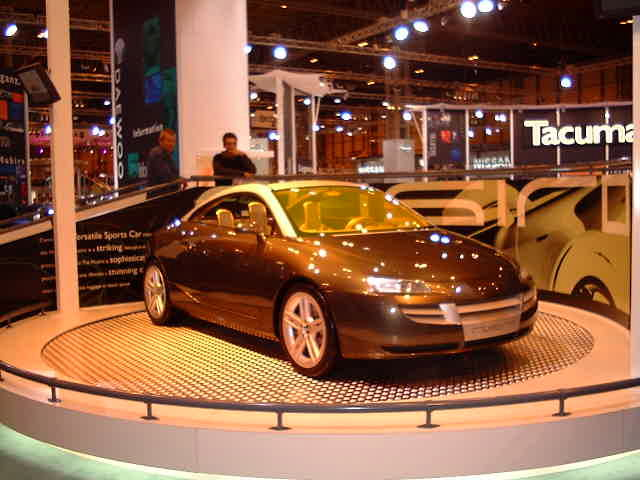
Daewoo Musiro

The Daewoo Musiro (Korean for 'Any Time [now]') was the penultimate concept vehicle to emerge from Daewoo's UK Worthing Technical Centre product development facility. Launched at the 2000 British Motor Show British International Motor Show the Musiro built on Daewoo's emerging 'Designed Around You' product mantra and was a distillation of the earlier and more advanced 1999 Mirae show car's Versatile Sports Car (VSC) concept.

== Concept ==
Unlike the Mirae, the Musiro was based on a future Daewoo underbody but still included the kind of reconfigurable interior flexibility features more normally found in MPV's making the Musiro an especially advanced and innovative vehicle. The neat exterior reminded viewers of the Audi TT but the coupe lines disguised an innovative opening roof. The traditional issues of open top cars being less stiff than closed roof cars and folding 'hardtop cars' having little boot space was solved by Worthing's Daewoo designers - the roof panel and rear window articulate themselves, using the cant rails as guides (disguising the tracks), and once vertically stacked then dropped behind the rear seats. The trunk lost retained almost all of its volume and rear passengers were not affected either, plus with impressive stiffness there was no trade-off in dynamic ability.

The interior utilised unusual translucent materials to facilitate communication between occupants and avoiding the claustrophobic sensation of most coupes. Colours owed more to the catwalk than automotive fashions of the time. The innovative seats were supported not on the floor as usual but on the outer sills and central console (a tube like element) which it was claimed allowed a significantly wider range of movement than usual. The rear seats could slide forwards from back to front to aide ingress and egress - never a coupe strong point. The front passenger seat could be partially stored under the dashboard or slide rearwards so a parent could communicate more easily with a child in the rear.

Design Team: Chris Milburn, Chief Designer, Mark Oldham, Senior Exterior Designer, Juan Jose Delhom, Exterior Designer, Paul Wraith, Senior Interior Designer, Dominique Raye, Colour and Trim Design Manager, Louise Woodward, Colour and Trim Designer

== Specifications ==
Exterior Dimensions

- Length - 4,250 mm (167.3 in)
- Width - 1,780 mm (70.1 in)
- Height - 1,340 mm (52.8 in)
- Wheelbase - 2,540 mm (100.0 in)

Performance

- Top speed - 135 mph (217 km/h)
- 0-60 acceleration - 7.9 seconds

Engine

- Daewoo XS6 in-line six cylinder 2.5-litre engine

== Reception and legacy ==
The Musiro was well received by the press and gained positive coverage. Musiro was viewed as a signal that although Daewoo was at this time struggling under financial collapse and seeking a new owner (initially Ford then later General Motors) the brand had potential. Later Worthing Technical Centre and Musiro was sold to Tom Walkinshaw of the TWR group Tom Walkinshaw Racing. It is understood the model still remains at TWR's Leafield facility (now owned by the Aguri Suzuki F1 team Super Aguri F1). Worthing Technical Centre was finally closed in 2002 after the financial collapse of the TWR group. In 2017, the Musiro concept showed up at a UK government auction, purportedly having been seized as proceeds from a drug raid.
