= Devas Club =

English youth club

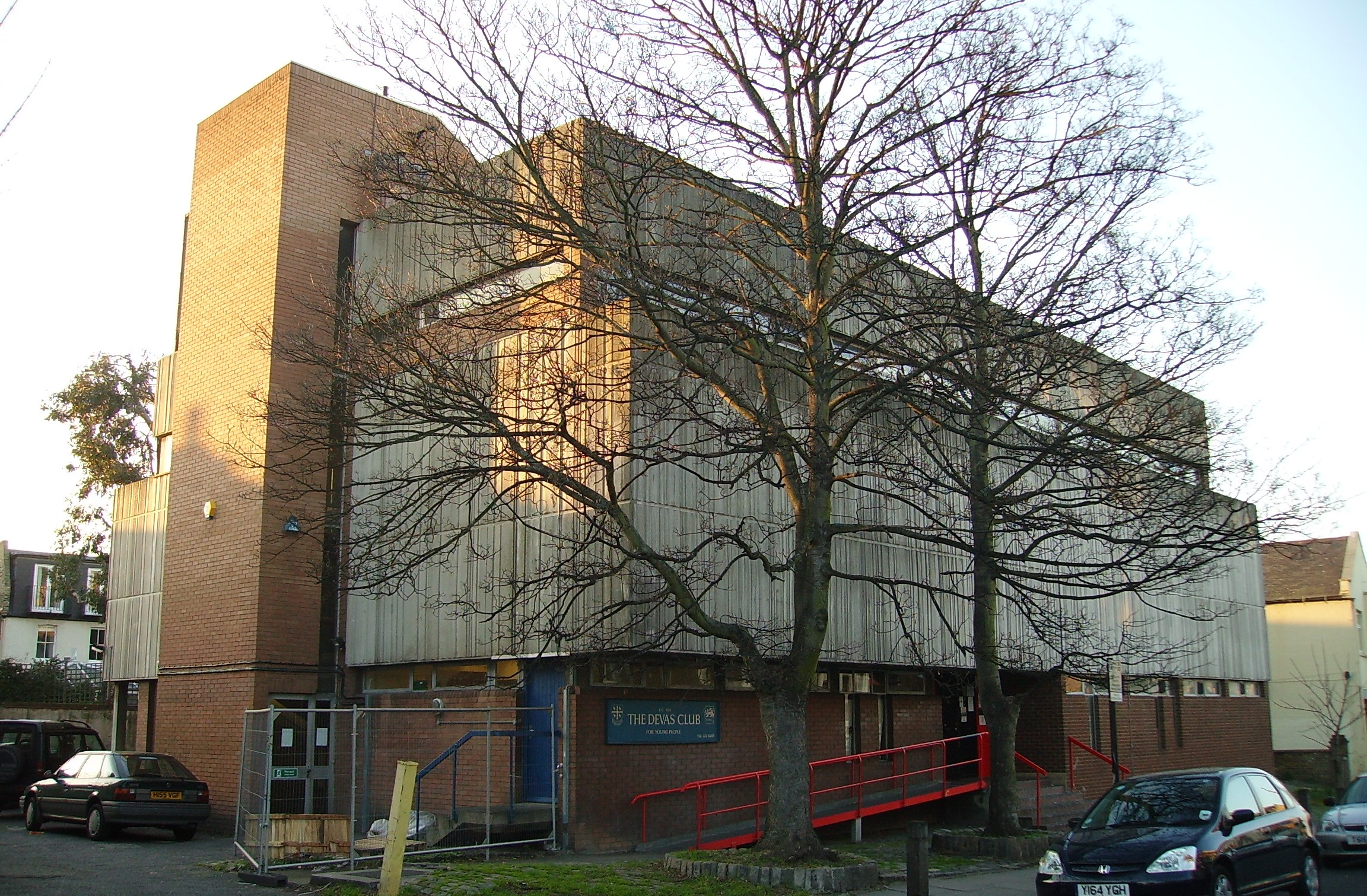
- The Devas Club premises in Stormont Road, Battersea, south London, opened in 1970
- Named after: Jocelyn Devas
- Formation: 1884
- Founder: Jocelyn Devas
- Founded at: London, England
- Type: Educational institute (1884–1970); Club (1970 onwards)
- Legal status: Open
- Purpose: Education; youth club; sports club
- Headquarters: 2a Stormont Road, Battersea
- Location: London, United Kingdom
- Coordinates: 51.46492°N 0.15648°W
- Origins: University College, Oxford
- Region served: London
- Services: Youth education, sports, activities, events
- Official language: English
- Website: devasclub.org

The Devas Club for Young People (the Devas Institute until 1970) is a youth club in Battersea, south London, England, which provides sporting, educational and creative opportunities for disadvantaged youth.

== History ==
The Devas Institute was founded by Jocelyn Devas, a student at University College, Oxford, in 1884, as a ‘Club for Working Lads’ with the aim of providing young men with job skills. The club was originally called University College House and was in a room above a coffee shop in Stewarts Road. Following Jocelyn Devas's death eighteen months after founding the club, in a climbing accident on the Matterhorn, his father offered a substantial endowment if his college friends would carry on the work in Battersea. Oxford House helped the club early in its development.

The Devas Institute was constituted first under a scheme set up by the Charities Commissioners in 1901, when University College Oxford and then Battersea Polytechnic Institute provided members of the Management Council for the Devas Institute. The institute moved to larger premises in Thessally Road in Nine Elms in 1907. During World War I, the Devas Institute site was used as an air raid shelter.

The comprehensive redevelopment of the Nine Elms area to build New Covent Garden Market prompted a further move, to a purpose-built building on Stormont Road near Lavender Hill in 1969, in a notably Brutalist architectural style. It was renamed the Devas Club in 1970. The club was reconstituted in 1974 by order of the Charity Commissioners under independent trustees.

The main purpose of the institute's work was initially educational, but as this function became increasingly taken over by the London County Council, sporting and creative activities began to take precedence in the programme. A separate club for girls was started in 1960, which was later merged with the main activity of the club. The club maintains a small meeting space for alumni of the club ('old boys').

The club celebrated its 140th anniversary in 2024.

== The club today ==
The Devas Club is primarily targeted at young people between 11 and 19, with specialist programmes targeted at the age range 8 to 11. It aims to enable young people, particularly the disaffected and at risk, to reach their full potential as responsible, talented individuals and as active participants in the community.

The building includes a gym, a recording studio (the Stormont Studios, currently being managed by On Da Beat, a platinum selling music company), performance space, cooking and computer facilities, a range of meeting and rehearsal rooms, and a basketball court on the roof. The club is a registered charity (Registration Number 1129419) with the stated purpose of "providing a youth centre for the purpose of helping and educating young persons under the age of 25 years through their physical, mental and spiritual capacities that they may grow to full maturity as individuals and members of society and that their conditions of life may be improved."

The Devas Club has maintained close links with University College, as well as with the Devas family, over the years. It has also developed a close relationship over many years with Wandsworth Council, who provide full-time youth staff to support the club's activities.

== Development projects ==
The building is now rather dated, and no longer fully appropriate for a modern youth club. It has been the subject of a bid to turn it into a modern centre for sports and the creative arts for disadvantaged youth, as well as providing enhanced facilities for local community use. The bid was supported by Wandsworth Borough Council by means of a £0.5m capital grant as well as support for design fees. It will include extensively modernising and extending the facilities, as well as upgrading the building provide a more open, flexible and welcoming layout. The exterior walls will be insulated to make the building more sustainable, and a new terrace will be introduced on the rooftop. A large and easily adaptable performance space will be created on the first floor by altering floor levels in the gym.

The club received UK Government Culture Recovery Fund in 2020 for support during the COVID pandemic. It has also aimed to reduce its energy use.

== See also ==
- London Youth
