= Devas (band) =

- Origin: Cluj Napoca, Romania
- Genres: Inspirational, ambiental
- Years active: 2010-present
- Members: Cristian Şerbănescu; Dragoş Cucoş; Ionuţ Cataramă
- Website: www.devas.ro

Devas are a Romanian music band formed in the spring of 2010 in Cluj Napoca. The band consists of Cristian Şerbănescu (violin), Dragoş Cucoş (synthesizer) and Ionuţ Cataramă (violin). Their goal is to produce "inspirational music for your soul".

They currently have only one album Androginal Symphonicity and they have performed an international tour with it.

They have been invited several times to perform on national and local TV (Prima TV, KanalD TV, Antena 1, Antena 2, TVR Iasi, MIx TV Brasov), and radio ( Radio Romania Actualitati, Radio BV, Radio Iasi). Devas are currently working with Edward Maya on some new pieces.
