= Milan Dević =

Serbian footballer

Personal information
- Full name: Milan Dević
- Date of birth: 30 May 1974 (age 52)
- Place of birth: Inđija, SFR Yugoslavia
- Height: 1.87 m (6 ft 1 1/2 in)
- Position: Goalkeeper

Team information
- Current team: Port (goalkeeping coach)

Senior career*
Years	Team	Apps	(Gls)
2000–2002	Inđija	4	(0)
2002–2005	ČSK Čelarevo	2	(0)
2005–2010	Inđija	67	(0)
- * Club domestic league appearances and goals

Milan Dević (Serbian Cyrillic: Милан Девић; born 30 May 1974) is former Serbian football goalkeeper. He last played for Serbian SuperLiga club FK Inđija. His current employment is at position of goalkeeping coach at Port F.C.
