= Daewoo Mirae =

The Daewoo Mirae was a concept car that was unveiled on April 20, 1999, at Daewoo's Seoul design studio 'Design Forum' and then again at the 1999 Seoul Motor Show. "Mirae" in Korean means "future".

Designed at Daewoo's UK Worthing Technical Centre, somewhat unusually it premiered in two forms: an exterior model, and a separate interior technology showcase model. Production was hinted to commence in 2010, but with the collapse of Daewoo Group in 2000 and the subsequent General Motors takeover, the concept car appears to be unlikely to be produced in the original form shown. Mirae was a joint funding exercise by the motor manufacturer and the UK Department of Trade and Industry, scheduled to coincide with the Queen's first state visit to Korea. The visit was organized to reinforce financial and technology links between the two countries.

== Concept ==
Daewoo claimed that the Mirae would be the world's first versatile sports car combining the flexibility to alter seat layouts from 4 seat MPV to single seater. The pedal and steering wheel would be able to move to provide left-hand, right-hand, or central driving positions.

== Technology ==
The Mirae showcased some unusual technologies. It utilized Daewoo's German engineering by former Daewoo Engineering Director and later Aston Martin head Dr. Ulrich Bez, including a 2.5L DOHC compact in-line 6-cylinder petrol engine, a unit that was able to be run upright or, in the concept design, on its side.

It would use ACTIVE (Advanced Camera Technology in Vehicle Ergonomics), a camera-based gestural in-vehicle control system, to replace conventional switchgear.

Drive-by-wire and steer-by-wire technology would replace the mechanical link between driver input and steering, acceleration, deceleration, and the transmission.

All seats would react to vehicle movement and would be individually suspended. Users would be able to alter comfort levels and the degree to which the seats tilted in cornering, in order to improve occupant comfort.

== Design ==
Under Daewoo Design Director Ginger Ostle, who also designed the Mazda Lantis, the car was designed by British duo Guy Colborne (exterior) and Paul Wraith (interior).

== See also ==
- Daewoo Musiro
