= Dev (artist) =

Dev (born 5 September 1947) is a Punjabi artist and poet based in Switzerland.

== Biography ==
Dev was born in 1947 in Jagraon, Punjab, India. When he was 5 he moved to Nairobi, where his father was working for the British Railways. He returned to India in 1964. He published his first poetry collection in 1969.

In 1979, he moved to Switzerland because he was highly influenced by Swiss artist Paul Klee. Since then he has lived in various cities in and outside Europe such as Bern, Barcelona and Buenos Aires. He currently lives in Rubigen, Bern.

== Works ==
- Vidhroh - 1969
- Doosre Kinare Di Talash
- Matlabi Mitti
- Prashan Te Parvaz
- Hun Ton Pehchan
- Shabdant

== Awards ==
- Schromani Pravesi Panjabi Sahitkar - 1992
- Sahitya Akademi award for his Punjabi poetry collection Shabant - 2001
