= Jana Gana Mana (disambiguation) =

Jana Gana Mana is the national anthem of India.

Jana Gana Mana may also refer to:

- Jana Gana Mana (hymn), also known as Bharoto Bhagyo Bidhata, the song from which the national anthem was excerpted
- Jana Gana Mana (2012 film), an Indian Marathi film starring Nandu Madhav and Chinmay Sant
- Jana Gana Mana (2022 film), an Indian Malayalam film starring Prithviraj Sukumaran and Suraj Venjaramoodu
- Jana Gana Mana (2023 film), an unfinished Indian Telugu-language military action film
- Jana Gana Mana (music video), a video released in January 2000 to mark the 50th year of the Indian republic
- Jaya Jaya Jaya Jaya Hey (film), 2022 Indian Malayalam-language film, the title referencing the last stanza of the anthem
