= Ganna Gryniva =

Ukrainian jazz singer

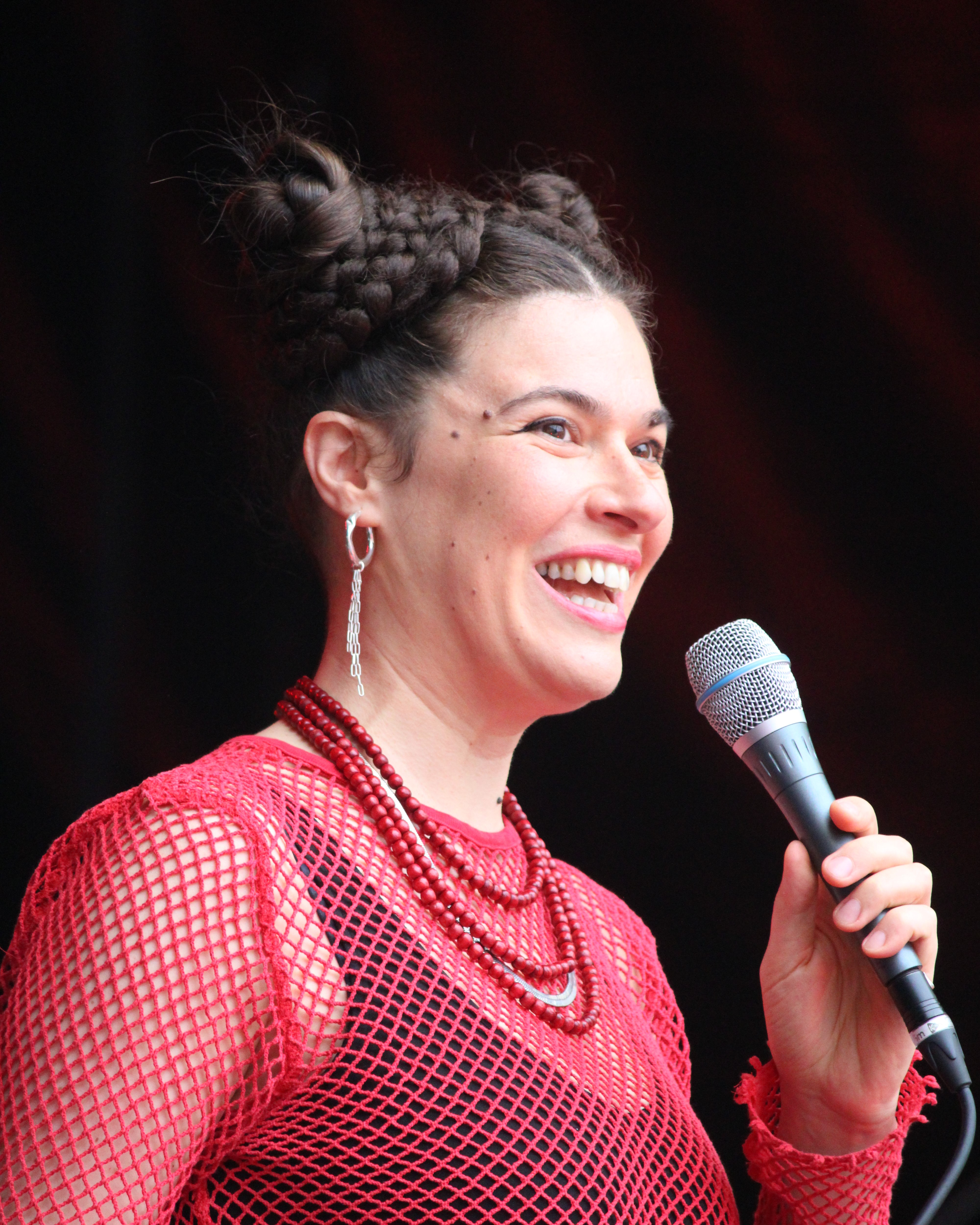
- Gryniva in 2025
- Born: 4 July 1989 (age 37)
- Education: University of Leipzig and the Franz Liszt University of Music
- Occupations: Jazz singer and composer
- Website: Ganna Gryniva

Ganna Gryniva (born 4 July 1989) is a Ukrainian jazz singer and composer working in Berlin. She was raised in Ukraine and Germany. Her songs are in English or Ukrainian.

== Life ==
Gryniva grew up in the village Vyshnyaky in the region of Kyiv, Ukraine. Her mother is a pianist and her father is a German philologist and painter. She was home schooled until she moved to Germany with her family as a 13-year-old. In Germany she attended high school in Bernburg. She graduated with a degree in philosophy from the University of Leipzig before studying singing at the Franz Liszt University of Music in Weimar in Weimar with the German singer Michael Schiefel, trumpeter Jeff Cascaro and Frank Mobus.

She tried working as a journalist, but singing had always been an ambition of hers. In 2014 she formed the Ukrainian ethnic jazz quintet GANNA Ensemble. The group's first album has a title “Dykyi Lys” that translates from Ukrainian as "Wild Fox". She wrote and arranged all of their first nine songs for their first album. Her lyrics are in English and Ukrainian and they reference other sources including the poems of Lesya Ukrainka, Nadiia Telenchuk and her father. The band received funding to travel to Ukraine as research. They have performed in Berlin, Odesa, Kyiv and all over Europe: Poland, Sweden, Hungary, Romania, Estonia, Latvia, Greece and others.

In 2017, she was invited to go to Austria to join an international ensemble led by Christopher Cech. The project known as CHAUD toured that year in Austria, Switzerland and Germany.

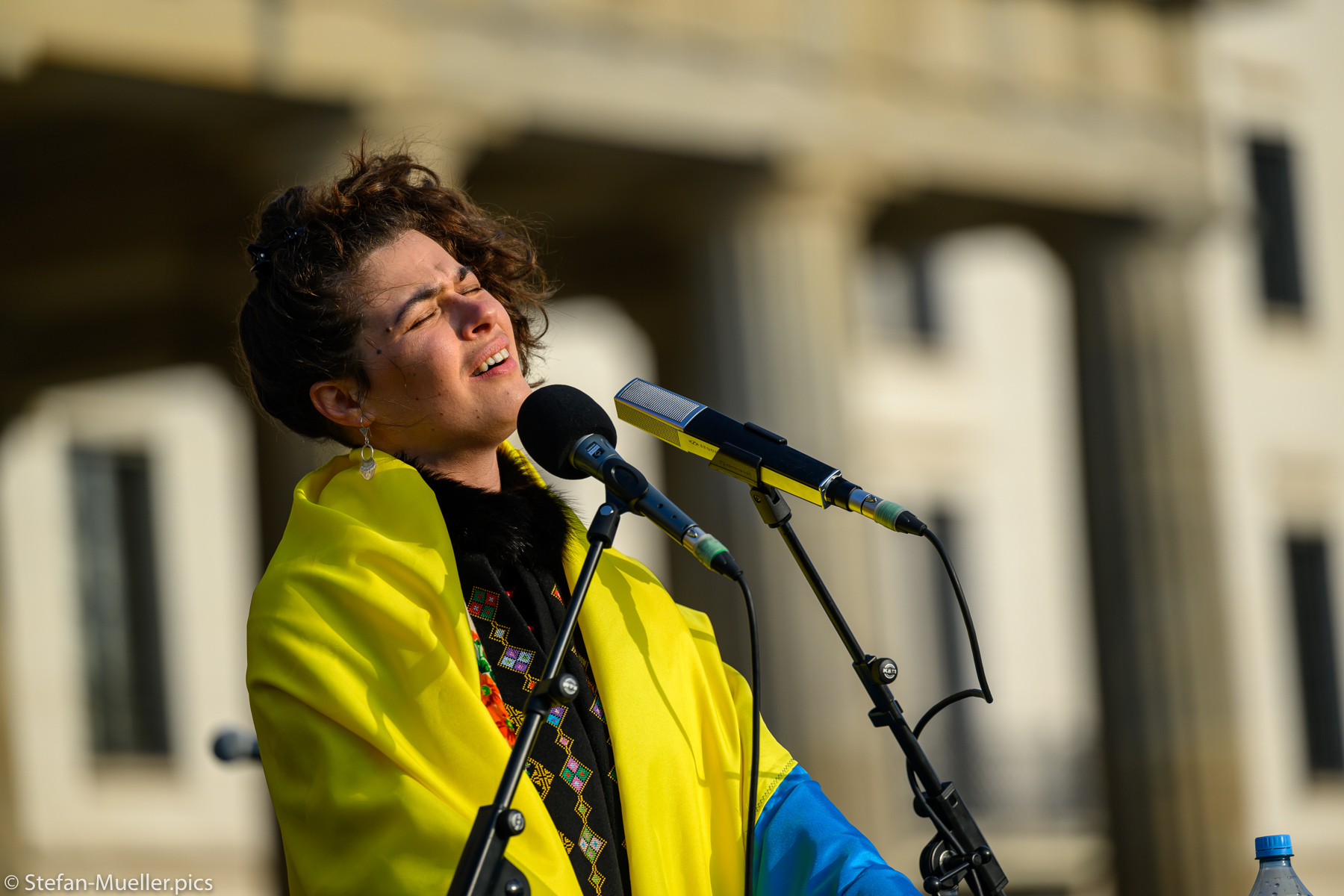
Gryniva singing for Fridays for Future in 2022

In 2022, the short film HANDBOOK by Pavel Mozhar was featured at Short Film festival in Glasgow. The film is about the 2020 Presidential election in Belarus and its soundtrack was created by Gryniva.

Gryniva was one of the leading musicians from Ukraine in Germany when Russia invaded the country in 2022. She sang at a concert "Songs of Wounding" with Mariana Sadovska in support of Ukraine on 17 March. Gryniva was one of the entertainers at the 10th Fridays for Future event in Berlin in April 2022 singing draped in a Ukrainian flag. She was one of the Jazz performers named for a "Peace on Earth" concert in Berlin organised by Wolf Kampmann to support Doctors without Borders. She was one of 70 performers who volunteered and she had her own arrangement of a folk song from Ukraine for the concert.

== Discography ==
- Nachtfarben: AIRA (Hey!jazz 2018, with Martin Bosch, Clemens Litschko, Markus Rom and Jonas Timm sowie Nastja Volokitina, DJ Illvibe)
- Ganna: Dyki Lys (Double Moon Records 2020, with Musina Ebobissé, Povel Widestrand, Tom Berkmann, Mathias Ruppnig)
- Ganna: Home (Berthold Records 2022, with Musina Ebobissé, Povel Widestrand, Tom Berkmann, Mathias Ruppnig)
- Ganna: Kupala (Berthold Records 2023, with Julian Sartorius)
