= Dęba =

Dęba may refer to the following places:

- Dęba, Opoczno County in Łódź Voivodeship (central Poland)
- Dęba, Piotrków County in Łódź Voivodeship (central Poland)
- Dęba, Lublin Voivodeship (east Poland)
- Dęba, Świętokrzyskie Voivodeship (south-central Poland)
- Dęba, Masovian Voivodeship (east-central Poland)

Nowa Dęba was known as Dęba until 1961.
