= Gunnery =

Gunnery may refer to:

- The use of guns or the study of how to apply the techniques and procedures of operating them
- The operation of artillery
- The operation of naval artillery
- The Gunnery, a coeducational prep school in Connecticut, United States

== See also ==
- Gunner (disambiguation)
