= Developer =

Developer may refer to:

== Persons or groups ==
A person or group that develops something, as in:

- Software developer
- Video game developer
- Web developer, of World Wide Web applications
- Practitioner of real estate development
- Game designer

== Other uses ==
- Apple Developer, Apple Inc. Web site
- Developer (album), by Silkworm
- Game Developer (website)
- Photographic developer, solution making exposed film visible

== See also ==
- Developer! Developer! Developer!, conferences for software developers
