= Gunna Breuning-Storm =

Danish violinist (1891–1966)

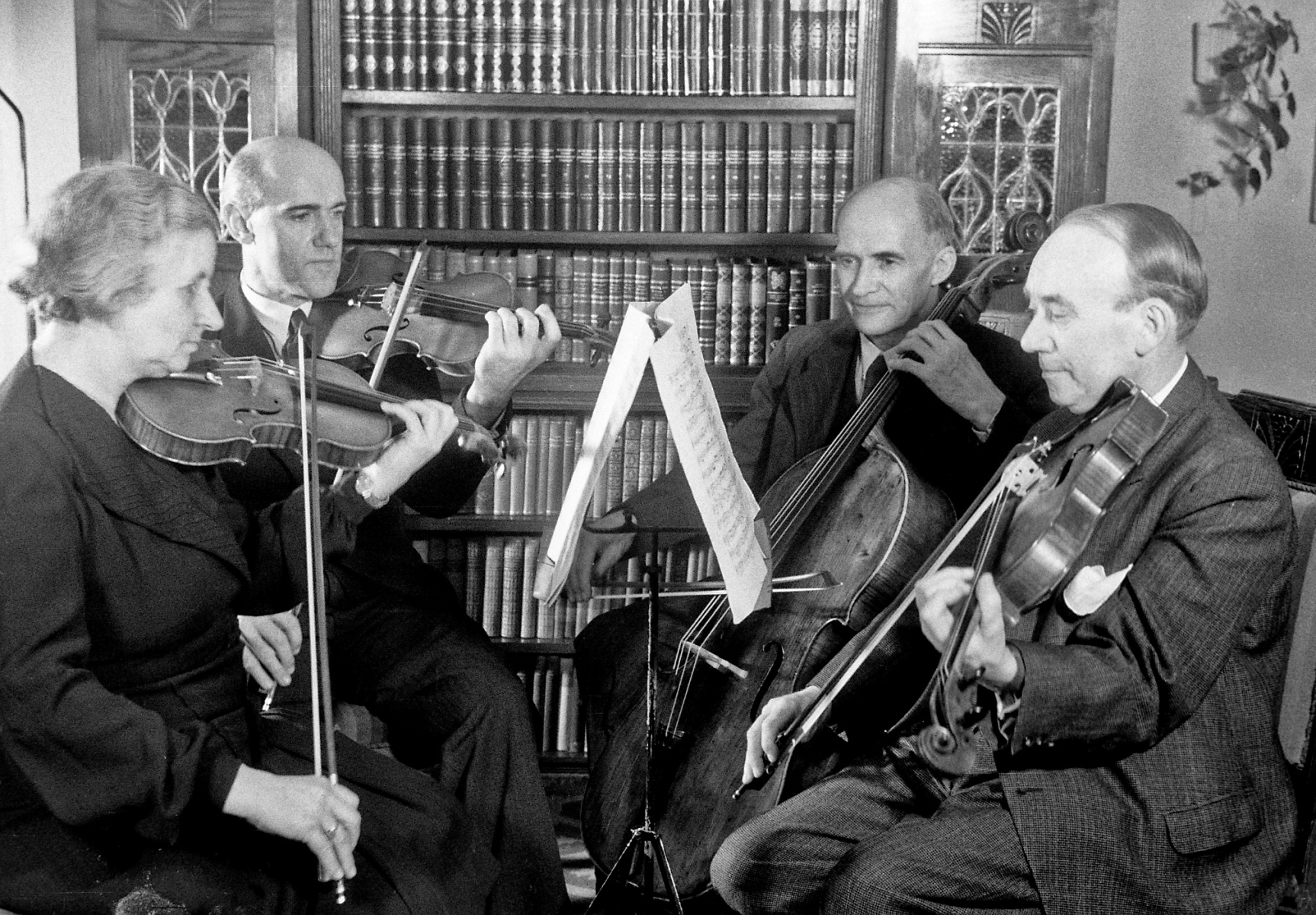
Gunna Breuning-Storm with the Breuning-Brache Quartet (1945)

Gunna Breuning-Storm (1891–1966) was a Danish violinist and music teacher. From 1910 she performed as a soloist throughout Germany until the First World War broke out in 1914. Her Breuning-Bache Quartet was active in Denmark from 1919 until 1956. In 1918, she was the first and only woman since to be appointed court violinist and the first woman to play in the Royal Danish Orchestra. From 1926, she became the conductor of the amateur Euphrosyne Orchestra for the next 20 years. She also performed widely in Sweden and England.

== Early life ==
Born in Copenhagen on 25 January 1891, Gunna Breuning-Storm was the daughter of the physician Hoter Axel Breuning-Storm (1849–1923) and Gabriele Sophie Borchorst (1863–1921). She studied the violin from an early age under Johannes Schiørring (1869–1951) and later under Torben Anton Svendsen (1904–1980), completing her education in Berlin under Henri Marteau.

== Career ==
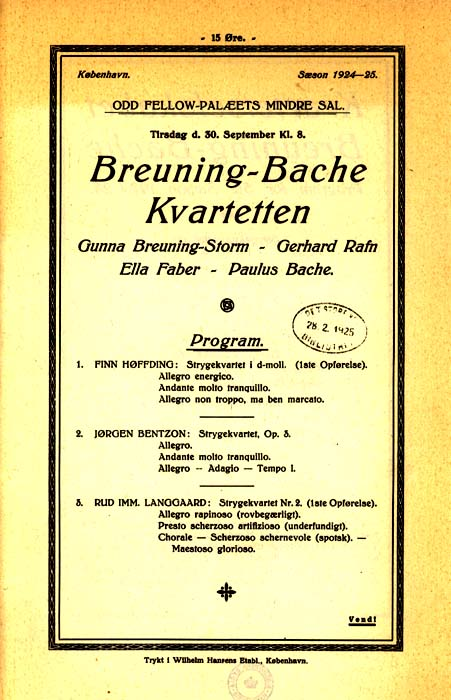
Breunung-Bache Quartet programme (1924)

She made her début in 1907 at the Odd Fellows Mansion in the presence of the king and queen. After moving to Berlin, she débuted there in 1910 and went on to perform as a soloist in Germany's main cities. She performed with the Berlin Philharmonic under Arthur Nikisch, Max Reger and Felix Weingartner and played at the court for Empress Augusta Viktoria. She also taught in Berlin, attracting a considerable number of students.

With the outbreak of war in 1914, she returned to Denmark, continuing to teach and giving concerts. She also gave a number of concerts in Sweden in 1916, including one featuring the composer Emil Sjögren with whom she played his sonatas for violin and piano. Back in Denmark, in 1918 she accompanied the court pianist Johanne Stockmarr and was appointed court violinist, becoming the only women to receive the honour. As a teacher, she was engaged by C.F.E. Horneman's conservatory and later by the Royal Danish Academy of Music (1919–1923).

Like her German instructors, she also began to conduct. In about 1920, she established her own chamber orchestra which in 1925 became the amateur Euphrosyne Orchestra. From 1926, she was the orchestra's conductor for the next 30 years, also maintaining the orchestra's educational role as a lively, enthusiastic teacher. She was supported by Crown Prince Frederik, later King Frederik IX, who sponsored a number of the orchestra's concerts. She also continued to perform as a soloist, on one occasion causing quite a stir by performing nine of the most famous violin concertos over three consecutive evenings.

Breuning-Storm is also remembered for playing first violin in the Breuning-Bache Quartet which gave its first performance in 1919 and continued to play until 1956. Outside of Denmark it was known as the Copenhagen Quartet. Initially, its members included Gerhard Rafn, second violin, Ella Faber, violist, and Paulus Brache, cello. It gained a considerable reputation both in Denmark and abroad playing both classical and modern music.

Gunna Breuning-Storm died in Copenhagen on 24 April 1966. She is buried in Bispebjerg Cemetery.

== Awards ==
She was honoured with the Ingenio et arti award in 1935.
