= Deva (footballer) =

Brazilian footballer (born 1981)

Personal information
- Full name: Delvanita Santos Souza
- Date of birth: 16 April 1981 (age 45)
- Position: Midfielder

Senior career*
Years	Team	Apps	(Gls)
- Lusa Sant'Anna

International career^{‡}
- Brazil
- * Club domestic league appearances and goals ‡ National team caps and goals as of 19 June 1999 (before the 1999 FIFA Women's World Cup)

Delvanita Santos Souza (born 16 April 1981), commonly known as Deva, is a Brazilian women's international footballer who plays as a midfielder. She is a member of the Brazil women's national football team. She was part of the team at the 1999 FIFA Women's World Cup. On club level she plays for Lusa Sant'Anna in Brazil.
