= Дeva =

- Born: Dorina Takács; 2000 (age 25–26)
- Genres: electro-folk
- Occupation: singer-songwriter
- Years active: 2019–present
- Label: Move Gently Records

Дeva (Deva), born Dorina Takács (b. 2000) is a Hungarian singer-songwriter, winner of the 2022 Music Moves Europe Award.

== Life and career ==
Dorina Takács writes and performs electronic music inspired by Hungarian folk music. In her childhood, she participated in a choir and performed folk dances. She attended an elementary school specialised in music. During secondary school, she was mostly interested in electronic music, techno and ambient styles but she thought they lacked deep emotions. She was heavily influenced by alt-J, Nils Frahm, the Weval, Four Tet, the Tame Impala, as well as Zoltán Kodály. In 2016, she was introduced to Balázs Zságer of Žagar, and she started assisting the band with handling administrative tasks. When Zságer founded Move Gently Records, she joined the company. She writes her songs in her own home studio.

Takács attended Eötvös Loránd University, majoring in music culture and religious studies, but postponed her studies due to her music career.

She first wanted to have Veda as her stage name, but she did not feel confident to use something that means "knowledge", thus she chose deva. Later on she realised the word has several meanings in different languages.

Her first studio album, titled Csillag ("Star") was released on 20 January 2022. Music magazine Recorder noted that "Dorina Takács simply sings in a very beautiful way, often in parts, like a choir. [...] bravely abandoning the more obvious 'hit'-ness of her earlier songs, she builds an arc throughout the album, with an impressive but not contrived dramaturgy."

== Discography ==
Studio albums

- Avar (2025)
- Csillag (2022)

== Awards ==
- 2026 Fonogram award: electronic musical album of the year (Avar)
- 2022 Petőfi Music Award, Female Performer of the Year
- 2022 Music Moves Europe Award
