= 1987 in association football =

The following are the football (soccer) events of the year 1987 throughout the world.

== Events ==
- UEFA Champions League: Porto 2–1 Bayern Munich in the final at the Ernst Happel Stadium in Vienna.
- UEFA Cup: Two legs; 1st leg, IFK Göteborg 1–0 Dundee United; 2nd leg, Dundee United 1–1 IFK Göteborg. IFK Göteborg wins 2–1 on aggregate.
- Cup Winners' Cup: Ajax 1–0 Lokomotive Leipzig
- Super Cup: Two legs; 1st leg, Ajax 0–1 Porto; 2nd leg, Porto 1–0 Ajax. Porto won 2–0 on aggregate
- England - FA Cup: Coventry won 3-2 (aet) over Tottenham Hotspur
- Copa Libertadores: Won by Peñarol after defeating América de Cali on the final playoff match by a score of 1–0.
- 25 July – In second ever FIFA U16 World Championship, the Soviet Union beat the surprise winners of two years ago, Nigeria, on penalties.
- 13 December – Portugal's Porto wins the Intercontinental Cup in Tokyo, Japan by defeating Uruguay's Peñarol in extra-time by a score of 2–1. The winning goal is scored by Rabah Madjer.

== Winner club national championships ==
=== Asia ===
- Qatar – Al-Sadd

=== Europe ===
- England – Everton
- France – Bordeaux
- Italy – Napoli
- Netherlands – PSV
- Portugal – Benfica
- Scotland – Rangers
- Spain – Real Madrid
- Turkey – Galatasaray
- West Germany – Bayern Munich

=== North America ===
- Canada – Calgary Kickers (CSL)
- Mexico – Chivas Guadalajara
- United States – San Diego Nomads (WSA)

=== South America ===
- Argentina:
  - Primera División – Rosario Central
- Bolivia:
  - Liga de Fútbol Profesional Boliviano – Bolívar
- Chile:
  - Primera División de Chile – Universidad Católica
- Colombia:
  - Fútbol Profesional Colombiano – Millonarios
- Brazil:
  - Brazilian Football Confederation – Sport Recife
  - Copa União – Flamengo
- Paraguay:
  - Liga Paraguaya – Cerro Porteño

== International Tournaments ==
- Copa América in Argentina (27 June – 12 July 1987)
  1. Uruguay
  2. Chile
  3. Colombia
- Pan American Games in Indianapolis, United States (9–21 August 1987)
  1. Brazil
  2. Chile
  3. Argentina

== Births ==
- January 1
  - Abdullah Eisa, Emirati footballer
  - Gasan Gasanov, former Russian professional footballer
  - Saad Hosny, Egyptian footballer
- January 2 – Dejan Marijanovič, Slovenian footballer
- January 3 – Damien Moulin, French professional footballer
- January 4
  - Kay Voser, Swiss footballer
  - Danny Simpson, English footballer
- January 7 – Jimmy Smith, English footballer
- January 10 – Vicente Guaita, Spanish footballer
- January 12 – Andrey Buyvolov, Russian footballer
- January 21
  - Andrei Cojocari, Moldovan international
  - Alexander Dercho, German club footballer
  - Henrico Drost, Dutch youth international
  - Will Johnson, Canadian international
  - Kevin Kratz, German club footballer
  - Mulopo Kudimbana, Congolese international
  - Danny Munyao, Zambian international
  - Nyasha Mushekwi, Zimbabwean international
- January 24 — Wayne Hennessey, Welsh international footballer
- January 25 — Adam Berner, Swedish former footballer
- January 26 — Hérick (Hérick Samora da Silva), Brazilian footballer
- January 28 — Iván Emmanuel González, Paraguayan footballer
- February 1 – William España, Ecuadorian footballer
- February 3 – Javi Barranco, Spanish footballer
- February 6 – Tommy De Jong, French-Dutch professional footballer
- February 14
  - Edinson Cavani, Uruguayan footballer
  - José Miguel Cubero, Costa Rican footballer
- February 20 – Jenimy, São Toméan footballer
- February 21 – Eniola Aluko, Nigerian-born British football player and manager
- February 23 – Scott Davies, English footballer
- February 26 – Klevis Gjoni, Albanian footballer
- February 27
  - Maximiliano Moralez, Argentinian footballer
  - Sandy Paillot, French footballer
  - Javi Salero, Spanish footballer
- March 10 – Rolando Barra, Bolivian footballer
- March 12 – Omar Abdulrazaq, Syria footballer
- March 13 – Andreas Beck, German international footballer
- March 17 – Adrian Sager, Swiss professional footballer
- March 19 – Jairo Talledo, Peruvian footballer
- March 20
- March 31
  - Nordin Amrabat, Dutch footballer
  - Hugo Ayala, Mexican footballer
  - Amaury Bischoff, Portuguese footballer
  - Kåre Björkstrand, Finnish footballer
  - Justin Braun, American soccer player
  - Carl Dickinson, English footballer
  - Eros Pisano, Italian footballer
  - Aridane Santana, Spanish footballer
- April 2 – Kim Kintziger, Luxembourgish international footballer
- April 4 – Fumaça (Jonatha Alves da Silva), Brazilian former footballer
- April 9 – Blaise Matuidi, French international footballer
- April 15 – Giorgio Conrotto, Italian footballer
- April 16 — Aaron Lennon, English international footballer
- April 22 — Mikel John Obi, Nigerian international footballer
- April 23 — Francesco Montella, Italian footballer
- May 4 — Cesc Fàbregas, Spanish international footballer
- May 11 — Henrique (Henrique Neris de Brito), Brazilian footballer
- May 12 — Nargiz Pashayeva, Azerbaijani former footballer
- May 22 — Arturo Vidal, Chilean international footballer
- May 24 — Anzhela Temirova, Azerbaijani former footballer
- June 12 — Antonio Barragán, Spanish and Galician footballer
- June 24
  - Serdar Güneş, Turkish footballer
  - Craig Henderson, New Zealand footballer
  - Josh Lillis, English footballer
  - Lionel Messi, Argentine international footballer
- June 26 — Samir Nasri, French international footballer
- July 2 — Esteban Granero, Spanish footballer
- July 3 — Oscar Magaña, Chilean footballer
- July 6 — Mubarak Al Beloushi, Kuwaiti footballer
- July 20 — Michael Cavallaro, Australian Italian footballer
- July 23 — Rene Carter, Caymanian footballer
- July 25 — Eran Zahavi, Israeli footballer
- July 27 — Vasili Penyasov, former Russian professional football player
- July 28
  - Yasser Corona, Mexican defender
  - Yevhen Khacheridi, Ukrainian international
  - Pedro, Spanish footballer
- July 31 – Marco André, Portuguese footballer
- August 19 – Richard Stearman, English footballer
- August 22 – Tomasz Ostalczyk, Polish footballer
- August 24
  - Jonathan Ruttens, Belgian retired footballer
  - Nicola Segato, Italian footballer
  - Masaki Yamamoto, Japanese football player
  - Ri Jun-il, North Korean football player
- August 30 — Hamza Testouri, Tunisian football footballer
- September 2 — Nazar Penkovets, professional Ukrainian footballer
- September 9 — Abel Dhaira, Ugandan international footballer (died 2016)
- September 14 — Emrah Tuncel, Turkish footballer
- September 15 — Odai Amr, Saudi footballer
- September 21 — Marvin Ellmann, German footballer
- September 22 — David Ledy, retired French footballer
- September 25 — Osman Mohammed, Sudanese footballer
- September 27 — Erdene-Ochiriin Ganzorig, Mongolian international footballer
- September 30 — Rubén Royo, Spanish former footballer
- October 1 — Lionel Ainsworth, English footballer
- October 7 — James McArthur, Scottish international footballer
- October 9 — Ján Nemček, Slovak footballer
- October 11 — Timo Furuholm, Finnish international footballer
- November 5 — Vicente Flor, Spanish footballer
- November 13 — Patrick Niklas, Austrian footballer
- November 21 — Gunnar Haraldsen, Faroese former footballer
- November 27 — David Terkpertey, Ghanaian footballer
- December 2 – Isaac Promise, Nigerian international (d. 2019)
- December 3 – Justo Nguema, Equatorial Guinean football manager and former footballer
- December 5 – Tommy Fraser, English club footballer
- December 9
  - Adriano, Brazilian footballer
  - Karim Benzema, French international footballer
- December 18 – Konstantin Lozbinev, Russian former professional footballer
- December 25 – Saoud Qern, Saudi midfielder
- December 27 – Pako Lekgari, Botswana international footballer

== Deaths ==
=== February ===
- February 2 – Carlos José Castilho, Brazilian goalkeeper, winner of the 1958 FIFA World Cup and 1962 FIFA World Cup. (59)

=== May ===
- May - Syd Hartley, English professional association football player (born 1914)
- May 23 - Ernst Nagelschmitz, German footballer (born 1902)

=== October ===
- October 23 – Alejandro Scopelli, Argentine/Italian striker, runner-up of the 1930 FIFA World Cup. (79)

=== November ===
- November 23 – Antonio Sastre, Argentine footballer. (76)
