= Gunnar =

Male given name

Gunnar is a male first name of Nordic origin (Gunnarr in Old Norse). Gunder is a variant,. Notable people with the name Gunnar include:

- Gunnar Andersen (1890–1968), Norwegian footballer and ski jumper
- Gunnar Andersen (cyclist) (1911–1981), Danish cyclist
- Gunnar Andersen (ski jumper) (1909–1988), Norwegian ski jumper
- Gunnar Aagaard Andersen (1919–1982), Danish sculptor, painter and designer
- Gunnar Andersson (aviator) (1923–1974), Swedish aviator
- Gunnar Andersson (footballer) (1928-1969), Swedish footballer
- Gunnar Andersson (politician) (1896–1956), Finnish politician
- Gunnar Andersson (trade unionist) (1890–1946), Swedish trade unionist
- Gunnar Asplund (1885–1940), Swedish architect
- Gunnar Back (1906-1973): American radio and TV anchor
- Gunnar Bärlund (1911–1982), Finnish boxer
- Gunnar Berg (composer) (1909–1989), Danish composer
- Gunnar Berg (painter) (1863–1893), Norwegian painter
- Gunnar Berg (politician) (1923–2007), Norwegian politician
- Gunnar Berg (Scouting) (1896–1987), American scouting leader
- Gunnar Berg Lampe (1892–1978), Norwegian tourist industry manager
- Gunnar Andreas Berg (born 1954), Norwegian musician
- Gunnar Bengtsson (1909–1993), Swedish mass murderer
- Gunnar Berge (born 1940), Norwegian politician
- Gunnar Berggren (1908–1983), Swedish boxer
- Gunnar Bergh (1909–1986), Swedish discus thrower and shot putter
- Gunnar Bergstrand, Norwegian handball player
- Gunnar Bergström (1915–1968), Swedish footballer
- Gunnar Berndtson (1854–1895), Finnish painter
- Gunnar Berntsen (born 1977), German footballer
- Gunnar Bigum (1914–1983), Danish actor
- Gunnar Biörck (1916–1996), Swedish politician
- Gunnar Birgisson (1947–2021), Icelandic politician
- Gunnar Birkerts (1925–2017), American architect
- Gunnar Björk (1891–1980), Swedish cyclist
- Gunnar Björling (1887–1960), Finnish poet
- Gunnar Björnstrand (1909–1986), Swedish actor
- Gunnar Bjurner (1882–1964), Swedish Navy officer
- Gunnar Blix (1894–1981), Swedish chemist
- Gunnar Blomström, Swedish footballer
- Gunnar Bøe (1917–1989), Norwegian economist and politician
- Gunnar Bondevik (1902–1987), Norwegian priest
- Gunnar Böös (1894–1987), Swedish fencer
- Gunnar Bovim (born 1960), Norwegian physician and civil servant
- Gunnar Brands (born 1956), German classical archaeologist
- Gunnar Bråthen (1896–1980), Norwegian trade unionist and politician
- Gunnar Bratlie (1918–1990), Norwegian illustrator
- Gunnar Breimo (1939–2024), Norwegian politician
- Gunnar Breivik (born 1943), Norwegian sociologist
- Gunnar Broberg (1942–2022), Swedish academic
- Gunnar Broberg (sailor) (1944–2023), Swedish sailor
- Gunnar Brøvig (1924–1965), Norwegian politician
- Gunnar Christian Brøvig (1907–1944), Norwegian ship owner
- Gunnar Brunvoll (1924–1999), Norwegian impresario and opera administrator
- Gunnar Bucht (born 1927), Swedish composer and musicologist
- Gunnar Carlsson (born 1952), Mathematician
- Gunnar Caspersen (1932–2000), Norwegian trade unionist
- Gunnar Cederschiöld (1887–1949), Swedish fencer
- Gunnar Christensen (1913–1986), Danish sprinter and hammer thrower
- Gunnar Christensen (footballer) (1905–1988), Norwegian footballer
- Gunnar Dahl-Olsen (born 1965), Faroese cyclist
- Gunnar Dahl (1900–1940), Norwegian footballer
- Gunnar Dahlberg (1893–1956), Swedish physician
- Gunnar Dahlen (1918–2004), Norwegian footballer
- Gunnar Dahlgaard (born 1941), Danish sailor
- Gunnar Danbolt (born 1940), Norwegian art historian
- Gunnar Dedio (born 1969), German film producer and author
- Gunnar Degelius (1903–1993), Swedish lichenologist
- Gunnar Domeij (born 1976), Swedish former goalkeeper in floorball
- Gunnar Dryselius (1907–1982), Swedish diplomat
- Gunnar Dybwad (1909–2001), American professor, disability rights advocate
- Gunnar Dybwad (footballer) (1928–2012), Norwegian footballer
- Gunnar Dyrberg (1921–2012), Danish resistance member
- Gunnar Eggen (1946–2024), Norwegian harness racer
- Gunnar Eide (1920–2012), Norwegian actor and singer
- Gunnar Eide (footballer) (1923–1994), Norwegian footballer
- Gunnar Eilifsen (1897–1943), Norwegian police officer
- Gunnar Einarsson (born 1976), Icelandic footballer and manager
- Gunnar Ekelöf (1907–1968), Swedish poet and writer
- Gunnar Eklund (1920–2010), Swedish military officer
- Gunnar Ekman (born 1943), Swedish middle-distance runner
- Gunnar Ekstrand (1892–1966), Swedish diver
- Gunnar Eliassen (1907–1971), Norwegian athlete and wrestler
- Gunnar Ellefsen (1930–1997), Norwegian politician
- Gunnar Engedahl (1919–1969), Norwegian singer
- Gunnar Erdtman (1897–1973), Swedish botanist
- Gunnar Ericsson (1919–2013), Swedish businessman, sports official, politician
- Gunnar Eriksson (1921–1982), Swedish cross-country skier
- Boomer Esiason (born 1961), American football player and commentator
- Gunnar Eyjólfsson (1926–2016), Icelandic actor
- Gunnar Fant (1919–2009), Swedish engineer and linguist
- Gunnar Fatland (born 1946), Norwegian politician
- Gunnar Felixson (born 1940), Icelandic footballer
- Gunnar Ficker (born 1954), Brazilian sailor
- Gunnar Finne (1886–1952), Finnish sculptor
- Gunnar Fischer (1910–2011), Swedish cinematographer
- Gunnar Flikke (born 1947), Norwegian newspaper editor
- Gunnar Fløystad (1902–1977), Norwegian politician
- Gunnar Fosseng (born 1967), Norwegian handball goalkeeper
- Gunnar Fougner (1911–1995), Norwegian architect
- Gunnar Fredriksen (1907–1994), Norwegian decathlete
- Gunnar Friberg, Swedish bandy player
- Gunnar Friedemann (1909–1944), Estonian chess player
- Gunnar de Frumerie (1908–1987), Swedish composer and pianist
- Gunnar Gabrielsson (1891–1981), Swedish sport shooter
- Gunnar Galin (1902–1997), Swedish sportsperson
- Gunnar Garbo (1924–2016), Norwegian politician
- Gunnar Garfors (born 1975), Norwegian traveller and author
- Gunnar Garpö (1919–1976), Swedish bobsledder
- Gunnar Gehl (born 2001), American singer-songwriter
- Gunnar Geisse (born 1964), German musician
- Gunnar Germeten (1918–1995), Norwegian civil servant
- Gunnar Gerring (1916–2009), Swedish diplomat
- Gunnar Gíslason (born 1961), Icelandic footballer
- Gunnar Gíslason (businessman), Icelandic businessman
- Gunnar Hauk Gjengset (born 1946), Norwegian philologist and author
- Gunnar Göransson (1933–2012), Swedish cyclist
- Gunnar Graarud (1886–1960), Norwegian operatic tenor
- Gunnar Gran (1931–2016), Norwegian media executive
- Gunnar Grandin (1918–2004), Swedish Navy officer
- Gunnar Grantz (1885–1941), Norwegian rower
- Gunnar Graps (1951–2004), Estonian musician
- Gunnar Gravdahl (1927–2015), Norwegian politician
- Gunnar Gren (1920–1991), Swedish footballer
- Gunnar Grendstad (born 1960), Norwegian political scientist
- Gunnar Greve (born 1982), Musical artist
- Gunnar Grönblom (1895–1939), Finnish sailor
- Gunnar Már Guðmundsson (born 1983), Icelandic footballer
- Gunnar Gundersen (chess player) (1882–1943), Australian chess player
- Gunnar Gundersen (politician) (born 1956), Norwegian politician and swimmer
- Gunnar Bull Gundersen (1929–1993), Norwegian sailor, novelist, playwright and lyricist
- Gunnar Edvard Gundersen (1927–2017), Norwegian economist, politician, and organizational leader
- Gunnar S. Gundersen (1921–1983), Norwegian artist
- Gunnar Gunnarson (1918–2002), Swedish academic
- Gunnar Gunnarsson (1889–1975), Icelandic author
- Gunnar Gunnarsson (footballer) (born 1933), Icelandic footballer
- Gunnar Gunnarsson (handballer) (born 1961), Icelandic handball player
- Gunnar Kristinn Gunnarsson (born 1933), Icelandic chess player
- Gunnar Þór Gunnarsson (born 1985), Icelandic footballer
- Gunnar Haarberg (1917–2009), Norwegian philologist and television host
- Gunnar Haarstad (1916–1992), Norwegian jurist and police officer
- Gunnar Hagemann (1877–1971), Danish philatelist
- Gunnar Hagen (1904–1969), Norwegian decathlete
- Gunnar Odd Hagen (1921–1997), Norwegian politician
- Gunnar Hägg (1903–1986), Swedish chemist and crystallographer
- Gunnar Hägglöf (1904–1994), Swedish diplomat
- Gunnar Håkansson (1926–2009), Swedish Greco-Roman wrestler
- Gunnar Hallberg (born 1945), English bridge player
- Gunnar Halle (born 1965), Norwegian footballer and manager
- Gunnar Halle (officer) (1907–1986), Norwegian engineer and military officer
- Gunnar Hallkvist (1919–2014), Swedish speed skater
- Gunnar Hallström (1910–1989), Swedish trade unionist and politician
- Gunnar Halvorsen (1945–2006), Norwegian politician
- Gunnar Hámundarson, Icelandic chieftain and poet
- Gunnar Handal (born 1936), Norwegian educationalist
- Gunnar Hansen (1947–2015), American actor and author
- Gunnar Hansen (boxer) (1916–2004), Norwegian boxer
- Gunnar Hansen (footballer) (1923–2005), Norwegian footballer
- Gunnar D. Hansson (born 1945), Swedish writer and translator
- Gunnar Haraldsen (born 1987), Faroese footballer
- Gunnar Harding (born 1940), Swedish poet, novelist, essayist and translator
- Gunnar Harling (1920–2010), Swedish botanist
- Gunnar Haugan (1925–2009), Norwegian actor
- Gunnar Heckscher (1909–1987), Swedish political scientist
- Robert Hedin (born 1966), Swedish handball player and coach
- Gunnar Hedlund (1900–1989), Swedish politician
- Gunnar Heiberg (1857–1929), Norwegian poet, playwright, journalist and theatre critic
- Gunnar von Heijne (born 1951), Swedish scientist
- Gunnar Heinsohn (1943–2023), German author, sociologist and economist
- Gunnar Helén (1918–2002), Swedish politician, journalist and civil servant
- Gunnar Gunnarsson Helland (1889–1976), Norwegian-American Hardanger fiddle maker
- Gunnar Olavsson Helland (1852–1938), Norwegian Hardanger fiddle maker
- Gunnar Fredrik Hellesen (1913–2005), Norwegian politician
- Gunnar Hellström (1928–2001), Swedish actor
- Gunnar Helm (born 2002), American football player
- Gunnar Henderson (born 2001), American baseball player
- Gunnar Henningsmoen (1919–1996), Norwegian palaeontologist
- Gunnar Henningsson (1895–1960), Swedish poet, idealist and teacher
- Gunnar Henriksson (1905–1974), Finnish journalist and politician
- Gunnar von Hertzen (1893–1973), Finnish Jaeger officer and physician
- Gunnar Hjeltnes (1922–2013), Norwegian alpine skier
- Gunnar Höckert (1910–1940), Finnish runner
- Gunnar Hoffsten (1923–2010), Musical artist
- Gunnar Hoglund (born 1999), American baseball player
- Gunnar Höglund (1923–1984), Swedish actor
- Gunnar von Hohenthal (1880–1966), Finnish modern pentathlete
- Gunnar Höjer (1875–1936), Swedish artistic gymnast
- Gunnar Hökmark (born 1952), Swedish politician
- Gunnar Holmberg (1897–1975), Swedish footballer
- Gunnar Holmgren (born 1999), Canadian cyclist
- Gunnar Hoppe (1914–2005), Swedish geographer and Quaternary geologist
- Gunnar Horn (1894–1946), Norwegian petroleum geologist and Arctic explorer
- Gunnar Høst (1900–1983), Norwegian philologist and literary historian
- Gunnar Høverstad (1922–1943), world war 2 Norwegian bomber pilot rank
- Gunnar Hultgren (1902–1991), Swedish archbishop
- Gunnar Huseby (1923–1995), Icelandic track and field athlete
- Gunnar Hvarnes (born 1977), Norwegian chef
- Gunnar Thorleif Hvashovd (1924–2001), Norwegian politician
- Gunnar Olof Hyltén-Cavallius (1818–1889), Swedish cultural historian
- Gunnar Hynne (born 1953), Norwegian politician
- Gunnar Ingelman (born 1952), Swedish theoretical physicist (b. 1952)
- Gunnar Isachsen (1868–1939), Norwegian military officer
- Gunnar Jackson (born 1986), New Zealand boxer
- Gunnar Jacobson (born 1948), Swedish modern pentathlete
- Gunnar Jahn (1883–1971), Norwegian politician
- Gunnar Jahr (1884–1968), Norwegian politician
- Gunnar Jakobsen (1916–1992), Norwegian banker and politician
- Gunnar Jakobsson (1900–1959), Finnish figure skater
- Gunnar Jamvold (1896–1984), Norwegian sailor
- Gunnar Janson (1901–1983), Norwegian sculptor
- Gunnar Jansson (athlete) (1897–1953), Swedish hammer thrower
- Gunnar Jansson (footballer) (1907–1998), Swedish footballer
- Gunnar Jarring (1907–2002), Swedish diplomat and Turkologist
- Gunnar Jeannette (born 1982), American racing driver
- Gunnar Jedeur-Palmgren (1899–1996), Swedish Navy officer
- Gunnar Jensen (1863–1948), Danish sculptor
- Gunnar Jervill (born 1945), Swedish archer
- Magnus Johannesson (born 1964), Swedish economist
- Gunnar Johannsen (born 1940), German cyberneticist
- Gunnar Johansen (1906–1991), Danish-born pianist and composer (1906 - 1991)
- Gottfrid Johansson (1891–1962), Swedish footballer
- Gunnar Johansson (canoeist) (1919–1998), Swedish canoeist
- Gunnar Johansson (composer) (1906–1991), Swedish composer
- Gunnar Johansson (diver) (1924–1997), Swedish diver
- Gunnar Johansson (footballer) (1924–2003), Swedish footballer and manager
- Gunnar Johansson (immunologist) (born 1938), Swedish immunologist
- Gunnar Johansson (psychophysicist) (1911–1998), Swedish psychophysicist
- Gunnar Johansson (water polo) (born 1957), Swedish water polo player
- Gunnar Kaasen (1882–1960), Norwegian-American dog musher
- Gunnar Kaiser (1976–2023), German writer
- Gunnar Kangro (1913–1975), Estonian mathematician
- Gunnar Karlsson (1939–2019), Icelandic historian
- Gunnar Klettenberg (born 1967), Estonian equestrian
- Gunnar Knudsen (1848–1928), Norwegian politician
- Gunnar Korhonen (1918–2001), Norwegian politician
- Gunnar Berg Lampe (1892–1978), Norwegian businessman
- Gunnar Larsen (politician) (1902–1973), Danish engineer and politician
- Gunnar Larsen (writer) (1900–1958), Norwegian writer
- Gunnar Larsson (cross-country skier) (born 1944), Swedish cross-country skier
- Gunnar Larsson (politician) (1908–1996), Swedish politician
- Gunnar Larsson (sports administrator) (1940–2020), Swedish sports manager and politician
- Gunnar Larsson (swimmer) (born 1951), Swedish swimmer
- Gunnar Malmquist (1893–1982), Swedish astronomer
- Gunnar Marklund (1892–1964), Finnish botanist
- Pål Gunnar Mikkelsplass (born 1961), Norwegian cross-country skier
- Gunnar Möller (1928–2017), German actor
- Gunnar Molton (born 1993), drummer for Texas Hippie Coalition
- Gunnar Myrdal (1898–1987), Swedish economist
- Gunnar Nelson (musician) (born 1967), American musician
- Gunnar Nelson (fighter) (born 1988), Icelandic martial arts fighter
- Gunnar Nielsen (actor) (1919–2009), Swedish actor
- Gunnar Nielsen (Argentine footballer) (born 1983), Argentine footballer
- Gunnar Nielsen (athlete) (1928–1985), Danish middle-distance runner
- Gunnar Nielsen (Faroese footballer) (born 1986), Faroese footballer
- Gunnar Nilson (1872–1951), Swedish physician
- Gunnar Nilsson (1948–1978), Swedish racing driver
- Gunnar Nilsson (boxer) (1923–2005), Swedish boxer
- Gunnar Nilsson (trade unionist) (1922–1997), Swedish trade unionist
- Gunnar Nordahl (1921–1995), Swedish football player
- Gunnar Nordström (1881–1923), Finnish physicist
- Gunnar Öquist (born 1941), Swedish biologist
- Gunnar Persson (1933–2018), Swedish cartoonist
- Gunnar Randers (1914–1992), Norwegian physicist
- Gunnar Reuterskiöld (1893–1970), Swedish diplomat
- Gunnar Reiss-Andersen (1896–1964), Norwegian poet
- Gunnar Rohrbacher (born 1968), American author
- Gunnar Seidenfaden (1908–2001), Danish diplomat and botanist
- Gunnar Staalesen (born 1947), Norwegian writer
- Gunnar Stålsett (born 1935), Norwegian theologician and politician
- Gunnar Taucher (1886–1941), Finnish architect
- Gunnar Thoresen (footballer) (1920–2017), Norwegian football player
- Gunnar Thoresen (bobsledder) (1921–1972), Norwegian bobsledder
- Gunnar Heiðar Þorvaldsson (born 1982), Icelandic football player
- Gunnar Uusi (1931–1981), Estonian chess player
- Gunnar Widforss (1879–1934), Swedish-American painter
- Gunnar Wiklund (1935–1989), Swedish singer

== See also ==
- The Gunnar Cup is the championship trophy for the United States bandy championship.
- Gunnar Optiks, an eyewear company
- Gunna, Scotland, a Scottish island thought to have been named after someone called Gunnar or Gunni.
- Gunner (disambiguation)
- Gunārs
- Gunar
