= Gunnarson =

Gunnarson is a surname of Scandinavian origin, originated from a patronymic meaning 'son of Gunnar'. Notable people with the surname include:

- Dean Gunnarson (born 1964), Canadian escapologist
- Gunnar Gunnarson (born 1918), Swedish marxist historian
- Reidun Gunnarson
