= Pashayev =

Pashayev (feminine Pashayeva) (Azerbaijani: Paşayev) is a surname, likely of Azerbaijani origin. Notable people with the surname include:

- Arif Pashayev (born 1934), Azerbaijani radiophysicist and academician
- Atakhan Pashayev (1938–2022), Azerbaijani government executive
- Bakhsheyis Pashayev (1936–1992), Azerbaijani soldier
- Ganira Pashayeva (1975–2023), Azerbaijani politician
- Hafiz Pashayev (born 1941), Azerbaijani diplomat and government minister
- Maksym Pashayev (1988–2008), Azerbaijani-Ukrainian footballer
- Mehriban Aliyeva (née Pashayeva; born 1964), Azerbaijani politician and physician
- Mir Jalal Pashayev (1908–1978), Azerbaijani writer and literary critic
- Nargiz Pashayeva (born 1962), Azerbaijani philologist and literary critic
- Nargiz Pashayeva (footballer) (born 1987), Azerbaijani footballer
- Niyamaddin Pashayev (born 1980), Azerbaijani taekwondo athlete
- Nizami Pashayev (born 1981), Azerbaijani weightlifter
- Osman Pashayev (born 1977), Crimean Tatar journalist and producer
- Pavel Pashayev (born 1988), Azerbaijani-Ukrainian footballer
- Rizvan Pashayev (1949–2007), Azerbaijani mathematician
- Telman Pashayev (born 1953), Soviet Azerbaijani wrestler
- Zaur Pashayev (disambiguation), multiple people

== See also ==
- Aleksandr Melik-Pashayev (1905–1964), Soviet Armenian conductor, composer, pianist and pedagogue
