= Barranco =

Barranco (pronounced [baˈraŋko]), which is Spanish for "ravine", may refer to:

== Places ==
- Barranco, Belize, a village in Toledo District, Belize
- Barranco, Spain, a village south of Jijona, Alicante, Spain
- Barranco District, Peru
- Barranco de Loba, Colombia

== Persons ==
- Bruno Barranco (born 1997), Argentine football (soccer) player
- María Barranco (born 1961), Spanish actress
- Javi Barranco (born 1987), Spanish football (soccer) player
- Juan Barranco, pseudonym of Spanish comic book artist Óscar Jiménez
- Juan Barranco Gallardo, mayor of Madrid 1986–1989
- Dr. Crispin Barranco,(Filipino, born 1925) Physician
- Jessica Barranco, (born 1990) attorney

== See also ==
- Barranca (disambiguation)
- Barrancos
