= Gundars =

Male given name

- Gender: Male

Origin
- Region of origin: Latvia

Other names
- Related names: Gunārs, Guntis, Guntars, Gunnar

Gundars is a Latvian masculine given name and may refer to:

- Gundars Āboliņš (born 1960), Latvian actor
- Gundars Bērziņš (1959–2023), Latvian accountant and politician
- Gundars Bojārs (born 1967), Latvian politician
- Gundars Celitāns (born 1985), Latvian volleyball player
- Gundars Daudze (born 1965), Latvian physician and politician
- Gundars Vētra (born 1967), Latvian basketball player

== See also ==
- Gundar (disambiguation)
