= Magaña (surname) =

Magaña is a Spanish surname. It may refer to:

- Aldo Magaña (born 1996), Mexican footballer
- Álvaro Magaña (1925–2001), Salvadorean politician
- Ángel Magaña (1915–1982), Argentine actor
- Angela Magaña (born 1983), American mixed martial artist
- Brenda Magaña (born 1977), Mexican gymnast
- Cristian Magaña (born 1991), Chilean footballer
- Delia Magaña (1903–1996), Mexican actress, singer and dancer
- Eduardo Magaña (born 1984), Mexican archer
- Encarnación Magaña (1921–1942), Spanish anarchist and feminist
- Gildardo Magaña (1891–1939), Mexican general, politician and revolutionary
- Gumersindo Magaña (1939–2013), Mexican politician
- Israel Ledesma Magaña (1954–2014), Mexican politician
- José Luis Valle Magaña (born 1959), Mexican politician
- Kevin Magaña (born 1998), Mexican footballer
- Mardonio Magaña (c.1865–1947), Mexican educator and sculptor
- Margarita Magaña (born 1979), Mexican actress and model
- Oscar Magaña (born 1987), Chilean footballer
- Raúl Magaña (1940–2009), Salvadoran footballer and manager
- Diego Magaña Tejero (born 1982), Spanish winemaker
- Luis Antonio (Tony) Magaña (born 1999), Spiritual Leader
