= Guntis =

- Gender: Male

Origin
- Region of origin: Latvia

Other names
- Related names: Gunta (feminine version), Guntars, Gundars, Gunārs

Guntis is a Latvian masculine given name and may refer to:

- Guntis Belēvičs (born 1958), Latvian politician
- Guntis Džeriņš (born 1985), Latvian ice-hockey player
- Guntis Endzels (born 1967), Latvian basketball coach
- Guntis Galviņš (born 1986) Latvian ice-hockey player
- Guntis Osis (born 1962), Latvian bobsledder and Olympic medalist
- Guntis Peders (born 1973), Latvian track and field athlete, hurdler and Olympic competitor
- Guntis Rēķis (born 1974), Latvian luger and Olympic competitor
- Guntis Sics (born ????), Australian sound engineer
- Guntis Ulmanis (born 1939), Latvian politician, fifth President of Latvia
- Guntis Valneris (born 1967), Latvian draughts player
