= William Matheson =

William Matheson may refer to:

- William Matheson (scholar), Scottish Gaelic scholar, academic, and minister
- William John Matheson, American industrialist
- William Drummond Matheson, Canadian World War I flying ace

== See also ==
- Wilhelm Matheson, Norwegian judge
