= Segato =

Segato is an Italian surname. Notable people with the surname include:

- Armando Segato (1930–1973), Italian footballer
- Girolamo Segato (1792–1836), Italian naturalist, cartographer, Egyptologist, and anatomist
- Guglielmo Segato (1906–1979), Italian cyclist
- Lorraine Segato (born 1956), Canadian singer-songwriter
- Nicola Segato (born 1987), Italian footballer
- Rita Laura Segato (born 1951), Argentine-Brazilian academic

== See also ==
- Massimo Serato (1916–1989), born Giuseppe Segato, Italian actor
