= Bjorkstrand =

Bjorkstrand or Björkstrand is a surname. Notable people with the surname include:

- Kåre Björkstrand (born 1987), Finnish footballer
- Oliver Bjorkstrand (born 1995), Danish ice hockey player
- Patrick Bjorkstrand (born 1992), Danish ice hockey player
- Todd Bjorkstrand (born 1962), American ice hockey coach and former player
