= Reidun =

Reidun (sometimes also spelled 'Reidunn') is an Old Norse name for girls and women, mostly used in Norway. The name Reidun consists of the elements Hreiðr (meaning house) and unnr (sometimes translated as to wave). Another translation for unnr would be elska, meaning to love. The first part of the name, Hreiðr, can also be translated as nest, meaning the name Reidun could refer to a woman who loves her home or nest.

Reidun was most popular as a name in the 1930s and 1940s. 9,195 women in Norway have Reidunn as their first name. The name has been used rarely as a first name in the 21st century.

In Sweden the name Reidun has become rare, falling far below the top 100 list of women's names in Sweden.

== Notable people called Reidun ==
Reidun is a given name for girls and women. Notable people with the given name include:

- Reidun Andersson (1922–1992), Norwegian politician
- Reidun Andreassen (born 1936), Norwegian politician
- Reidun Brusletten (born 1936), Norwegian politician
- Reidun Gravdahl (born 1948), Norwegian politician
- Reidun Gunnarson, Norwegian handball player
- Reidun Laengen (1948-1995), Norwegian cross-country skier
- Reidun Røed (1921–2009), Norwegian resistance member
- Reidun Seth (born 1966), Norwegian footballer
- Reidun Tatham (born 1978), Canadian synchronized swimmer
- Reidun Twarock, German mathematician
