= Guntars =

Male given name

- Gender: Male
- Name day: 16 March

Origin
- Region of origin: Latvia

Other names
- Related names: Guntis, Gundars, Gunārs

Guntars is a Latvian masculine given name and may refer to:

- Guntars Antoms (born 1960), Latvian chess international master
- Guntars Deičmans (born 1983), Latvian swimmer
- Guntars Krasts (born 1957), Latvian politician; former prime minister of Latvia
- Guntars Mankus (born 1969), Latvian orienteer, rogainer and adventure racer
- Guntars Silagailis (born 1984), Latvian professional footballer
