= Wilhelm Matheson =

Norwegian Supreme Court Justice (born 1955)

Wilhelm Eger Matheson (born 5 May 1955) is a Norwegian Supreme Court Justice. Matheson took office in November 2009.

== Personal life ==
Born in Oslo, he was divorced once and subsequently remarried; these marriages produced two children each.

== Education ==
Wilhelm Matheson graduated with a degree from the University of Oslo in 1982. He has been employed as higher executive officer and was legal adviser in the Law Department of the Norwegian Ministry of Justice and also as a guest researcher at the Max Planck institute in Freiburg, Germany. From 1987 to 1988, Matheson served as deputy judge at the district recorder office of Lier, Røyken and Hurum. In 1989 he was employed as deputy advocate in the law firm Mellbye, Schjoldager, Sejersted, Tenden. Between 1990 and 2009 he was employed as a lawyer and partner in Wiersholm. After this, he took the role of supreme court justice.

== Appointment to the Supreme Court ==
Matheson was appointed Supreme Court Justice on 31 October 2008 together with Bergljot Webster and Erik Møse. The process surrounding the 2008 appointments was criticised by professor of comparative politics at the University of Bergen, Gunnar Grendstad for a "lack of transparency". Journalist Hanne Skartveit (working for Verdens Gang) tried to push the three newly appointed judges to reveal their political positions in a selection of matters of public interest. Matheson (and his two new colleagues) did not, however, accept the contentions of the critics and refused to bind themselves to positions that later could become subject to Supreme Court considerations.

== In the Supreme Court ==
Matheson expresses belief in the ideal of unbiased judges; however, he also considers it self-evident that decisions made in the court of law to some extent express the attitudes of the judges, and not "the so-called true law".

As of January 2011, Matheson has dissented in two Supreme Court decisions: One (in January 2010) regarding the demand from a kiosk-company demanding compensation for the loss of income in the Public Roads Administration in the aftermath of a landslide blocking a nearby road (and the kiosk's source of income). The majority of the three justices passed judgment in favour of the government, while the dissenting justices (counting two) argued that the government ought to be seen as responsible for the company's loss of income. Matheson wrote this dissent.

In the second case, of March 2010, Matheson was the sole dissenter against four justices in a case regarding compensation for non-pecuniary damages: The actor Gøril Mauseth demanded compensation from the Norwegian Broadcasting Company (NRK) in the aftermath of the screening of a nude scene including Mauseth from the movie Brent av frost, in conflict with a contract stipulating that this scene was not to be used in the purpose of marketing. The majority of four justices passed judgment in favour of Mauseth, against Matheson's lone dissent in favour of NRK.
