= Hüsnü =

Hüsnü (Arabic: حسني) is a Turkish masculine given name. It is also used as a surname. People with the name include:

== Given name ==
=== First name ===
- Hüsnü Çakırgil (born 1965), Turkish basketball player
- Hüsnü Doğan (born 1944), Turkish politician
- Hüsnü A. Göksel (1919–2002), Turkish physician
- Hüsnü Özkara (born 1955), Turkish football player
- Hüsnü Özyeğin (born 1944), Turkish businessman
- Hüsnü Savman (1908–1948), Turkish football player
- Hüsnü Şenlendirici (born 1976), Turkish musician

== Middle name ==
- Fazıl Hüsnü Dağlarca (1914–2008), Turkish poet
- Fuat Hüsnü Kayacan (1879–1963), Turkish football player and referee
- Hamit Hüsnü Kayacan (1868–1952), Turkish intellectual and sports executive
- Hasan Hüsnü Erdem (1889–1974), Turkish scholar and Mufti
- Hüseyin Hüsnü Pasha (born 1852) (1852–1918), Ottoman admiral
- Hüseyin Hüsnü Pasha (born 1856) (1856–1926), Ottoman general
- Hüseyin Hüsnü Emir Erkilet (1883–1954), Ottoman general
- Süleyman Hüsnü Paşa (1838–1892), Ottoman general

== Surname ==
- Mehmet Husnu (born 1972), Cypriot snooker player

== See also ==
- Hosni (disambiguation)
