= Gunārs =

Male given name

- Gender: Male
- Name day: 8 December

Origin
- Region of origin: Latvia

Other names
- Related names: Gundars, Gunnar, Guntars, Gunar

Gunārs is a Latvian masculine given name. It is a cognate of the name Gunnar. Notable people with the given name include:

- Gunārs Astra (1931–1988), Latvian human rights activist and anti-Soviet dissident
- Gunārs Birkerts (1925–2017), Latvian-born American architect
- Gunārs Cilinskis (1931–1992), Latvian actor, film director and screenwriter
- Gunārs Ķirsons (born 1951), Latvian entrepreneur and businessman
- Gunārs Lūsis (born 1950), Latvian artist and graphic designer
- Gunārs Piesis (1931–1996), Latvian film director
- Gunārs Priede (1928–2000), Latvian playwright, engineer and architect
- Gunārs Saliņš (1924–2010), Latvian modernist poet
- Gunārs Skvorcovs (born 1990), Latvian ice hockey right winger
- Gunārs Ulmanis (1938–2010), Latvian football right wing midfielder
