= Torstein Høverstad =

Norwegian educator and scholar

- Born: April 1, 1880; Vang Municipality, Norway
- Died: June 25, 1959 (aged 79)
- Occupation: Historian
- Children: Gunnar Høverstad

Torstein Høverstad (April 1, 1880 – June 25, 1959) was a Norwegian educator, teacher educator, school historian, and government scholar.

Høverstad was born in Vang Municipality in Christians amt (county). He was the son of Torgeir Andersen Andrisson Høverstad, a farmer from Valdres, and Gjertrud Helgesdatter Andrisson Høverstad (née Helgesdatter Leine). He graduated from Hamar Normal School in 1901 and was a teacher at Akershus County School from 1902 to 1907. He received his examen artium in 1906, and he then taught at Aars and Voss School in Oslo from 1907 to 1909, and at Notodden Normal School from 1909 to 1915. He received his candidatus philologiæ in 1914 and was the principal at Kristiansand Cathedral School from 1915 to 1918. He received his doctorate in 1918 with the dissertation Norsk skulesoga det store interregnum, 1739–1827 (Norwegian School History. The Great Interregnum, 1739–1827). From 1922 to 1927 he worked at Levanger Nornal School, after which he was a lifetime government scholar. He was the father of the wartime pilot Gunnar Høverstad.

Starting around 1910, Høverstad conceived the idea of establishing a Norwegian teacher's college, and he worked actively from 1916 to 1922 to realize this idea through both the government and the Storting. He participated in an investigative committee on the issue from 1920 to 1921, and he even conducted a college course at Bondi in Asker Municipality that same year. When the Norwegian College of Teaching in Trondheim was established in 1922, Høverstad was selected as a lecturer in history by the majority of the expert committee. However, the ministry chose to follow the committee's minority, and it appointed Arne Bergsgård instead of Høverstad.

Høvstad became a government scholar on several occasions, first in 1915, when he received an annual stipend for his school history studies, and then in 1927, when he received a lifetime position. He served as the publisher and editor of Norsk pedagogisk tidsskrift (the Norwegian Journal of Education) from 1917 onward.

== Bibliography ==
- Norsk skulesoga. 1. Det store interregnum 1739–1827 (Norwegian School History. The Great Interregnum, 1739–1827). Steenske forlag, 1918
- Norsk skulesoga. 2. Frå einvelde til folkestyre 1814–1842 (Norwegian School History. From Monarchy to Democracy, 1814–1842). Steenske forlag, 1930
- Ein norsk lærarhøgskule: Historisk utsyn og program (A Norwegian Teacher's College: Historical Perspective and Program). Kristiania, 1919
- Uppseding og uppsedarar (Upbringing and Upbringers). Steenske forlag, 1920
- Ole Vig: ein norrøn uppsedar (Ole Vig: A Norse Educator). Trondheim, 1924
- Norrøn livskunst (The Norse Art of Living). Oslo, 1941
