= Tommy De Jong =

French-Dutch footballer (born 1987)

Tommy de Jong
Personal information
- Full name: Thomas de Jong
- Date of birth: 6 February 1987 (age 39)
- Place of birth: Strasbourg, France
- Height: 1.75 m (5 ft 9 in)
- Position: Midfielder

Youth career
- 2004–2006: Strasbourg

Senior career*
Years	Team	Apps	(Gls)
2004–2007	Strasbourg B		
2007–2008	Martigues	2	(0)
2008–2009	Dordrecht	12	(0)
2009–2010	Strasbourg B	19	(1)
2010–2011	SC Schiltigheim		
2011–2012	Strasbourg	12	(1)
2012–2013	FC Steinseltz		
2013–2014	ASPV Strasbourg		
- * Club domestic league appearances and goals

Tommy de Jong (born 6 February 1987) is a French-Dutch former professional footballer who played as a midfielder.

== Early life ==
De Jong was born in Strasbourg and is a native of Herrlisheim. His father is from the Netherlands.

== Career ==
De Jong joined Strasbourg's youth academy at the age of 12. In 2006 he won the Coupe Gambardella with Strasbourg.

After spending two seasons with the Strasbourg reserves, he moved to Martigues where he made two substitute appearances in the third tier.

In May 2008, following a trial, De Jong joined Eerste Divisie club FC Dordrecht on a three-year contract.

After his stints with Martigues and Dordrecht he returned to Alsace with SC Schiltigheim.

In 2011 De Jong went back to Strasbourg to play for the club's reserves in the Division d'Honneur. Having scored nine goals and contributed one assist in eight games for the reserves and with several first-team attacking injured, the first team's manager François Keller deploying him as a striker. De Jong scored his first goal for the first team in a match against Chaumont.

In summer 2012, after his contract with Strasbourg expired, he moved to amateur side FC Steinseltz.

== Personal life ==
As of August 2012 De Jong had a wife and two children.
