= Gunna, Scotland =

Island near Scotland

Gunna
Gunnaigh (Gaelic)
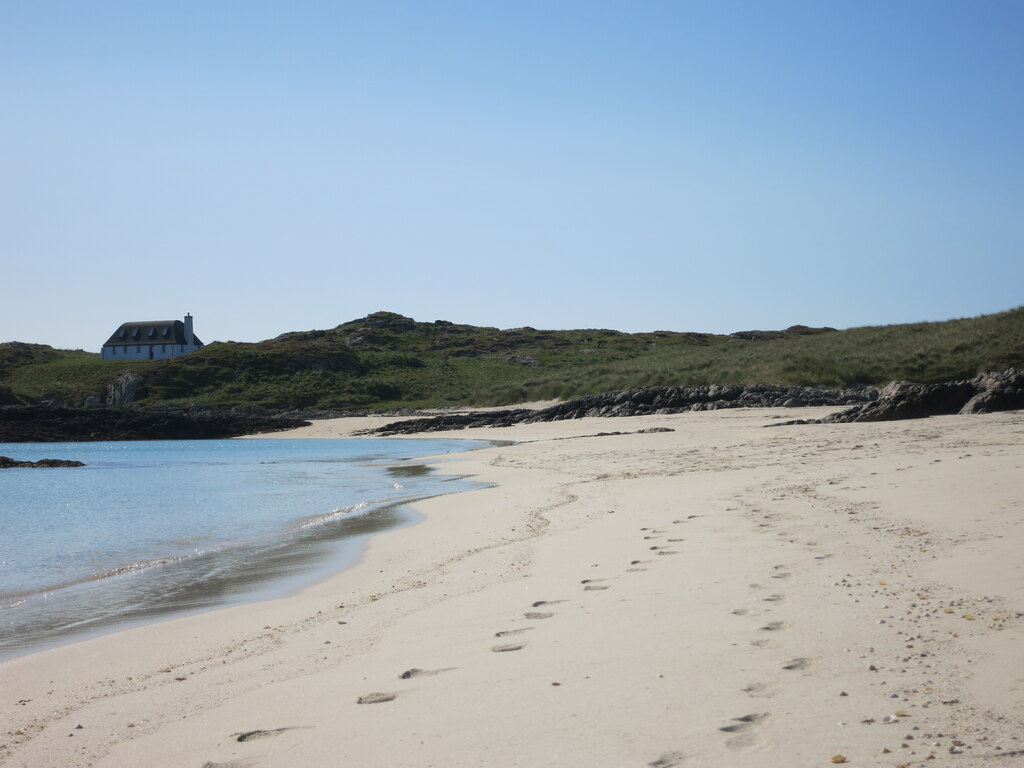
- Beach on the south side of the island

Location
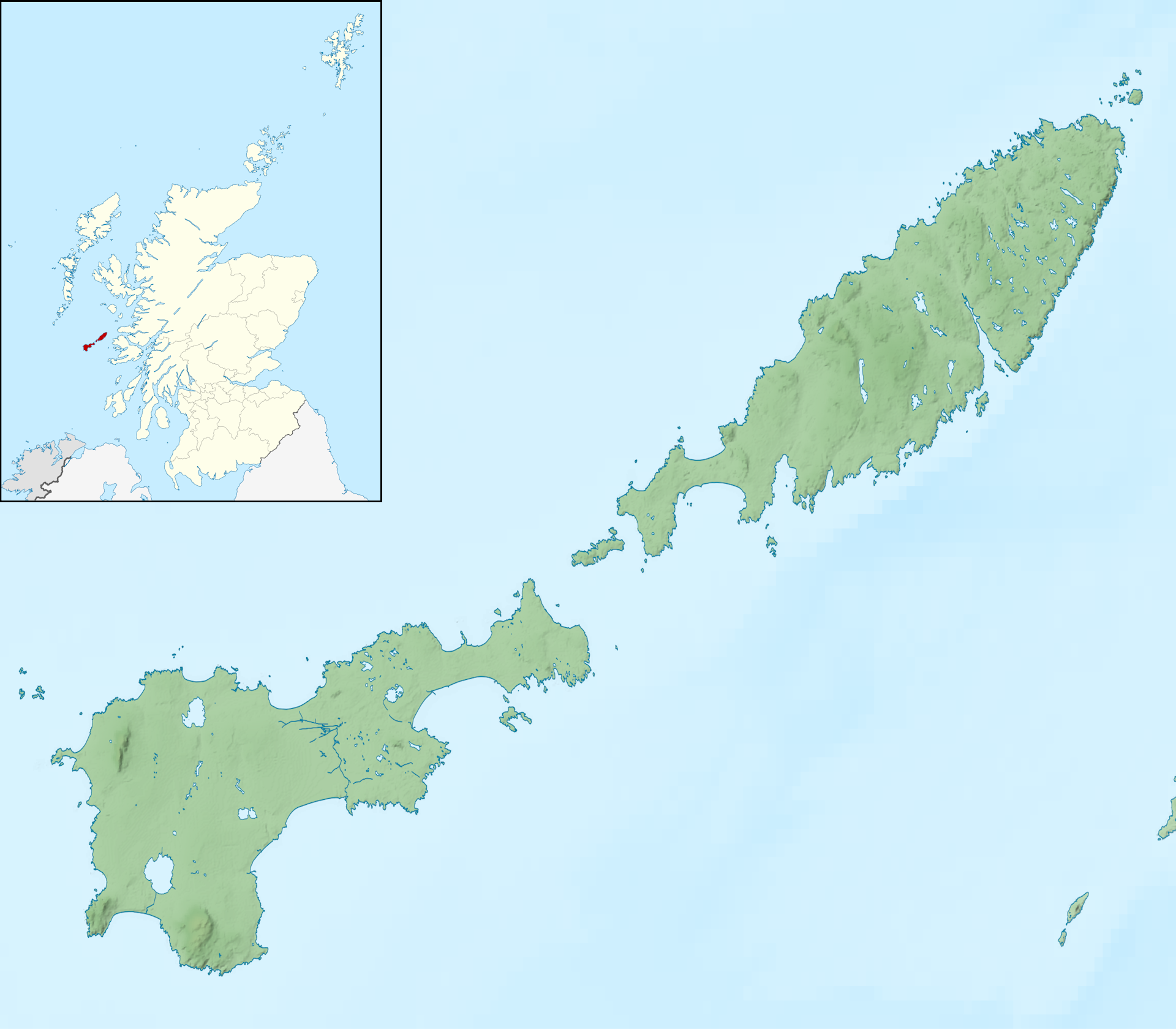
- Gunna shown next to Coll and Tiree Gunna shown within Argyll and Bute
- OS grid reference: NM100513
- Coordinates: 56.56°N 6.72°W

Name
- Name meaning: "Gunni's island"
- Old Norse name: Gunni-øy

Physical geography
- Island group: Mull
- Area: 69 ha (1/4 sq mi)
- Area rank: 176
- Highest elevation: 35 m (115 ft)

Administration
- Council area: Argyll and Bute
- Country: Scotland
- Sovereign state: United Kingdom

Demographics
- Population: 0
- Population rank: 0

Gunna (Gaelic: Gunnaigh) is an island in the Inner Hebrides of Scotland.

== Geography and geology ==
Gunna lies between Coll and Tiree, closer to Coll. It is 69 hectares (1/4 square mile) in area and 35 metres (115 feet) at its highest point. At its widest it is 500 metres (550 yards). It has no permanent inhabitants; the only house is used as a holiday residence by its owner.

It is surrounded by smaller islands including Eilean Frachlan (just off the north coast), Eilean nan Gamhna off the south coast, Soy Gunna to the north east, and Eilean Bhoramull, which is nearer Coll. It is surrounded by many rocks, especially in Gunna Sound (Scottish Gaelic: Am Bun Dubh), between it and Tiree.

According to Haswell-Smith, the island has a: "bedrock of paragneiss schist with a light sandy soil. Metasediments in the west grade into undifferentiated gneiss in the east".

== Etymology and history ==
"Gunni" is a Norse forename, and Haswell-Smith suggests that Gunni-øy means "island of Gunni the Dane" (although it is not recorded for which Gunni the island was named) or conceivably that the modern name is from Eilean nan Gamhna, Gaelic for "island of the stirks". Mac an Tàilleir suggests that the Norse means "Gunnar (hard R)'s island".

According to Iain Mac an Tàilleir, Gunna is mentioned in the lines of a song, "Farewell beyond Gunna to Mull of the great mountains".

== Wildlife ==
Gunna supports a wide range of sea birds, as well as geese, and shelducks. Grey seals also breed there.

It is currently used for grazing from Coll.

== Gunna in fiction ==
Sandy Duncanson, the villain of Neil Munro's novel The New Road, comes from here, one chapter is titled "The Man from Gunna". It is suggested that this symbolises his ambiguous nature, since Tiree was "one of Mac Cailean Mór's loyal islands", and Coll was wild country.

== See also ==
- List of islands of Scotland
