= Marc Keller =

French footballer (born 1968)

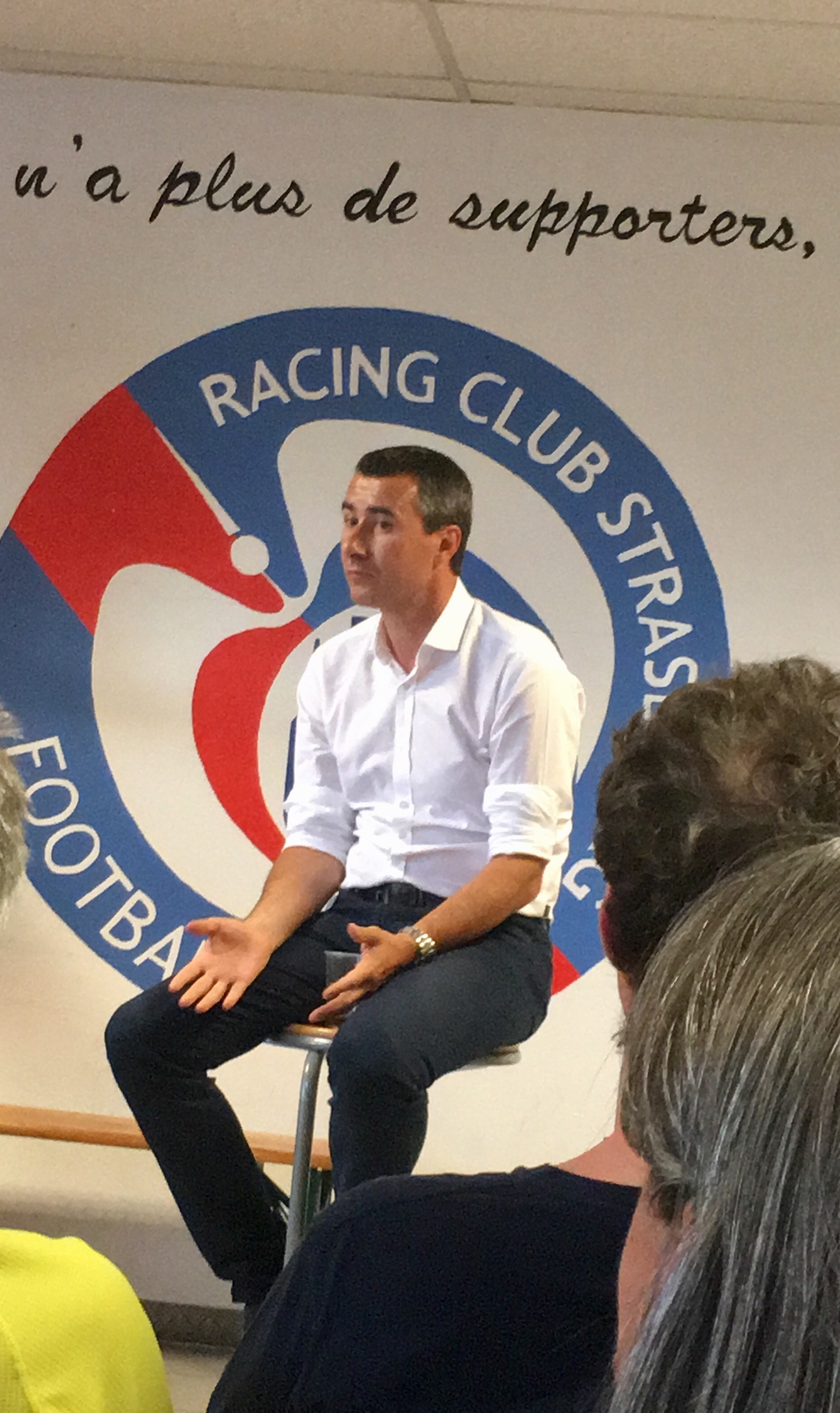
- Keller in 2017

Personal information
- Full name: Marc Albert Joseph Keller
- Date of birth: 14 January 1968 (age 58)
- Place of birth: Colmar, Haut-Rhin, France
- Height: 1.81 m (5 ft 11 in)
- Position: Midfielder

Youth career
- Fessenheim
- SR Colmar

Senior career*
Years	Team	Apps	(Gls)
1987–1991	Mulhouse	118	(15)
1991–1996	Strasbourg	149	(35)
1996–1998	Karlsruher SC	61	(13)
1998–2001	West Ham United	44	(5)
2000–2001	→ Portsmouth (loan)	3	(0)
2001–2002	Blackburn Rovers	2	(0)
Total		377	(68)

International career
1995–1998	France	6	(1)
- * Club domestic league appearances and goals

Marc Albert Joseph Keller (born 14 January 1968) is a French former professional footballer and current executive who has been president of RC Strasbourg Alsace since 2012. He played primarily as a midfielder, for clubs in France, Germany and England. He played six games for the national side, scoring one goal against Brazil.

Keller began his executive career at Strasbourg from 2001 to 2006, followed by a tenure at Monaco from 2006 to 2011. In June 2012, he led a consortium that bought Strasbourg, taking them from the fourth tier to Ligue 1. He sold the club to BlueCo in 2023 while remaining president.

== Club career ==
=== Early career ===
Keller began his career in France playing for Mulhouse. In 1991 he moved to Strasbourg whom he helped win the 1995 UEFA Intertoto Cup, scoring a hat-trick in the second leg of the final against FC Tirol Innsbruck. In 1996 he moved to Germany to play for Karlsruher SC.

=== West Ham United ===
Keller was signed by West Ham in July 1998 on a free transfer by manager Harry Redknapp. He made his debut on 12 September in a 2–1 home win against Liverpool as an 86th-minute substitute for John Hartson, and scored his first goal on 22 November in a 2–0 away win against Derby County. He played 22 games in his first season in all competitions scoring five goals as West Ham finished in fifth place in the Premier League to qualify for the Intertoto Cup.

The following season, Keller played four games in the tournament including the second leg of the final away against Metz. West Ham won the game 3–1 to win the trophy 3–2 on aggregate, this being the second time Keller had won the tournament having also won it four years previously at Strasbourg. West Ham therefore qualified for the UEFA Cup as one of the three winners of the competition for that season. Keller played in three of West Ham's four games in the UEFA Cup and 34 games with one goal in all competitions during the 2000–01 season. However, in the 2001–02 season he played just a single game, against Walsall in the League Cup. In September 2000, Keller was sent on loan to Portsmouth of Division One. He played three games before returning to West Ham.

=== Blackburn Rovers ===
In January 2001, Keller was allowed to leave on a free transfer to Blackburn Rovers, as part of a deal which saw Christian Dailly move to West Ham for £1.7 million. Keller played only five games for Blackburn, two in the league and three in the FA Cup, all as substitute appearances. His last game came on 7 March 2001, a 3–0 home win against Bolton Wanderers, when he was a 73rd-minute substitute for Damien Duff. It was his last game in professional football.

== International career ==
Keller made his debut for France on 15 November 1995 in a UEFA Euro 1996 qualifier at home to Israel in Caen, as a last-minute substitute for Christian Karembeu. He played six times for France, scoring once. On 3 June 1997 in a match in Le Tournoi, Keller scored the equaliser in a 1–1 draw with Brazil, where Roberto Carlos had previously scored his iconic free kick. His last game was on 25 March 1998, from the bench in a 1–0 friendly loss away to Russia.

== Executive career ==
Keller was hired as director of football and then chief executive at Strasbourg in 2001, with the club in Ligue 2. In June 2006, following their relegation back, he left for Monaco in Ligue 1. He had two spells with the principality club, with a brief intermission between 2008 and 2009, and left following their relegation in June 2011.

In June 2012, Keller led a local consortium that bought Strasbourg from Frédéric Sitterlé, paying a euro each for the corporate and branding rights of the club. Having taken the team from the fourth tier to being established in Ligue 1, he sold the club in June 2023 to BlueCo, owners of Chelsea, while remaining club president.

== Personal life ==
Keller's wife Sabryna is the founder of Femmes de Foot, an association representing women in football. His younger brother François played Strasbourg and Fulham and was later hired by the former as the academy director; Marc Keller's son Mehdi joined as his assistant in June 2022.

In April 2019, Keller received the Bretzel d'or (Golden Pretzel), a cultural award in Alsace.

== Honours ==
Orders

- Knight of the Legion of Honour: 2023
