= Hosni =

Hosni (also spelled Husni, Hosny or Housni, Arabic: حسني or Persian: حُسنی) may refer to:

== Places ==
- Husni, Iran, a village in Isfahan Province

== Given name ==
- Husni al-Barazi (1895–1975), Syrian politician
- Hosni Mubarak (1928–2020), Egyptian politician, fourth President of Egypt
- Husni al-Za'im (1897–1949), Syrian politician, Syrian President and Prime Minister
- Housni Mkouboi (born 1977), French rapper
- Housni Benslimane (born 1935), senior Moroccan Gendarmerie officer
- Husni Abdel Wahed (born 1960), Palestinian journalist, politician and diplomat
- Hosny Abd Rabo (born 1984), Egyptian footballer and football manager
- Hosny Fathy (born 1989), Egyptian footballer

== Surname ==
- Ahmed Hosny (born 1991), Egyptian squash player
- Ahmed Salah Hosny (born 1979), Egyptian footballer
- Amad Al Hosni (born 1984), Omani footballer
- Dawood Hosni (1870–1937), Egyptian musician
- Dina Hosny (born 1983), Egyptian sport shooter
- Farouk Hosny (born 1938), Egyptian abstract painter
- Hadia Hosny (born 1988), Egyptian badminton player
- Hassan Hosny (1931–2020), Egyptian actor
- Hazem Hosny (1951–2024), Egyptian political scientist
- Larbi Hosni (born 1981), Algerian footballer
- Osama Hosny (born 1982), Egyptian footballer
- Rachid Housni (born 1990), Moroccan footballer
- Saad Hosny (born 1987), Egyptian footballer
- Soad Hosny (1943–2001), Egyptian actress
- Tamer Hosny (born 1977), Egyptian singer, actor, composer, director and songwriter

== See also ==
- Hassan (disambiguation)
- Hassoun
