= Gundar =

Gundar or Gündar may refer to:

== People ==
- Ayelet Gundar-Goshen (born 1982), Israeli author
- Esra Gündar (born 1980), Turkish female handballer

== Places ==
- Gundar River, river in the Virudhunagar and Tirunelveli districts of the Indian state of Tamil Nadu
  - Upper Gundar River, river in the Sivagangai district of the Indian state of Tamil Nadu
- Gundar Dam

== See also ==
- Gundars, a given name
