= Gunar =

Gunar is a surname. Notable people with the surname include:

- Gunar Kirchbach (born 1971), German sprint canoer
- B. Gunar Gruenke, stained glass artist in Wisconsin
- Nedim Günar (1932–2011), Turkish football defender

== See also ==
- Gunars
- Gunnar
