= Gunta (given name) =

- Gender: Female
- Name day: March 28

Origin
- Region of origin: Latvia

Other names
- Related names: Guntis

Gunta is a Latvian feminine given name. The associated name day is March 28.

== Notable people named Gunta ==
- Gunta Baško (born 1980), Latvian basketball player
- Gunta Latiševa-Čudare (born 1995), Latvian sprinter
- Gunta Stölzl (1897–1983), German textile artist
