= Magnus Johannesson =

Swedish economist

- Gunnar Magnus Johannesson
- Born: 9 December 1964 (age 61); Eksjö, Sweden

Academic background
- Education: Linköping University

Academic work
- Discipline: Experimental economics
- Institutions: Stockholm School of Economics

Gunnar Magnus Johannesson (born 9 December 1964) is a professor at the Stockholm School of Economics, as well as a former member of the Committee for the Prize in Economic Sciences in Memory of Alfred Nobel. He is known for his research in the field of experimental economics.
