= Anzhela Temirova =

Azerbaijani footballer (born 1987)

Personal information
- Date of birth: 24 May 1987 (age 39)
- Position: Goalkeeper

International career^{‡}
| Years | Team | Apps | (Gls) |
| 2004 | Azerbaijan U19 | 1 | (0) |
| 2010 | Azerbaijan | 3 | (0) |
- ‡ National team caps and goals as of 23 June 2010

Anzhela Temirova (Azerbaijani: Anjhela Temirova; born 24 May 1987) is an Azerbaijani former footballer who played as a goalkeeper. She has been a member of the Azerbaijan women's national team.
