= Adrian Sager =

Swiss footballer (born 1987)

Personal information
- Date of birth: 17 March 1987 (age 39)
- Place of birth: Switzerland
- Position: Defender

Team information
- Current team: SC Cham
- Number: 6

Senior career*
Years	Team	Apps	(Gls)
2005–2007	FC Lucerne	41	(1)
2007–	SC Cham	18	(0)
- * Club domestic league appearances and goals as of 16:28, 8 December 2009 (UTC)

Adrian Sager (born 17 March 1987) is a Swiss professional footballer who plays as a defender. His clubs include SC Cham and FC Lucerne.

== See also ==
- Football in Switzerland
- List of football clubs in Switzerland
