= David Ledy =

French footballer (born 1987)

Personal information
- Full name: David Ledy
- Date of birth: September 22, 1987 (age 39)
- Place of birth: Altkirch, France
- Height: 1.78 m (5 ft 10 in)
- Position: Forward

Youth career
- 1997–2004: Mulhouse

Senior career*
Years	Team	Apps	(Gls)
2005–2006	Mulhouse	20	(4)
2006–2009	Strasbourg B	68	(19)
2008–2014	Strasbourg	136	(41)
2014–2017	Martigues	65	(20)
2017–2018	Olympique Rovenain		
2019–2020	Istres	8	(0)

Managerial career
- Istres (youth coach)
- Olympique Rovenain (youth coach)
- * Club domestic league appearances and goals

David Ledy (born September 22, 1987 in Altkirch) is a retired French footballer.

== Club career ==
Ledy began his career with FC Mulhouse and joined RC Strasbourg in 2006, played here his first game on 7 November 2008 against FC Tours.

== Coaching career ==
After retiring in the summer 2020, Ledy started coaching youth teams, among others at FC Istres and Olympique Rovenain.
