= Mubarak Al Beloushi =

Kuwaiti footballer

Mubarak Al-Beloushi
Personal information
- Full name: Mubarak Al-Beloushi (Arabic:مبارك البلوشي)
- Date of birth: July 6, 1987 (age 39)
- Place of birth: Kuwait City, Kuwait
- Height: 1.76 m (5 ft 9 1/2 in)
- Position: Defender

Youth career
- 1995–2006: Al Arabi SC

Senior career*
Years	Team	Apps	(Gls)
2006–2017	Al Arabi SC	23	(3)
2006–2007	Muscat (loan)		

International career^{‡}
2010	Kuwait	1	(0)
- * Club domestic league appearances and goals as of July 1, 2014 ‡ National team caps and goals as of January 28, 2013

Mubarak Al-Beloushi (Arabic: مبارك البلوشي, born 6 July 1987) is a Kuwaiti footballer who is a defender for the VIVA Premier League club Al Arabi SC.

He played for Al-Arabi in the 2007 AFC Champions League group stage.

== Honors ==
=== Al Arabi SC ===
- Kuwait Emir Cup:1 2007-08
- Kuwait Crown Prince Cup:3 2006-07 2011-12 2014-15
- Kuwait Super Cup:2 2008, 2012
- Kuwait Federation Cup:1 2013-14
