= Nazar Penkovets =

Ukrainian footballer

Personal information
- Full name: Nazar Mykolayovych Penkovets
- Date of birth: 2 September 1987 (age 39)
- Place of birth: Kyiv, Ukrainian SSR
- Height: 2.02 m (6 ft 7 1/2 in)
- Position: Goalkeeper

Team information
- Current team: FC Kitzbühel
- Number: 24

Youth career
- 2002–2004: FC Zmina-Obolon Kyiv

Senior career*
| Years | Team | Apps | (Gls) |
| 2004–2005 | Obolon Kyiv | 0 | (0) |
| 2005 | → Obolon-2 Kyiv | 0 | (0) |
| 2006 | Inter Boyarka | 1 | (0) |
| 2007 | FC Antares Obukhiv | 5 | (0) |
| 2007 | FC Lokomotyv Hrebinka | | |
| 2008–2009 | Górnik Polkowice | | |
| 2009–2011 | Elana Toruń | 25 | (0) |
| 2011 | Zakarpattia Uzhhorod | 1 | (0) |
| 2012–2018 | Wisła Puławy | 136 | (0) |
| 2018– | FC Kitzbühel | 101 | (0) |
- * Club domestic league appearances and goals as of 27 June 2026

Nazar Mykolayovych Penkovets (Ukrainian: Назар Миколайович Пеньковець; born 2 September 1987) is a Ukrainian professional footballer who plays as a goalkeeper for Austrian club FC Kitzbühel.

Penkovets is a product of the FC Obolon-Zmina Youth Sportive School System. He played for the Ukrainian and Polish amateur or lower level clubs.

== Honours ==
Górnik Polkowice

- III liga Lower Silesia–Lubusz: 2008–09
