= Henrique (footballer, born May 1987) =

Brazilian footballer

Personal information
- Full name: Henrique Neris de Brito
- Date of birth: 11 May 1987 (age 39)
- Place of birth: São Paulo, Brazil
- Height: 1.75 m (5 ft 9 in)
- Position: Striker

Senior career*
Years	Team	Apps	(Gls)
2003–2005	Vila Real		
2006–2007	Atlético Paranaense		
2007–2009	Rio Ave	15	(1)
2010	Cuiabá		
- * Club domestic league appearances and goals

Henrique Neris de Brito (born 11 May 1987, in São Paulo), known as just Henrique, is a Brazilian former professional footballer who played as a striker.

He played for Portuguese side Sport Clube Vila Real. Henrique signed for Portuguese Liga club Rio Ave in 2007 from Brazilian football team Atlético Paranaense. After the releasing by Portuguese side Rio Ave was a half year without an club, before signed in the Spring of 2010 with Cuiabá Esporte Clube.
