= Hérick =

Brazilian footballer (born 1987)

Personal information
- Full name: Hérick Samora da Silva
- Date of birth: January 26, 1987 (age 39)
- Place of birth: Timbuí, Espírito Santo, Brazil
- Height: 1.87 m (6 ft 2 in)
- Position: Centre-back

Team information
- Current team: Uberlândia

Youth career
- 2005–2006: Cruzeiro

Senior career*
Years	Team	Apps	(Gls)
2005–2007	Cruzeiro B	33	(6)
2007	→ Guarani-MG (loan)	7	(0)
2007–2009	Cruzeiro	3	(0)
2007	→ Ipatinga (loan)	4	(0)
2008	→ Villa Nova-MG (loan)	25	(5)
2008	→ Cabofriense (loan)	9	(2)
2009	→ CRAC (loan)	11	(0)
2010	América RN	13	(0)
2010–	Uberlândia	1	(0)
- * Club domestic league appearances and goals

Hérick Samora da Silva (born January 26, 1987) is a Brazilian footballer, who plays as a centre-back for Uberlândia Esporte Clube.

== Career ==
Made full professional debut for Cruzeiro in a 4–1 defeat to Santos on July 7, 2007, in the Campeonato Brasileiro.
