= Rubén Royo =

Spanish footballer

Personal information
- Full name: Rubén Royo Castillo
- Date of birth: 30 September 1987 (age 39)
- Place of birth: Vitoria, Spain
- Height: 1.78 m (5 ft 10 in)
- Position: Midfielder

Team information
- Current team: Alfaro

Senior career*
Years	Team	Apps	(Gls)
2005–2006	Sariñena		
2006–2008	Alavés B		
2008–2009	Alavés	1	(0)
2008–2009	→ Écija (loan)	19	(1)
2009–2010	Mirandés	16	(2)
2010–2011	La Muela	36	(3)
2011–2013	Tudelano	62	(7)
2013–2014	Arandina	28	(3)
2014–2015	Alfaro	18	(8)
2015	Sariñena	16	(0)
2015–	Alfaro	36	(5)
- * Club domestic league appearances and goals as of 00:00, 16 May 2016 (UTC)

Rubén Royo Castillo (born 30 September 1987 in Vitoria-Gasteiz, Álava, Basque Country) is a Spanish former footballer who last played for CD Cortes as a midfielder.
