= Iván González (footballer, born 1987) =

Paraguayan footballer

Personal information
- Full name: Iván Emmanuel González Ferreira
- Date of birth: 28 January 1987 (age 39)
- Place of birth: Asunción, Paraguay
- Height: 1.78 m (5 ft 10 in)
- Positions: Left winger; right winger

Senior career*
| Years | Team | Apps | (Gls) |
| 2004 | Guaraní | 4 | (0) |
| 2005 | FC St. Gallen | 1 | (0) |
| 2005–2006 | VfB Stuttgart II | 11 | (0) |
| 2006 | Olimpia | | |
| 2007 | Sportivo Luqueño | 3 | (0) |
| 2007–2008 | FC Wil | 32 | (2) |
| 2009 | Sol de America | 15 | (1) |
| 2009–2010 | Cerro Porteño | 15 | (4) |
| 2010–2011 | Atlético Paranaense | 16 | (2) |
| 2011 | → América-RN (loan) | 12 | (0) |
| 2012–2016 | Guaraní | 164 | (32) |
| 2017 | Rubio Ñu | 19 | (3) |
| 2018 | Delfín | 2 | (0) |
| 2018 | Deportivo Capiatá | 0 | (0) |
- * Club domestic league appearances and goals as of 21:48, 10 October 2019 (UTC)

Iván Emmanuel González Ferreira (born 28 January 1987, in Asunción) is a Paraguayan footballer. He was on trial at Hapoel Be'er Sheva in the Israeli Premier League in July 2009, but signed for Cerro Porteño later that month. In July 2010, he moved to the Brazilian side Atlético Paranaense.

Iván is the brother of Celso and Julio.

== Career ==
Began speaking Guaraní football. In others, had a spell at St. Gallen in Switzerland,

Then it was a subsidiary of VfB Stuttgart. In 2006, he returned to Paraguayan football, more exactly to Olimpia of Paraguay in which he had many opportunities. In 2007 passed the Sportivo Luqueño and the second half of 2007 was to FC Wil in Switzerland where he played his best sporting achievement.

In 2009, he returned to Paraguay to the Sun of America where he participated in tournaments where he had ups and downs in income protention that deprived the opportunity to appear. And at times it has set itself made the difference. Scored the "Paraguayan Apertura Tournament."

In the second half of 2009 was hired by Cerro Porteno, Paraguay the ultimate champion. In 2010, he was hired by Atletico Paranaense to compete in the Campeonato Brasileiro. Atletico Paranaense acquired 50% of his passes.

Ivan is characterized by his strong kick and speed.
