= Gunnar Berg Lampe =

Norwegian tourist industry manager

- Born: 28 March 1892; Bergen, Norway
- Died: 29 May 1978 (aged 86)
- Occupation: Tourist industry manager
- Awards: Order of St. Olav (1950)

Gunnar Berg Lampe (28 March 1892 – 29 May 1978) was a Norwegian tourist industry manager. He was born in Bergen. He led the Norway Travel Association over a period of forty years, from 1922 to 1962. He was decorated Knight, First Class of the Order of St. Olav in 1950.
