= Barranco de Loba =

- Municipality and town
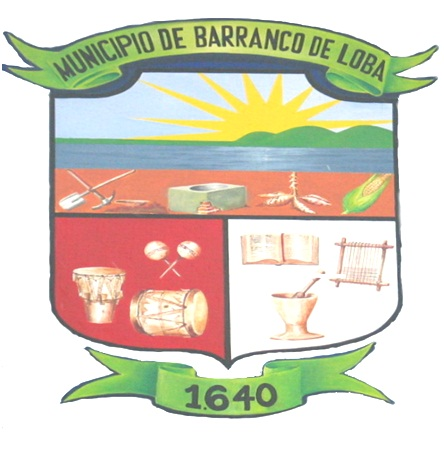
- Flag Coat of arms

- Location of the municipality and town of Barranco de Loba in the Bolívar Department of Colombia

- Location in Colombia
- Coordinates: 8°57′N 74°07′W
- Country: Colombia
- Department: Bolívar Department

Area
  - Total: 360 km^{2} (140 sq mi)

Population (Census 2018)
  - Total: 14,435
  - Density: 40/km^{2} (100/sq mi)

Barranco de Loba is a town and municipality located in the Bolívar Department, northern Colombia.

== Climate ==
Barranco de Loba has a tropical monsoon climate (Am) with moderate rainfall from December to March and heavy to very heavy rainfall from April to November.

Climate data for Barranco de Loba
Month	Jan	Feb	Mar	Apr	May	Jun	Jul	Aug	Sep	Oct	Nov	Dec	Year
Mean daily maximum °C (°F)	32.7 (90.9)	33.3 (91.9)	33.7 (92.7)	33.3 (91.9)	32.3 (90.1)	32.3 (90.1)	32.8 (91.0)	32.7 (90.9)	32.0 (89.6)	31.3 (88.3)	31.3 (88.3)	31.9 (89.4)	32.5 (90.4)
Daily mean °C (°F)	28.0 (82.4)	28.5 (83.3)	29.1 (84.4)	28.9 (84.0)	28.4 (83.1)	28.4 (83.1)	28.6 (83.5)	28.4 (83.1)	28.0 (82.4)	27.7 (81.9)	27.7 (81.9)	27.8 (82.0)	28.3 (82.9)
Mean daily minimum °C (°F)	23.4 (74.1)	23.7 (74.7)	24.5 (76.1)	24.5 (76.1)	24.6 (76.3)	24.5 (76.1)	24.4 (75.9)	24.2 (75.6)	24.0 (75.2)	24.1 (75.4)	24.2 (75.6)	23.8 (74.8)	24.2 (75.5)
Average rainfall mm (inches)	26.2 (1.03)	28.1 (1.11)	78.2 (3.08)	157.6 (6.20)	255.0 (10.04)	213.0 (8.39)	187.6 (7.39)	274.9 (10.82)	352.0 (13.86)	354.2 (13.94)	258.7 (10.19)	89.8 (3.54)	2,275.3 (89.59)
Average rainy days	1	2	4	8	10	9	8	11	13	13	10	4	93
Source: IDEAM
