= Erdene-Ochiriin Ganzorig =

Mongolian footballer

Personal information
- Date of birth: September 27, 1987 (age 39)
- Place of birth: Mongolia
- Position: Forward

Senior career*
Years	Team	Apps	(Gls)
2011–2018	Ulaanbaatar University		

International career
2007–2011	Mongolia	2	(0)
- * Club domestic league appearances and goals

Erdene-Ochiriin Ganzorig (Mongolian: Эрдэнэ-Очирийн Ганзориг; born 27 September 1987) is a Mongolian international footballer. He has appeared twice for the Mongolia national football team.
