= Emrah Tuncel =

Turkish footballer (born 1987)

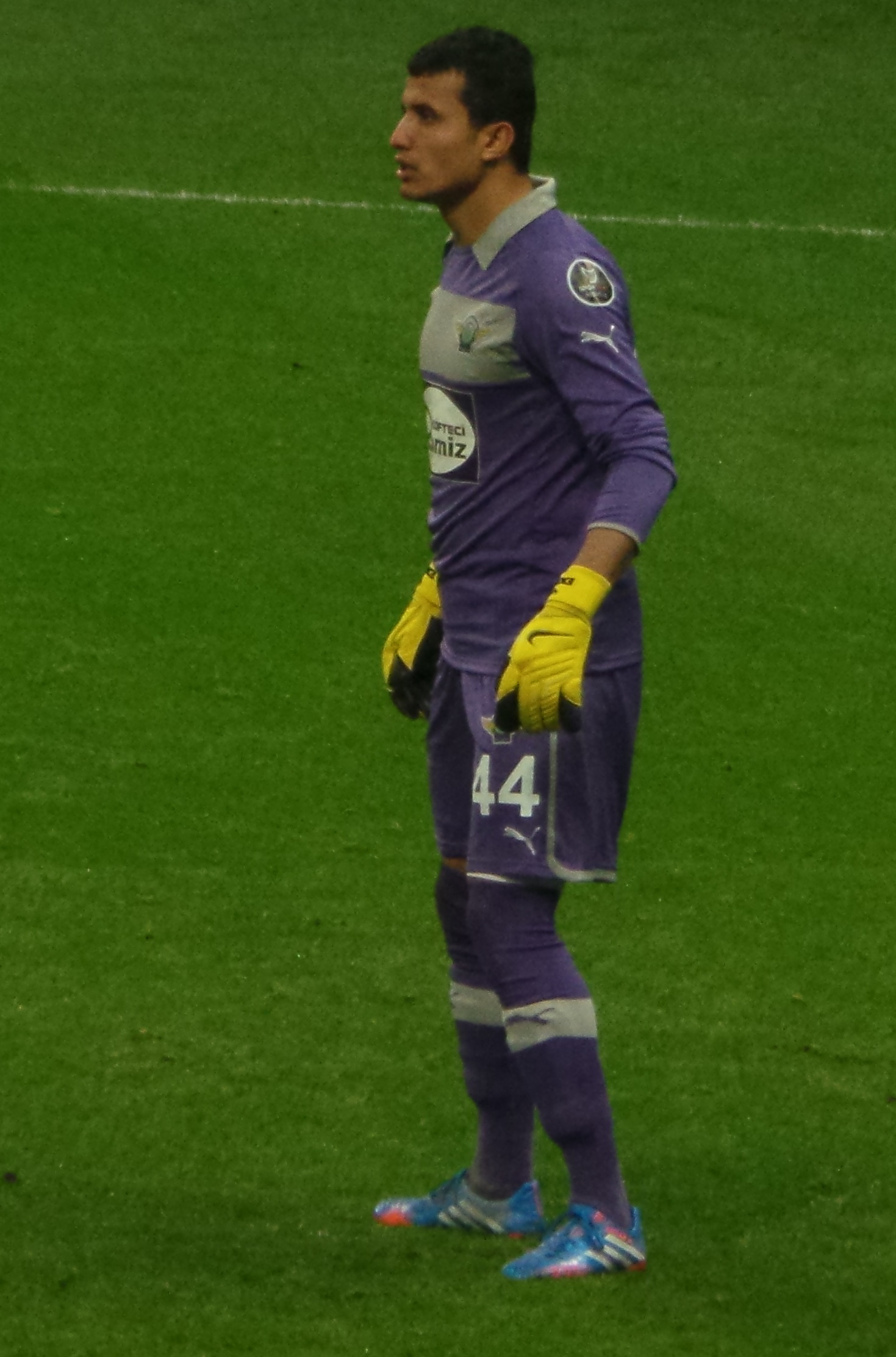

Personal information
- Full name: Emrah Tuncel
- Date of birth: 14 September 1987 (age 39)
- Place of birth: Malatya, Turkey
- Height: 1.86 m (6 ft 1 in)
- Position: Goalkeeper

Team information
- Current team: Adana 1954

Senior career*
Years	Team	Apps	(Gls)
2004–2009	Malatyaspor	52	(0)
2009–2011	Boluspor	6	(0)
2010	→ Adana Demirspor (loan)	16	(0)
2011	Tarsus İdman Yurdu	6	(0)
2011–2015	Akhisar Belediyespor	18	(0)
2016	Şanlıurfaspor	10	(0)
2016–2017	Ankaragücü	15	(0)
2017	Manisaspor	1	(0)
2017–2018	Tuzlaspor	13	(0)
2018–2019	Kahramanmaraşspor	3	(0)
2019–2020	Malatya Yesilyurt Belediyespor	26	(1)
2020–2021	Ceyhanspor	19	(0)
2021–	Adana 1954	2	(0)

International career
2007	Turkey U21	1	(0)
- * Club domestic league appearances and goals as of 21:26, 23 July 2022 (UTC)

Emrah Tuncel (born 14 September 1987) is a Turkish footballer who plays as a goalkeeper for Adana 1954.
