= Zaur Pashayev =

Zaur Pashayev may refer to:

- Zaur Pashayev (judoka) (born 1982), Azerbaijani judoka
- Zaur Pashayev (basketball) (born 1983), Azerbaijani basketball player
