= Jonathan Ruttens =

Belgian footballer

Personal information
- Date of birth: 24 August 1987 (age 39)
- Place of birth: Brussels, Belgium
- Height: 1.88 m (6 ft 2 in)
- Position: Goalkeeper

Senior career*
Years	Team	Apps	(Gls)
2005–2008	Westerlo	3	(0)
2007–2008	→ OH Leuven (loan)	5	(0)
2008–2011	OH Leuven	41	(0)
2011–2013	Heist	38	(0)
- * Club domestic league appearances and goals as of 23 November 2012

Jonathan Ruttens (born 24 August 1987 in Brussels) is a Belgian retired football goalkeeper, who last played for Heist in the Belgian Second Division. After not having his contract extended in 2013, Ruttens opted to quit his career as professional goalkeeper.

== Career ==
Previously, he played three matches for Westerlo in the Belgian Pro League and spent most of his career with OH Leuven in the Belgian Second Division.
