= Vicente Flor =

Spanish footballer

Personal information
- Full name: Vicente Flor Bustos
- Date of birth: 5 November 1987 (age 39)
- Place of birth: Valencia, Spain
- Height: 1.83 m (6 ft 0 in)
- Position: Goalkeeper

Youth career
- Villarreal

Senior career*
Years	Team	Apps	(Gls)
2006–2008	Villarreal C	25	(0)
2006–2007	→ Pego (loan)	17	(0)
2008–2011	Villarreal B	9	(0)
2011	→ Juventud (loan)	5	(0)
2011–2012	Huracán	1	(0)
2012–2013	Alzira	29	(0)
2013	Ontinyent	17	(0)
2014–2016	Alzira	54	(0)

International career
2004	Spain U17	1	(0)
- * Club domestic league appearances and goals as of 9 April 2017

Vicente Flor Bustos (born 5 November 1987 in Valencia) is a Spanish footballer who plays as a goalkeeper.
