= Tomasz Ostalczyk =

Polish footballer

Personal information
- Full name: Tomasz Ostalczyk
- Date of birth: 22 August 1987 (age 39)
- Place of birth: Zgierz, Poland
- Height: 1.80 m (5 ft 11 in)
- Position: Midfielder

Team information
- Current team: Orzeł Kazimierz
- Number: 19

Senior career*
Years	Team	Apps	(Gls)
2004–2005	ŁKS Łódź II		
2005–2009	ŁKS Łódź	19	(0)
2006	→ Korona Kielce II (loan)		
2007	→ Sandecja Nowy Sącz (loan)	11	(2)
2008	→ Tur Turek (loan)	7	(0)
2010	Górnik Polkowice	6	(0)
2010	Tur Turek	16	(0)
2011–2012	Flota Świnoujście	49	(10)
2012–2013	Zawisza Bydgoszcz	17	(2)
2013–2014	Chojniczanka Chojnice	22	(0)
2014	Stal Mielec	3	(0)
2015–2016	ŁKS Łódź	23	(3)
2016–2017	Włókniarz Pabianice		
2017–2021	GKS Ksawerów		
2021–2023	LKS Różyca	16	(3)
2023–	Orzeł Kazimierz	6	(1)
- * Club domestic league appearances and goals as of 23 August 2024

Tomasz Ostalczyk (born 22 August 1987) is a Polish footballer who plays as a midfielder for Orzeł Kazimierz.

== Career ==
=== Club ===
In September 2007, he was loaned to Sandecja Nowy Sącz on a half-year deal.

In February 2010, he signed a contract with Górnik Polkowice.

In July 2010, he joined Tur Turek.

In February 2011, he moved to Flota Świnoujście.

In July 2012, he joined Zawisza Bydgoszcz.

== Honours ==
GKS Ksawerów

- Klasa A Łódź I: 2017–18
