= Javi Salero =

Spanish footballer

Personal information
- Full name: Francisco Javier Lloret Martínez
- Date of birth: 27 February 1987 (age 39)
- Place of birth: Altea, Spain
- Height: 1.62 m (5 ft 4 in)
- Position: Winger

Team information
- Current team: Jove Español

Youth career
- Alicante

Senior career*
Years	Team	Apps	(Gls)
2007–2009	Alicante B		
2009–2011	Alicante	62	(4)
2011–2012	Ontinyent	36	(5)
2012–2013	Huracán	32	(2)
2013–2014	Lucena	32	(2)
2014–2015	Conquense	36	(1)
2015–2017	Novelda	62	(11)
2017–2019	La Nucía	85	(8)
2019–2020	Atzeneta	20	(1)
2021	Racing Murcia	14	(1)
2021–2022	Villajoyosa	24	(0)
2022–	Jove Español	65	(7)
- * Club domestic league appearances and goals as of 13 October 2024

Francisco Javier Lloret Martínez, commonly known as Javi Salero (born 27 February 1987), is a Spanish footballer who plays for Jove Español as a winger.

== Club career ==
Born in Altea, Province of Alicante, Salero finished his graduation with Alicante CF, and made his senior debuts with the reserves in the 2007–08 season. On 6 June 2009, he made his professional debut with the Valencian team, starting in a 1–2 home loss against Hércules CF in the Segunda División; already a full first-team member in the 2010–11 campaign he scored four Segunda División B goals in 32 games, but the club suffered its second relegation in just three years.

Salero played in the third level in the following years, representing Ontinyent CF, Huracán Valencia CF, Lucena CF and UB Conquense.
