= Rolando Barra =

Bolivian football defender (born 1987)

Personal information
- Full name: Rolando Barra Pinedo
- Date of birth: March 10, 1987 (age 39)
- Place of birth: Santa Cruz de la Sierra, Bolivia
- Height: 1.85 m (6 ft 1 in)
- Position: Defender

Team information
- Current team: Sport Boys

Youth career
- 2003–2006: Tahuchi Academy

Senior career*
Years	Team	Apps	(Gls)
2004–2006	Oriente Petrolero	10	(0)
2006–2008	La Paz	15	(0)
2009	The Strongest	5	(0)
2010	La Paz	15	(0)
2010–2012	Oruro Royal	12	(0)
2012–2014	Universitario de Sucre	36	(1)
2014–	Sport Boys		
- * Club domestic league appearances and goals

Rolando Barra (born March 10, 1987) is a Bolivian football defender. He currently plays for Sport Boys in the Liga de Fútbol Profesional Boliviano.
