= Gunnar Hagemann =

Danish philatelist

Gunnar A. Hagemann (1877–1971) was a Danish philatelist who was added to the Roll of Distinguished Philatelists in 1955.
