= Gunnar Kaiser =

German writer and journalist (1976–2023)

Gunnar Kaiser (born 9 June 1976 – 12 October 2023) was a German teacher, writer, political blogger and YouTuber. His critical contributions, especially during the COVID-19 pandemic, are controversial.

== Life ==
Gunnar Kaiser was born in Cologne. He studied philosophy, German philology, and Romance studies at the University of Cologne. After his state examination, he taught German and philosophy at grammar schools in Bonn and Cologne until 2021. In 2021, he gave up his job as a civil servant high school teacher to devote himself entirely to his YouTube channel and his work as an author.

From 2021 onwards, Kaiser wrote articles for the Swiss monthly Der Monat, the Neue Zürcher Zeitung (NZZ), Die Welt, the Jüdische Allgemeine, taz, Berliner Zeitung, Stadtrevue and literaturkritik.de. He also wrote for the Rheinischer Merkur, which was discontinued in 2010.

His first novel, Unter der Haut (Under the Skin), was published in 2018 by Piper Verlag. It has been translated into 6 languages, including French by Fayard (Dans la peau) Greek (Kátō apó to dérma), Italian (Nella pelle), Spanish (Bajo la piel) and Turkish (Derinin altında).

Kaiser ran the cultural blog KaiserTV. Initially, the focus was on literary and philosophical themes. On this YouTube channel, Gunnar Kaiser published several videos per week. Until 2019 his activities stayed largely unnoticed. His videos and blogs just had a few hundred followers. This changed in 2019. He published videos with well-known leaders of the "neue Rechte", such as Martin Sellner, Oliver Janich, Shlomo Finkelstein, Der Schattenmacher and Daniele Ganser. The collaboration with this scene, conspiracy theories and his videos against COVID-19-countermeasures subsequently led to a certain notoriety in this scene. Kaiser worked at the mediaportal Apolut, the successor to the KenFM portal, which is monitored by the "Verfassungsschutz".

On July 10, 2021, Kaiser's YouTube channel was blocked without giving any specific reasons. On July 13, the 28th Civil Chamber of the Regional Court of Cologne issued a preliminary injunction against the block, saying YouTube had to specifically break down violations of guidelines. In 2022, he reached 258 000 subscribers.

The non-fiction book Der Kult (The Cult), published by Rubikon Verlag at the end of January 2022, which describes the alleged transformation of Germany into a totalitarian state by means of the Corona measures, reached number 2 on the Spiegel bestseller list and number 13 on the bestseller list of the Börsenblatt in February 1 in the category of non-fiction (paperback). This was followed in mid-March 2022 by the anti-vaccination non-fiction book Ethics of Vaccination by Europa Verlag, which shortly afterwards took 15th place on the Spiegel bestseller list in the non-fiction/hardcover category.

He was diagnosed with cancer in 2022 and died of cancer on 12 October 2023, at the age of 47.

== Literary work ==
Kaiser's first novel, Unter der Haut (English: Under The Skin), was published in 2018. The paperback edition was printed by German publishing house Piper.

== Positions and criticism ==
Milosz Matuschek (*1980, guest author at NZZ and Schweizer Monat) said that Gunnar Kaiser has summed up the contradictions of the government measures surrounding funerals, schools, companies and restaurants by comparing them to anti-racism demonstrations in June 2020. Matuschek saw this as a colossal triumph in favor of skeptics of the danger of COVID-19. Matuschek was a close private friend of Kaiser and they did several projects together, like "Appell für freie Debattenräume". After this article, NZZ stopped the short cooperation with both of them.

In 2021 Martin Rhonheimer in the NZZ Newspaper wrote "Kaiser is on a very wrong way" and attested him and his positions to be ideology-driven while criticising the Identitarian Movement.

Kaiser and Matuschek published the "Appell für freie Debattenräume" (appeal for free debate spaces) about cancel culture and call-out culture. A copy of an American paper. In Kaiser's opinion, cancel culture was about "using threats, threats of violence, actual violence, bullying or shitstorms" to put people under pressure and force them out of the public debate, with perpetrators often remaining anonymous. Often third parties such as organizers, publishers, employers, and platforms were allegedly put under pressure to make people seem unacceptable and remove them from public discourse. This new quality was seen by Kaiser as a mix of "exuberant political correctness" towards art and culture and the lack of protest against it, with every kind of protest being politically stigmatized and marginalized.

After moderating a debate on cancel culture for the Friedrich Naumann Foundation (affiliated with the German liberal party FDP), the foundation opened discussions by questioning Kaiser for "spreading conspiracy theories that belong to the mindset of right-wing populism". – an attitude by the liberal foundation that was noticed in a highly controversial manner. Kaiser appeared in this Video as "Dr. Kaiser", a NZZ Journalist and writer, while he was just a simple teacher at this time.

Gunnar Kaiser spoke at protests against protective measures taken against COVID-19 ("Querdenken").

== Bibliography (selection) ==
Non-fictional

- With Florian Radvan: Ödön von Horváth: Geschichten aus dem Wiener Wald [...] Kopiervorlagen und Module für Unterrichtssequenzen edited by Dieter Wrobel, R. Oldenbourg-Verlag 2010. ISBN 978-3-637-01061-1
- Wie konnte es nur so weit kommen?, Sodenkamp & Lenz Verlagshaus 2021 ISBN 978-3982274539
- Der Kult, Rubikon Verlag, 2022 ISBN 978-3-96789-028-0
- Die Ethik des Impfens: Über die Wiedergewinnung der Mündigkeit. Europa Verlag 2022 ISBN 978-3-95890-504-7

Fictional

- Unter der Haut. Novel. Berlin Verlag 2018 ISBN 978-3-827-01375-0
