= Fumaça (footballer, born 1987) =

Brazilian footballer

Personal information
- Full name: Jonatha Alves da Silva
- Date of birth: April 4, 1987 (age 39)
- Place of birth: Anápolis, Brazil
- Height: 1.75 m (5 ft 9 in)
- Position: Forward

Senior career*
| Years | Team | Apps | (Gls) |
| 2007–2013 | Iraty | | |
| 2008–2009 | → Gaziantep BB (loan) | | |
| 2009–2010 | → Madureira (loan) | | |
| 2010 | → Nacional de Uberaba (loan) | | |
| 2011 | → Ferroviário (loan) | | |
| 2011 | → Anapolina (loan) | | |
| 2011 | → Avaí (loan) | | |
| 2012 | → Rio Claro (loan) | | |
| 2013 | → Central (loan) | | |
| 2014 | Rio Branco-PR | | |
| 2014 | Coritiba | | |
| 2015 | Avenida | | |
| 2015 | Rio Branco-PR | | |
| 2015 | Nacional-AM | | |
| 2016 | Jacuipense | | |
| 2016 | Freipaulistano | | |
| 2017 | Independente de Limeira | | |
| 2017 | Itaberaí | | |
| 2018 | CRAC | | |
| 2019 | Anapolina | | |
- * Club domestic league appearances and goals

Jonatha Alves da Silva (born April 4, 1987) is a Brazilian former footballer.

In the Turkish 1. Lig he made thirteen games and scored against Adanaspor.

== Honours ==
Nacional

- Campeonato Amazonense: 2015

Freipaulistano

- Campeonato Sergipano Série A2: 2016

CRAC

- Campeonato Goiano Second Division: 2018
