= Dejan Marijanovič =

Slovenian footballer

Personal information
- Full name: Dejan Marijanovič
- Date of birth: 2 January 1987 (age 39)
- Place of birth: SFR Yugoslavia
- Position: Forward

Team information
- Current team: UFM Monfalcone

Senior career*
Years	Team	Apps	(Gls)
2004–2006	HIT Gorica	39	(17)
2006	Adria	11	(3)
2007	Brda	10	(1)
2007–2008	Tolmin	20	(0)
2008–2010	Primorje	26	(3)
2010	→ Tolmin (loan)	10	(13)
2010–2011	Koper	16	(2)
2011–2012	Belluno 1905	28	(14)
2012–2013	Trissino-Valdagno	26	(8)
2013	Virtus Verona	1	(1)
2013–2014	Albese	27	(20)
2014–2016	OltrepòVoghera	51	(26)
2016–2017	Lentigione	30	(9)
2017–2018	Clodiense	20	(2)
2018–2019	Chions	20	(3)
2019–2020	Brian Lignano Calcio		
2020–2021	Pro Gorizia		
2021	Kras Repen		
2022–	UFM Monfalcone		
- * Club domestic league appearances and goals as of 14:32, 18 November 2019 (UTC)

Dejan Marijanovič (born 2 January 1987) is a Slovenian footballer, who is currently playing for Italian Promozione side UFM Monfalcone.

== Career ==
In July 2017, Marijanovič Clodiense in the Italian Serie D. In the following year, he moved to APC Chions, before joining Brian Lignano Calcio in the summer 2019.
