= Gunnar Andersson (politician) =

Finnish politician (1896–1956)

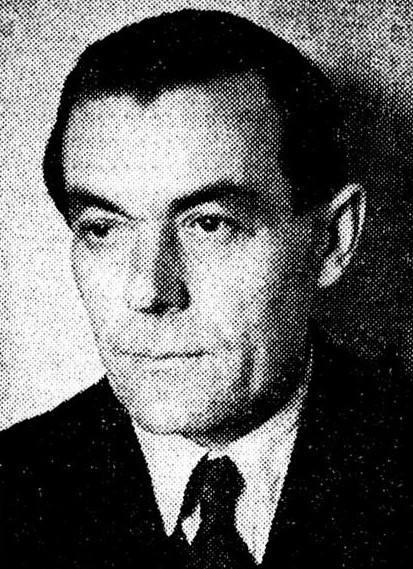
Gunnar Andersson in 1948

Sven Gunnar Andersson (18 February 1896 in Porvoo — 1 January 1956) was a Finnish turner, trade union functionary and politician. He was a member of the Parliament of Finland from 1933 to 1951, representing the Social Democratic Party of Finland (SDP). During the Continuation War, he was one of the signatories of the "Petition of the Thirty-three", which members of the Peace opposition presented to President Ryti on 20 August 1943.
