= Danny Munyao =

Zambian footballer (born 1987)

Personal information
- Full name: Danny Munyao
- Date of birth: 2 November 1987 (age 38)
- Place of birth: Zambia
- Height: 5 ft 2 in (1.57 m)
- Position: Goalkeeper

Team information
- Current team: Red Arrows
- Number: 1

Senior career*
Years	Team	Apps	(Gls)
2007–2009	Red Arrows		
2010	Zanaco		
2011–	Red Arrows		

International career^{‡}
2013–	Zambia	18	(0)
- * Club domestic league appearances and goals as of 22 November 2014 ‡ National team caps and goals as of 21 June 2018

Danny Munyao (born 2 November 1987) is a Zambian football goalkeeper currently playing for Red Arrows F.C. in the Zambian Premier League.

== Club career ==
His football career began at Red Arrows F.C. in 2007. He appeared for them in the Zambian Premier League and also won the Zambian Cup. In 2010, he made a move to Zanaco F.C. before returning to Red Arrows in 2011.

== International career ==
Munyao's first call-up to the Zambian team was to the 2013 Africa Cup of Nations roster. He has since appeared in nine international matches for Zambia, including in 2014 FIFA World Cup qualification and 2015 Africa Cup of Nations qualification.
