= François Keller =

French footballer and coach (born 1973)

Personal information
- Date of birth: 27 October 1973 (age 53)
- Place of birth: Colmar, France
- Position: Utility player

Senior career*
Years	Team	Apps	(Gls)
?–1995	Colmar		
1995–1998	Strasbourg	61	(8)
1998–1999	Fulham	1	(0)
1999–2003	Strasbourg B	118	(7)

Managerial career
- 2003–2011: Strasbourg B
- 2011–2014: Strasbourg
- 2014–: Strasbourg (director)
- 2016–2020: Strasbourg B
- * Club domestic league appearances and goals

François Keller (born 27 October 1973) is a French former professional footballer who now works as head coach of Strasbourg B in his home country.

== Playing career ==
Keller started his senior career with Colmar. During compulsory national service he captained the French army team. in November 1998, he trialled with Fulham of the Football League Second Division before signing a contract in December. Fulham paid a transfer fee of £ 30,000 to Strasbourg. He made two appearances for Fulham. After that, he played for French club Strasbourg B before retiring in 2003.

== Post-playing career ==
Keller was replaced by Jacky Duguépéroux as Strasbourg coach in March 2014. At the time, Strasbourg were in danger of being relegated from the Championnat National, being five points adrift of non-relegation places with eight games left and having lost 12 matches in 26 games.

In May 2014 he was appointed head of Strasbourg's training centre by his brother Marc Keller.

== Personal life ==
Keller's brother Marc also played football professionally.
