= Gunnar Hauk Gjengset =

Norwegian philologist and author (born 1946)

Gunnar Hauk Gjengset (born May 10, 1946) is a Norwegian philologist and author.

Gjengset was arrested in the Soviet Union in January 1970 for demonstrating against the Brezhnev regime. Gjengset had traveled to Leningrad in order to distribute leaflets supporting the release of author Yuri Galanskov and war hero Pyotr Grigorenko, both known dissidents. In the trial that followed, Gjengset was sentenced to one year of imprisonment, but was freed after one month of internment due to international pressure. He later wrote the book, Under jernteppet (Behind The Iron Curtain) about the experience.

Gjengset has a Ph.D. in comparative literature from Umeå University in Sweden, with a dissertation on the Sami author, Matti Aikio (Matti Aikio - verk og virke, Umeå 2011). Gjengset has written several books, including a biography of Gustav Vigeland.

He is also an aphorist with a daily column, Dagens sukk (Sigh of the Day) in the national Norwegian newspaper Klassekampen, under the pseudonym, Hauk, which is also a middle name. The column had earlier appeared in the Trondheim, Norway, newspaper Adresseavisen for more than 20 years.

In the book, Avoid the Void (2013), produced by the New York-based publisher, Morgan James Publishers, Gjengset discusses alcoholism.

Several of Gjengset's plays have been presented at Det Åpne Teater (The Open Theater) in Oslo. Together with Harald Gaski he has written Johan Turi, a play about the author, Johan Turi, who wrote the world's first fictional book in a Sámi language. This play was staged on Det Norske Teater in Oslo, and opened on September 6, 2017. In October 2019, the play will be part of Norway's official presentation as guest of honor at this year's international book fair in Frankfurt, Germany.
