= Damien Moulin =

French footballer (born 1987)

Personal information
- Date of birth: 3 January 1987 (age 39)
- Place of birth: Chaulgnes, France
- Height: 1.83 m (6 ft 0 in)
- Position: Defender

Team information
- Current team: FC Côte Bleue

Senior career*
Years	Team	Apps	(Gls)
2005–2007	Saint-Étienne B	37	(0)
2007–2010	Louhans-Cuiseaux	88	(1)
2010–2011	Fréjus Saint-Raphaël	32	(0)
2011–2012	Vannes	25	(1)
2012–2013	Istres	13	(0)
2013–2016	Fréjus Saint-Raphaël	25	(0)
2016–2017	Mulhouse		
2017–2018	Annecy		
2017–2018	Istres		
2019–	FC Côte Bleue		
- * Club domestic league appearances and goals as of 1 January 2019

Damien Moulin (born 3 January 1987) is a French professional footballer who currently plays as a defender for FC Côte Bleue.

== Career ==
After a long career playing amateur football (including 147 leagues matches in Championnat National), Moulin signed a professional contract with FC Istres in 2012.
