= Rizvan Pashayev =

Azerbaijani mathematician

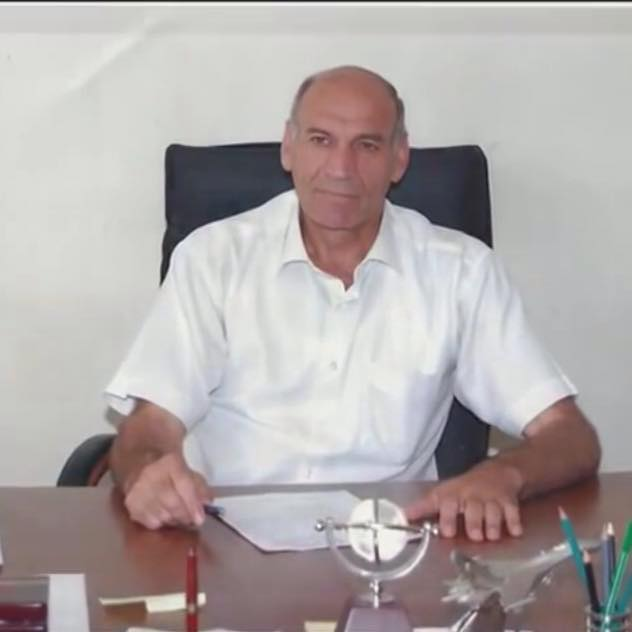

Rizvan Pashayev (December 25, 1949 in the village of Tatar of Qubadli District – 2007?) was an Azerbaijani mathematician who was the author of more than 80 scientific works including six textbooks. In 2002 he was named as the newly created Director of Economic Information. In 2005, he was made dean of the Applied Mathematics and Cybernetics Faculty. Under his direction five students earned the title of Physics-Mathematics candidate of science, the degree of sciences.

== Life ==
He finished school in Zengilan. Between 1968 and 1974 he studied at Baku State University, Faculty of Mechanism and Mathematics. After graduation he worked in a faculty of Applied Mathematics and Cybernetics. At first he started his working career as the director of an arithmetic machinery laboratory, then as a teacher, headmaster, associated professor and full professor.

In 1981 he defended his nomination dissertation, becoming a Physics-Mathematics candidate of science. In 1998–2000 he was chosen dean of the Applied Mathematics and Cybernetics faculty.

In 1998, he defended his doctoral dissertation at Novosibirsk State University in Russia, earning his Physics-Mathematics Sciences doctorate degree.

Pashayev's services were evaluated highly. He was awarded diplomas by the Ministry of Education and BSU repeatedly. In 2000 he was awarded the "Progress" medal with ordinance of president.
