= Osman Mohammed =

Sudanese footballer

Personal information
- Full name: Osman Mohammed Osman Saleh
- Date of birth: 25 December 1987 (age 38)
- Place of birth: Khartoum, Sudan
- Height: 1.82 m (5 ft 11 1/2 in)
- Position: Defender

Senior career*
Years	Team	Apps	(Gls)
2010–2014	Al-Khor		
2014–2015	El Jaish		
2015–2017	Qatar SC		
2017	Al Ahli		
- * Club domestic league appearances and goals

Osman Mohammed (Arabic: عثمان محمد) (born 25 September 1987) is a Sudanese footballer. He played in the Qatar Stars League for Qatar SC.
