= Gunnar Fløystad =

Norwegian politician

Gunnar Fløystad (22 May 1902 – 10 January 1977) was a Norwegian politician for the Centre Party.

He served as a deputy representative to the Parliament of Norway from Aust-Agder during the term 1961–1965. In total he met during 14 days of parliamentary session.
