= Justo Nguema =

Equatoguinean football manager

Personal information
- Full name: Justo Nguema Nchama Ntutum
- Date of birth: 3 December 1987 (age 38)
- Place of birth: Mongomo, Equatorial Guinea
- Height: 1.70 m (5 ft 7 in)
- Position: Midfielder

Senior career*
Years	Team	Apps	(Gls)
2006	Renacimiento		
2007–2008	Akonangui		
2009–2014	Sony de Elá Nguema		

International career^{‡}
2006–2009	Equatorial Guinea	5	(0)
- * Club domestic league appearances and goals as of 30 April 2009 ‡ National team caps and goals as of 30 April 2009

Justo Nguema Nchama Ntutum (born 3 December 1987), also known as Papu, is an Equatorial Guinean football manager and former player who played as a midfielder for the Equatorial Guinea national team.

== Club career ==
Nguema plays for Sony de Elá Nguema in the Equatoguinean Premier League.

== Personal life ==
Nguema is a brother of late football manager and player Théodore Zué Nguema, who represented Gabon internationally.
