= Adriano (footballer, born December 1987) =

Brazilian footballer

Personal information
- Full name: Adriano José de Lara
- Date of birth: December 9, 1987 (age 38)
- Place of birth: União da Vitória, Brazil
- Height: 1.85 m (6 ft 1 in)
- Position: Right-back

Team information
- Current team: Maringá

Senior career*
Years	Team	Apps	(Gls)
2006–2008	Corinthians Paranaense	0	(0)
2009	Coritiba	0	(0)
2009–2010	Rio Ave	18	(1)
2010–2014	Atlético Goianiense	25	(1)
2012–2013	→ Atlético Paranaense (loan)		
2015–2016	Paraná		
2016–	Maringá		
- * Club domestic league appearances and goals as of 6 February 2016

Adriano José Lara (born December 9, 1987), better known as Adriano, is a Brazilian professional footballer who plays as a right-back for Maringá.

== Career ==
Adriano served from 2006 to 2008 in the J. Malucelli (current Paranaense Corinthians), where he became champion of the Copa Paraná in 2007. In early 2009 he went to Coritiba and eventually moved to Rio Ave, club Portugal. Currently, Adriano plays for Clube Atlético Paranaense on loan from Atletico Goianiense.

== Honours ==
Maringá

- Taça FPF: 2017
