= Marvin Ellmann =

German footballer

Personal information
- Date of birth: 21 September 1987 (age 39)
- Place of birth: Duisburg, West Germany
- Height: 1.83 m (6 ft 0 in)
- Position: Striker

Team information
- Current team: SV Hönnepel-Niedermörmter
- Number: 9

Youth career
- –2006: SuS Dinslaken
- 2006–2007: TuRa 88 Duisburg
- 2007–2009: Duisberger SV 1900

Senior career*
Years	Team	Apps	(Gls)
2009–2012	Rot-Weiß Oberhausen II	71	(56)
2010–2012	Rot-Weiß Oberhausen	27	(3)
2012–2013	Rot-Weiss Essen	31	(3)
2013–2016	Wuppertaler SV	90	(56)
2016–2017	Ratingen 04/19	17	(7)
2017–2020	Schwarz-Weiß Essen	80	(51)
2020–	SV Hönnepel-Niedermörmter	8	(6)
- * Club domestic league appearances and goals as of 13 January 2021

Marvin Ellmann (born 21 September 1987) is a German footballer who plays as a striker for SV Hönnepel-Niedermörmter. 2017/18 he was the best goalgetter in the Oberliga Niederrhein.
