= Rene Carter =

Caymanian footballer

Personal information
- Full name: Mario Rene Funes Carter
- Date of birth: 23 July 1987 (age 39)
- Place of birth: Cayman Islands
- Position: Midfielder

Team information
- Current team: Elite SC

Senior career*
Years	Team	Apps	(Gls)
2007–2008	Scholars International		
2008–	Elite SC		

International career^{‡}
2008–2011	Cayman Islands	13	(1)
- * Club domestic league appearances and goals ‡ National team caps and goals as of 23:16, 10 April 2012 (UTC)

Mario Rene Carter (born 23 July 1987) is a Caymanian footballer who plays as a midfielder. He has represented the Cayman Islands during World Cup qualifying matches in 2008 and 2011, and in the 2010 Caribbean Championship.

== Career statistics ==
=== International ===
Appearances and goals by national team and year
National team	Year	Apps	Goals
Cayman Islands	2008	8	0
Cayman Islands	2009	1	1
Cayman Islands	2010	3	0
Cayman Islands	2011	1	0
Total		13	1

Scores and results list the Cayman Islands' goal tally first, score column indicates score after each Carter goal.

List of international goals scored by Rene Carter
No.	Date	Venue	Opponent	Score	Result	Competition
1	28 June 2009	Truman Bodden Sports Complex, George Town, Cayman Islands	Jamaica	1–1	1–4	Friendly
