= Gunnar Blomström =

Swedish footballer

Senior career*
Years	Team	Apps	(Gls)
- Djurgården
- * Club domestic league appearances and goals

Gunnar Blomström is a Swedish retired footballer. Blomström made 21 Allsvenskan appearances for Djurgården and scored 4 goals.
