= Giorgio Conrotto =

Italian footballer

Personal information
- Date of birth: 15 April 1987 (age 39)
- Place of birth: Chieri, Italy
- Height: 1.81 m (5 ft 11 in)
- Position: Defender

Team information
- Current team: Saluzzo

Senior career*
Years	Team	Apps	(Gls)
2005–2006	Giaveno	55	(0)
2006–2008	Pizzighettone	31	(0)
2007	→ Inter Milan (loan)	0	(0)
2008–2011	Canavese	90	(2)
2011–2014	Chieri	80	(6)
2014–2018	Cuneo	127	(6)
2018–2019	Caratese	11	(0)
2019–2022	Chieri	123	(5)
2022–2025	Chisola	88	(4)
2025–	Saluzzo	30	(1)
- * Club domestic league appearances and goals as of 25 June 2026

Giorgio Conrotto (born 15 April 1987) is an Italian footballer who plays for Serie D club Saluzzo.

== Club career ==
He also briefly played for Inter Milan Youth Sector in the second half of 2006–07 season.

On 17 July 2014 Conrotto was signed by Serie D club Cuneo.
