= William España =

Ecuadorian footballer (born 1987)

Personal information
- Full name: Oswaldo William España
- Date of birth: February 1, 1987 (age 39)
- Place of birth: Guayaquil, Ecuador
- Height: 1.65 m (5 ft 5 in)
- Position: Wing back

Team information
- Current team: Deportivo Cuenca
- Number: 21

Senior career*
Years	Team	Apps	(Gls)
2007–2008	Emelec	0	(0)
2009–2011	Deportivo Cuenca	21	(0)
2011	Macará		
2012	U Loja		
2012	Mushuc Runa		
2013	Deportivo Azogues		
2014	Deportivo Quito	30	(0)
2015	Portoviejo		
- * Club domestic league appearances and goals

Oswaldo William España (born 1 February 1987) is an Ecuadorian footballer.
