= Marco André =

Portuguese footballer

Personal information
- Full name: Marco André Baptista Freitas
- Date of birth: 31 July 1987 (age 39)
- Place of birth: Paços de Ferreira, Portugal
- Height: 1.80 m (5 ft 11 in)
- Position: Defender

Team information
- Current team: Freamunde
- Number: 17

Youth career
- 2000–2006: Paços de Ferreira

Senior career*
Years	Team	Apps	(Gls)
2006–2007	Águias de Eiriz		
2007–2008	Leões Seroa		
2008–2009	Citânia de Sanfins		
2009–2010	Rebordosa		
2010–2011	Aliados Lordelo		
2011–2013	Gondomar	57	(3)
2013–2014	Famalicão	31	(1)
2014–2015	Desportivo das Aves	5	(0)
2015–2016	AD Oliveirense	30	(1)
2016–2017	Fafe	10	(0)
2017–2018	Aliança de Gandra	29	(3)
2018–2020	Tirsense	48	(7)
2020–	Freamunde	7	(1)
- * Club domestic league appearances and goals as of 21:06, 25 January 2021 (UTC)

Marco André Baptista Freitas, known as Marco André (born 31 July 1987) is a Portuguese football player who plays for S.C. Freamunde.

== Club career ==
He made his professional debut in the Segunda Liga for Desportivo das Aves on 13 September 2014 in a game against Leixões.
