= Gunārs Ķirsons =

Latvian businessman (born 1951)

- Born: 17 May 1951 (72 years old); Omsk
- Citizenship: Russia; Latvia
- Occupations: entrepreneur businessman

Gunārs Ķirsons (born 17 May 1951, in Omsk) is a Latvian entrepreneur, businessman and founder of the Latvian Lido chain of restaurants. He is also the president of the Latvian Judo Federation.

== Biography ==
His father, Alberts Ķirsons, was a successful farmer during the first Republic of Latvia. In 1959, he returned to Latvia with his family from Soviet deportation. He studied at Riga’s 17th Vocational Technical School, Murjāņi Sports School, the woodcraft department of an art school, and Riga’s 23rd Evening Shift Secondary School, from which he graduated in 1972.

From 1968 to 1975, he worked as a carpenter, locksmith, and design technician. He also worked as a bartender at the restaurants “Ruse” (1975–1990) and “Ščecina.” In 1987, Ķirsons founded the cooperative "Lido" and served as its director until 1991. That same year, he opened the first Lido bar in Riga on Lāčplēša Street. In 1991, he became the owner of the company Lido, building the largest restaurant chain in Latvia. In 2005, he established the company "Zaļā zeme Lido," which is engaged in real estate.

He has been a three-time Latvian champion in sambo and is also a Baltic states champion. He holds a black belt in judo, although he initially trained in athletics, specifically javelin throw. In 2005, he founded the judo club “Lido” and serves as its president. In 2009, he was elected chairman of the board of the Latvian Judo Federation (no English article).

In 2000, he was awarded the Order of the Three Stars, 5th Class.

In 2025, he resigned from the board of the company Lido, retaining a 4% shareholding. That same year, he founded the catering company “Daba GK” and, through the company RIC, purchased a café in Mežaparks.
