= Gunnar Eliassen =

Norwegian athlete and wrestler

Gunnar Normann Eliassen (24 April 1907 – 23 September 1971) was a Norwegian athlete and wrestler.

He was born in Bærum, and worked for about forty years at the paper factory Granfos Bruk. He was awarded the Society for Development medal for longstanding service. He also lived in Bærum.

As a sportsman he represented the clubs Stabekk AIL, Lilleaker IF and IL Liull. In amateur wrestling he took a national "middleweight B" (a slightly different weight class than middleweight A) title in 1936, but also finished as a runner-up nine times. His main claim to fame was winning a bronze medal at the 1937 Workers' Olympiad. In athletics, he specialized in the high jump and was the runner-up at the Norwegian Workers' Championships at one occasion.

Eliassen's political activism led to his imprisonment in Bredtveit concentration camp during the occupation of Norway by Nazi Germany from 6 February to 11 March 1942. In April 1940, he had served at Oscarsborg Fortress when German cruiser Blücher was sunk by the cannons there. He died in September 1971 and was buried at Ullern Church.
