= Adam Berner =

Swedish footballer

Personal information
- Date of birth: 25 January 1987 (age 39)
- Place of birth: Bromölla, Sweden
- Height: 1.75 m (5 ft 9 in)
- Position: Striker

Youth career
- 2004–2005: IFÖ Bromölla IF

Senior career*
Years	Team	Apps	(Gls)
2006–2012	Mjällby AIF	74	(10)
2014–2016	Kristianstad	28	(1)
- * Club domestic league appearances and goals

Adam Berner (born 25 January 1987) is a Swedish former footballer.
