= Serdar Güneş =

Turkish footballer (born 1987)

Personal information
- Full name: Serdar Güneş
- Date of birth: 24 June 1987 (age 39)
- Place of birth: Berlin-Kreuzberg, West Germany
- Height: 1.82 m (6 ft 0 in)
- Position: Midfielder

Team information
- Current team: Anadoluspor Berlin

Youth career
- –2006: Tennis Borussia Berlin

Senior career*
Years	Team	Apps	(Gls)
2006–2007	Berliner AK 07	12	(2)
2007–2010	Ankaraspor A.Ş.	7	(2)
2007	→ Karşıyaka S.K. (loan)		
2008	→ İzmirspor (loan)		
2008	→ Fatih Karagümrük (loan)	15	(1)
2010	Türkiyemspor Berlin	0	(0)
2010	Tennis Borussia Berlin	10	(0)
2011	BSV Hürtürkel		
2011–2012	Tennis Borussia Berlin	16	(2)
2013–2015	CFC Hertha 06		
2015–	Türkyurt 1989 Berlin	39	(25)
2018–	Anadoluspor Berlin	90.	(1 ownGoal)

Managerial career
- 2015: CFC Hertha 06 (player-assistant)
- * Club domestic league appearances and goals as of 1 July 2012

Serdar Güneş (born 24 June 1987) is a Turkish footballer who was born in Berlin-Kreuzberg, West Germany. He plays for Türkyurt 1989 Berlin.
