= Gunnar Jacobson =

Swedish modern pentathlete

Personal information
- Born: 5 April 1948 (age 78) Uppsala, Sweden

Sport
- Sport: Modern pentathlon

Gunnar Jacobson (born 5 April 1948) is a Swedish modern pentathlete. He competed at the 1976 Summer Olympics.
