= Gunnar Handal =

Norwegian educationalist

Gunnar Handal (born 25 March 1936) is a Norwegian educationalist.

He was born in Bergen. He took the mag.art. degree in pedagogy at the University of Oslo in 1964, but was hired at Pedagogisk forskningsintstitutt (now: the Department of Education) at the University of Oslo already in 1963. From 1992 to his retirement he served as professor of university pedagogy. He had then led the "Study Quality Committee" from 1989 to 1990, which highlighted quality in university studies. In 2003 he was awarded the Kristian Ottosen Prize for promoting student welfare.

He resides at Grav.
