= Gunnar Høverstad =

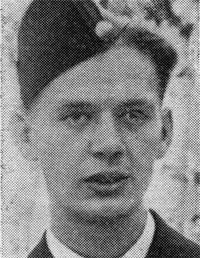
- Born: February 13, 1922; Asker, Norway
- Died: December 3, 1943 (aged 21); Germany
- Occupation: Pilot

Gunnar Høverstad (February 13, 1922 – December 3, 1943) was a Norwegian bomber pilot with the rank of lieutenant during the Second World War.

Høverstad was born in Asker, the son of the historian Torstein Høverstad and Margit Johanne née Knutsen. Høverstad was trained to fly in Canada, and he carried out about 30 bombing missions with a Handley Page Halifax bomber over Germany. On a mission with No. 35 Squadron RAF against Berlin, his aircraft caught fire after being hit by German anti-aircraft fire on December 3, 1943. Høverstad kept the aircraft in the air while the crew of six escaped by parachuting. He was killed because it was too late for him to bail out.

In the Council of State on November 7, 1947, Lieutenant Gunnar Høvstad was posthumously awarded the War Cross with Sword for "heroic efforts on the night of December 2, 1943, during an attack on Berlin."
