= Gunnar Henningsson =

Swedish poet, idealist and teacher

Gunnar Henningsson, (15 April 1895 - 21 October 1960) was a Swedish poet, idealist and teacher. Gunnar Henningsson has published the collections of poems "En ungkarl på landet", "Ragnarök" and "Dikter 1928-1950" and also the prose stories "Grävlingarna och hans grannar" and "Harstigar och svampmarker". He was also a contributor in Scandinavian papers and in American and Swedish-American papers and also in educational journals and magazines.

Works published by Gunnar Henningsson

- En ungkarl på landet (1928)
- Ragnarök (1935)
- Grävlingen och hans grannar (1938)
- Harstigar och svampmarker (1942)
- Dikter 1928-1950 (1951)
