= Ján Nemček =

Slovak footballer

Personal information
- Date of birth: 9 October 1987 (age 39)
- Place of birth: Czechoslovakia
- Position: Attacking midfielder

Team information
- Current team: FC Petržalka 1898
- Number: 10

Senior career*
Years	Team	Apps	(Gls)
2005–2009	Slovan Bratislava		
2007	→ Senec (loan)		
2009–2010	Hradec Králové	26	(0)
2010–2011	→FK Bodva (loan)	16	(0)
2011–2012	Pezinok		
2012	FC Stadlau		
2013–	LP Domino		
2013–	→ FC Petržalka 1898 (loan)		
- * Club domestic league appearances and goals as of 8 August 2013

Ján Nemček (born 9 October 1987) is a Slovak football player who currently plays for FC Petržalka 1898. His former club were the Slovak 3. liga club PŠC Pezinok and Austrian FC Stadlau, also FK Bodva and SK Hradec Králové.
