= Gunnar Grendstad =

Norwegian political scientist (born 1960)

Gunnar Grendstad (born 1 May 1960 in Kristiansand) is a Norwegian political scientist and professor at the University of Bergen. He has researched methodological aspects of political science and American politics, and specializes on judicial behavior on the Supreme Court of Norway. He has been a visiting fellow at the University of California, Berkeley and Purdue University.
