= Saad Hosny =

Egyptian footballer (born 1987)

Personal information
- Date of birth: 1 January 1987
- Place of birth: Cairo, Egypt
- Height: 1.68 m (5 ft 6 in)
- Position: Right back

Team information
- Current team: Suez

Senior career*
Years	Team	Apps	(Gls)
2006–2008	Baladeye		
2009–2015	El Gouna	65	(14)
2015–2018	Ismaily	20	(1)
2017	→ Gaish (loan)	7	(0)
2018	Tanta	3	(0)
2018–	Suez		
- * Club domestic league appearances and goals as of 23:41, 5 September 2019 (UTC)

Saad Hosny (born 1 January 1987) is an Egyptian footballer currently playing as a right back with Egyptian Second Division club Suez SC.
