= Kåre Björkstrand =

Finnish footballer (born 1987)

Personal information
- Full name: Kåre Björkstrand
- Date of birth: 31 March 1987 (age 39)
- Place of birth: Sipoo, Finland
- Height: 1.90 m (6 ft 3 in)
- Positions: Defender; midfielder

Youth career
- 2001–2004: KPV
- 2004: TP Kaarle

Senior career*
Years	Team	Apps	(Gls)
2005–2007	GBK	68	(13)
2008	VIFK	23	(1)
2009	FC Kiisto	15	(2)
2010	FF Jaro	22	(3)
2011	FC Viikingit	21	(0)
2013	Vasa IFK	23	(9)
- * Club domestic league appearances and goals as of 2 August 2010

Kåre Björkstrand (born 31 March 1987) is a Finnish footballer who last played for Finnish Veikkausliiga club FF Jaro.

== Personal life ==
He is the identical twin brother of Sebastian Björkstrand and brother of Sixten Björkstrand.
