= Reidun Gunnarson =

Norwegian handball player

Personal information
- Nationality: Norwegian

Sport
- Sport: Handball
National team
Years	Team	Apps	(Gls)
1989–1991	Norway	35	(38)

Reidun Gunnarson is a Norwegian handball player. She played 35 matches for the national handball team from 1989 to 1991, and participated at the 1990 World Women's Handball Championship, where the Norwegian team placed sixth.
