= Gunnar Haraldsen =

Faroese footballer

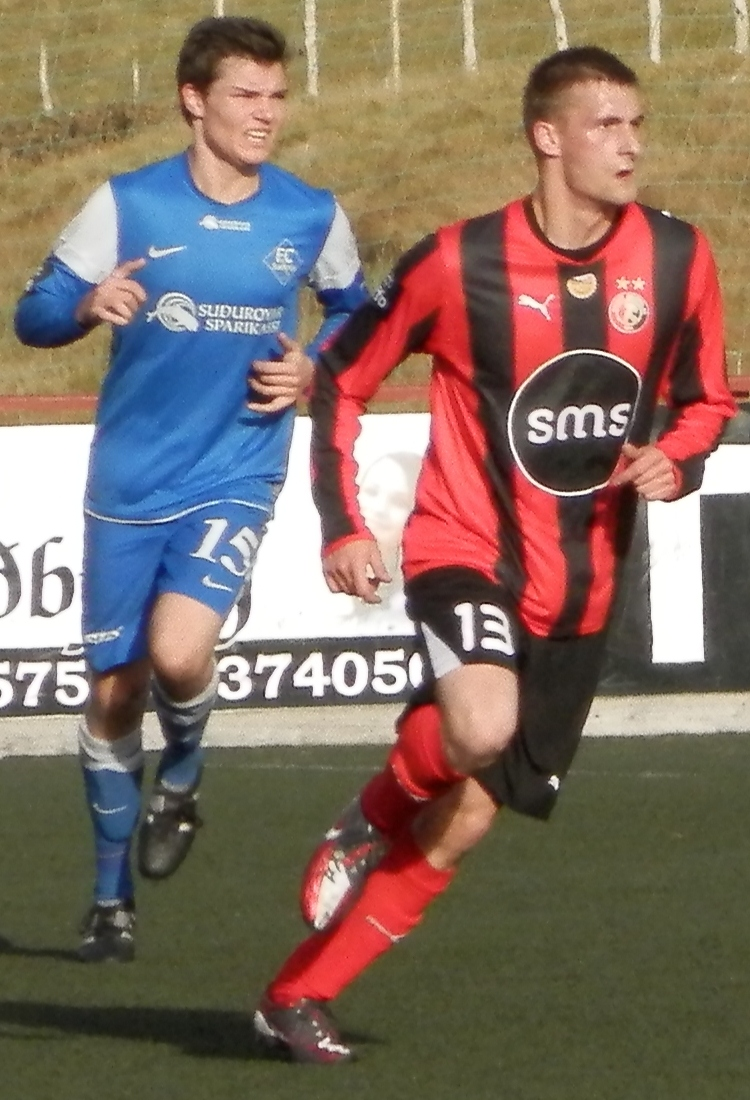
- Haraldsen (right) in 2012

Personal information
- Full name: Gunnar H. Haraldsen
- Date of birth: 21 November 1987 (age 38)
- Place of birth: Tórshavn, Faroe Islands
- Height: 1.85 m (6 ft 1 in)
- Positions: Centre-back; midfielder

Senior career*
Years	Team	Apps	(Gls)
2004–2005	Fram Tórshavn	20	(7)
2006–2009	FS Vágar/07 Vestur	81	(12)
2007	FS Vágar II	2	(0)
2010–2011	AB	46	(3)
2012–2013	HB	31	(6)
2012	HB II	16	(1)
2015	HB	21	(0)
2016	AB	2	(0)
2016	AB II	3	(1)
Total		222	(30)

International career
2003	Faroe Islands U17	2	(0)
2005	Faroe Islands U19	3	(0)
2014	Faroe Islands	1	(0)
- * Club domestic league appearances and goals

Gunnar H. Haraldsen (born 21 November 1987) is a Faroese former footballer who played as a centre-back or midfielder and made one appearance for the Faroe Islands national team.

== Career ==
Haraldsen earned his first and only cap for the Faroe Islands on 1 March 2014 in a friendly against Gibraltar. He came on as a 85th-minute substitute for Viljormur Davidsen, with the away match at Victoria Stadium finishing as a 4–1 win.

== Career statistics ==
=== International ===
Faroe Islands
Year	Apps	Goals
2014	1	0
Total	1	0
