= Javi Barranco =

Spanish footballer

Personal information
- Full name: Francisco Javier Barranco Lucas
- Date of birth: 3 February 1987 (age 39)
- Place of birth: Utrera, Spain
- Height: 1.78 m (5 ft 10 in)
- Position: Midfielder

Team information
- Current team: Toledo

Youth career
- Sevilla

Senior career*
Years	Team	Apps	(Gls)
2005–2008	Sevilla C	6	(2)
2006–2010	Sevilla B	46	(2)
2010–2011	Osasuna B	34	(4)
2011–2012	Real Unión	31	(1)
2012–2013	Hospitalet	16	(0)
2013–	Toledo	112	(7)
- * Club domestic league appearances and goals as of 25 September 2016

Francisco Javier 'Javi' Barranco Lucas (born 3 February 1987) is a Spanish footballer who plays for CD Toledo as a central midfielder.

== Club career ==
Born in Utrera, Province of Seville, Barranco finished his formation with local Sevilla FC, making his senior debuts with the C-team. On 8 January 2006 he first appeared with the reserves, starting in a 0–0 home draw against Écija Balompié in the Segunda División B; he continued to feature mainly for the third side in his beginnings, however.

On 31 August 2008 Barranco made his professional debut with the Andalusians' second team, starting in a 1–2 Segunda División loss at Albacete Balompié. On 10 January of the following year he scored his first goal in the competition, in a 1–1 home draw against SD Huesca.

In July 2010 Barranco signed with another reserve team, CA Osasuna B in the third level. He continued to compete in the category in the following years, representing Real Unión, CE L'Hospitalet and CD Toledo.
