= Nicola Segato =

Italian footballer

Personal information
- Date of birth: 24 August 1985 (age 41)
- Place of birth: Marostica, Italy
- Height: 1.76 m (5 ft 9 in)
- Position: Midfielder

Youth career
- –2005: Vicenza

Senior career*
Years	Team	Apps	(Gls)
2005–2006	Bassano	7	(0)
2006–2007	Chioggia Sottomarina	23	(2)
2007–2009	Jesolo	51	(8)
2009–2010	Venezia	31	(10)
2010–2011	Vicenza	0	(0)
2010–2011	→ Sacilese (loan)	26	(5)
2011–2012	Legnago	32	(9)
2012–2013	Pordenone	25	(2)
2013–2014	Delta Porto Tolle	28	(5)
2014–2015	Padova	27	(1)
2015	Abano	10	(1)
2015–2016	Budoni	17	(6)
2016–2018	Gozzano	69	(15)
2018–2019	Lecco	39	(8)
2019–2020	Pro Sesto	12	(1)
- * Club domestic league appearances and goals as of 13:02, 20 March 2020 (UTC)

Nicola Segato (born August 24, 1987) is an Italian former footballer who played as a midfielder.

== Career ==
On 24 October 2019, Segato was released from his contract with Lecco by mutual consent.
