= Nargiz Pashayeva (footballer) =

Azerbaijani footballer (born 1987)

Personal information
- Date of birth: 12 May 1987 (age 39)
- Position: Forward

Senior career*
Years	Team	Apps	(Gls)
- Gömrükçü Baku

International career^{‡}
2004	Azerbaijan U19	1	(0)
2010	Azerbaijan	5	(0)
- * Club domestic league appearances and goals ‡ National team caps and goals as of 25 August 2010

Nargiz Pashayeva (Azerbaijani: Nərgiz Paşayeva; born 12 May 1987) is an Azerbaijani former footballer who played as a forward. She has been a member of the Azerbaijan women's national team.
