= Oscar Magaña =

Chilean footballer (born 1987)

Oscar Magaña (born 3 July 1987 in Pichidegua, Chile) is a Chilean footballer and was most recently playing for Coquimbo Unido of the Primera División B in Chile.

== Teams ==
- (Chile) Magallanes 2006–2008
- (Chile) Deportes Temuco 2009
- (Chile) Trasandino de Los Andes 2010
- (Chile) San Marcos de Arica 2011–2012
- (Chile) Naval 2012–2013
- (Chile) Barnechea 2013–2014
- (Chile) Everton de Viña del Mar 2014–2015
- (Chile) Coquimbo Unido 2015–present
