= Gunnar Gunnarson =

Swedish historian (1918-2002)

Gunnar Gunnarson (1918–2002) was a Swedish socialist, marxist historian, writer, and publicist. He was a long-serving editor-in-chief at the Swedish Social Democratic publishing house Tidens förlag.
