= Adriano (disambiguation) =

Adriano may refer to:

== People ==
- Adriano (given name)
- Adriano (surname)

== Brazilian footballers known as Adriano ==
- Adriano (footballer, born 1969), full name Adriano Silva Francisco, goalkeeper
- Adriano Gerlin (born 20 September 1974), midfielder
- Adriano (footballer, born 25 September 1974), forward
- Adriano Basso (born 1975), goalkeeper for Bristol City, among others
- Adriano Alves (born 1976), striker
- Adriano Spadoto (born February 1977), FC Thun player in UEFA Cup, Champions League
- Adriano Gabiru (born 11 August 1977), midfielder for Internacional, once capped for Brazil in Confederations Cup 2003
- Adriano Rossato (born 27 August 1977), defender
- Adriano (footballer, born 1978), full name Adriano Rodrigues da Silva also known as Adriano Cabeça, defensive midfielder and coach
- Adriano (footballer, born January 1979), full name Adriano Vieira Louzada, striker
- Adriano (footballer, born June 1979), full name Adriano Ferreira Silvestre, midfielder
- Ferreira Pinto (footballer, born 1979), full name Adriano Ferreira Pinto, winger for Atalanta
- Adriano Duarte (born 1980), central defender
- Adriano (footballer, born January 1982), full name Adriano Ferreira Martins, striker
- Adriano (footballer, born February 1982), full name Adriano Leite Ribeiro, former Inter Milan and Flamengo player, Brazil international in 2000s
- Adriano (footballer, born April 1982), full name Adriano Pereira da Silva, Monaco defender
- Adriano Pimenta (born November 1982), midfielder for Swiss club Thun
- Adriano (footballer, born 1984), full name Adriano Correia Claro, defender/midfielder for Beşiktaş (formerly at Barcelona), Brazil international in 2000s
- Adriano (footballer, born July 1985), full name Adriano Alves dos Santos, defender
- Adriano (footballer, born October 1985), full name Francisco Adriano da Silva Rodrigues, forward
- Luiz Adriano (born April 1987), striker
- Adriano (footballer, born May 1987), full name Adriano Bispo dos Santos, defensive midfielder
- Adriano (footballer, born September 1987), full name Carlos Adriano de Sousa Cruz, strike
- Adriano (footballer, born December 1987), full name Adriano José de Lara
- Adriano (footballer, born February 1994), full name Adriano Louzada e Silva, winger
- Adriano (footballer, born August 1994), Adriano Aparecido Narcizo, winger
- Adriano Amorim (born 2002), full name Adriano Luiz Amorim Santos, striker or winger

== See also ==
- Adriano rock
- Adriano in Siria
- Adrian (disambiguation)
- Palazzo Adriano
- Parco Adriano
- Santo Adriano
- Teatro Adriano
- Adrianus (given name)
