= Adriano (surname) =

Adriano is a surname derived from the personal name Adriano.

- Carlo Adriano (born 12 February 2001), a Spanish footballer
- Dino Adriano (24 April 1943 – 9 May 2018), British businessman
- Elisângela Adriano (born July 27, 1972), Brazilian shot putter and discus thrower
- Francis Adriano (born September 24, 1975), Filipino former professional basketball player
- Jerry Adriano (born November 1, 1983, in Cape Verde), Cape Verdean football player
- Joaquin Adriano (January 29, 1959 ― January 22, 2009), Northern Mariana Islander politician
- Mike Adriano (born June 30, 1980), Spanish adult content producer and director
- Paulo Adriano (born 3 March 1977 in Anadia, Aveiro District), a Portuguese former footballer
- Reni Adriano, Brazilian novelist and playwright
- Tomás Adriano (born October 14, 1977), former Mexican football player

== See also ==
- Adriano
- Adriano (disambiguation)
- Adrian (surname)
