= Adrian (surname) =

Adrian is a surname derived from the Latin personal name Adrianus. Notable people with the surname include:

- Barbara Adrian (1931–2014), American painter
- Benedicte Adrian (born 1963), Norwegian singer and artist
- Cem Adrian (born 1980), Turkish singer-songwriter
- Charles R. Adrian (1922–2004), American political science professor
- Chris Adrian (born 1970), American author
- Edgar Adrian (1889–1977), English electrophysiologist
- Hester Adrian, Baroness Adrian (1899–1966), British baroness, mental health worker
- Iris Adrian (1912–1994), American actress
- Isabel Adrian (born 1977), Swedish television personality
- Kelsey Adrian (born 1989), Canadian basketball player
- Louis Adrian (1859–1933), French Army officer
- Max Adrian (1903–1973), Irish actor
- Nathan Adrian (born 1988), American swimmer
- Pete Adrian (born 1948), American football coach
- Phil Adrian (born c. 1933), Canadian football player
- Pierre Adrian (1926–1972), American chef
- Rhys Adrian (1928–1990), British playwright and screenwriter
- Richard Adrian, 2nd Baron Adrian (1927–1995), British peer and physiologist
- Robert Adrian (1935–2015), Canadian artist
- Ronald Adrian, American engineer and physicist
- Rudy Adrian (born 1965), New Zealand ambient musician
- Salvador Minguijón Adrián (1874–1959), Spanish law scholar, political theorist and politician
- Samuel Adrian (born 1998), Swedish footballer
- Tamara Adrián (born 1954), Venezuelan politician
- Tobias Adrian (born 1971), German and American economist
- William Lawrence Adrian (1883–1972), American prelate

== See also ==
- Adrian (disambiguation)
