= Adriano =

- Gender: Male
- Language: Italian, Spanish, Portuguese

Origin
- Meaning: From Hadria

Other names
- See also: Adrian

Adriano is the form of the Latin given name Hadrianus commonly used in the Italian language; the form Adrião can be used in the Portuguese language while the form Adrian is used in the English language. Notable people with the name include:

- Adriano do Baldy (born 1969), Brazilian politician
- Adriano Banchieri (1568–1634), Italian composer, music theorist, organist and poet
- Adriano Bernareggi (1884–1953), Italian Catholic bishop
- Adriano Castellesi (c. 1461-c. 1521), Italian cardinal and writer
- Adriano Celentano (born 1938), Italian entertainer
- Adriano Coelho (born 1989), Brazilian politician
- Adriano Correia de Oliveira (1942–1982), Portuguese singer and composer
- Adriano Costa (born 1975), Brazilian contemporary artist
- Adriano Espaillat (born 1954), Dominican-American politician
- Adriano Galliani (born 1944), Italian entrepreneur
- Adriano Garrido (born 1972), Brazilian beach volleyball player
- Adriano Goldschmied (1944–2026), Italian fashion designer
- Adriano Manole (born 2007), Romanian footballer
- Adriano Olivetti (1901–1960), Italian entrepreneur
- Adriano Panatta (born 1950), Italian tennis player
- Adriano Rigoglioso (born 1979), English footballer
- Adriano Vicente da Silva (born 1980), Brazilian serial killer and rapist
- Adriano Sofri (born 1942), Italian politician and journalist
- Adriano Visconti (1915–1945), Italian air force major
- Adrian Willaert (c. 1480 – 1562), Flemish composer, who in sources was sometimes referred to simply as "Adriano"

== Brazilian footballers ==
- Adriano (footballer, born 1969), full name Adriano Silva Francisco, goalkeeper
- Adriano Gerlin (born 1974), midfielder
- Adriano (footballer, born 25 September 1974), forward
- Adriano Basso (born 1975), goalkeeper
- Adriano Alves (born 1976), striker
- Adriano Spadoto (born 1977), defender
- Adriano Gabiru (born 1977), midfielder
- Adriano Rossato (born 1977), defender
- Adriano (footballer, born 1978), full name Adriano Rodrigues da Silva, also known as Adriano Cabeça, midfielder and coach
- Adriano (footballer, born January 1979), full name Adriano Vieira Louzada, striker
- Adriano (footballer, born June 1979), full name Adriano Ferreira Silvestre, midfielder
- Ferreira Pinto (footballer, born 1979), full name Adriano Ferreira Pinto, winger
- Adriano Duarte (born 1980), defender
- Adriano (footballer, born 1980), full name Adriano Padilha Nascimento, forward
- Adriano (footballer, born January 1982), full name Adriano Ferreira Martins, striker
- Adriano (footballer, born February 1982), full name Adriano Leite Ribeiro, striker
- Adriano (footballer, born April 1982), full name Adriano Pereira da Silva, defender
- Adriano Pimenta (born 1982), midfielder
- Adriano (footballer, born 1984), full name Adriano Correia Claro, defender/midfielder
- Adriano (footballer, born July 1985), full name Adriano Alves dos Santos, defender
- Adriano (footballer, born October 1985), full name Francisco Adriano da Silva Rodrigues, forward
- Luiz Adriano (born April 1987), full name Luiz Adriano de Souza da Silva, striker
- Adriano (footballer, born May 1987), full name Adriano Bispo dos Santos, midfielder
- Adriano (footballer, born September 1987), full name Carlos Adriano de Sousa Cruz, striker
- Adriano (footballer, born December 1987), full name Adriano José de Lara, defender
- Adriano (footballer, born February 1994), full name Adriano Louzada e Silva, winger
- Adriano (footballer, born August 1994), full name Adriano Aparecido Narcizo, winger
- Adriano (footballer, born November 1999), full name Adriano Firmino dos Santos da Silva, defensive midfielder
- Adriano Amorim (born 2002), full name Adriano Luiz Amorim Santos, striker/winger
- Adriano (footballer, born 2006), full name Adriano Carvalho Ribeiro, forward

== Fictional characters ==
- Adriano Tumino, a supervillain known as the Vulture, appearing in Spider-Man: Across the Spider-Verse

== See also ==
- Adrien
- Hadrian
