= Adriano Costa =

Adriano Costa may refer to:

- Adriano Costa (footballer)
- Adriano Costa (artist)

== See also ==
- Adrianna Costa, American television personality
- Adrien Costa, American cyclist
- Adrian Costa, Australian freestyle skier
