= Adriano in Siria =

Adriano in Siria may refer to:

- Adriano in Siria (Metastasio), libretto by Italian poet Metastasio
- Adriano in Siria (Mysliveček), 18th-century Italian opera seria by the Czech composer Josef Mysliveček
- Adriano in Siria (Pergolesi), opera by Giovanni Battista Pergolesi

== See also ==
- Adriano (disambiguation)
