= Fábio Noronha =

Brazilian footballer (born 1975)

Personal information
- Full name: Fábio Noronha de Oliveira
- Date of birth: 12 October 1975 (age 51)
- Place of birth: Rio de Janeiro, Brazil
- Height: 1.82 m (6 ft 0 in)
- Position: Goalkeeper

Senior career*
Years	Team	Apps	(Gls)
1994–1997	Flamengo	1	(0)
1997–1998	Fluminense	6	(0)
- América-MG
	Gama	2	(0)
2001–2002	São Raimundo (AM)		
- Angra
- Portuguesa
2004–2005	Ankaraspor	8	(0)
2006	América (RJ)	3	(0)
2007	Atlético (GO)	0	(0)
2007	ABC	0	(0)
2007	América (RJ)	0	(0)
2007–2008	Happy Valley	11	(0)
2008–2009	TSW Pegasus	10	(0)
2010	América (Teófilo Otoni)		
2010	Goytacaz		
2010	Confiança	5	(0)
2011	América (Teófilo Otoni)		

International career
1993–1995	Brazil U20		
- * Club domestic league appearances and goals

Fábio Noronha de Oliveira (born 12 October 1975) is a Brazilian former professional footballer who played as a goalkeeper. He is also known as Oliveira (Chinese: 奧利華拉) in Hong Kong and just Fábio Noronha inside Brazil.

== Career ==
=== Turkey ===
Fábio Noronha left for Turkish side Ankaraspor in 2004 and signed a four-year contract. After playing only five Turkish Super League matches, he terminated his contract with the club in January 2005, in part due to breaking his leg.

=== Return to Brazil ===
In January 2006 Fábio Noronha signed a contract with América (RJ). He was first-choice keeper for the team at the 2006 Campeonato Brasileiro Série C first match. However, he lost his place to Adriano in the second and third match. Fábio Noronha started the fourth to fifth match of the return leg but again lost his place both in first choice and on the bench in the sixth match (on the bench was Wagner). The club finished as the bottom of Group 11, failing to reach the second stage.

In 2007, Fábio Noronha signed a contract with Atlético (GO) for 2007 Campeonato Goiano and 2007 Copa do Brasil. With Fábio M. Oliveira on the front, the team won the state league. In May 2007 he left for ABC to play at 2007 Campeonato Brasileiro Série C. He was the backup keeper for Raniere.

In August 2007 he returned to América (RJ) and signed a one-year contract. He was the understudy of Donizeti and competed for the bench position with Tarso.

=== Hong Kong ===
In October 2007 Fábio Noronha left for Hong Kong First Division side Happy Valley, as understudy of Fan Chun Yip. He also was selected by Hong Kong League XI for the 2008 Guangdong–Hong Kong Cup. In 2008, he left for TSW Pegasus but after a big mistake, he lost his starting place to Li Jian. Fábio Noronha remained with Pegasus until mid-2009.

=== Second return to Brazil ===
In June 2009, Fábio Noronha returned to Brazil and trained at América (RJ). However, he failed to agree the personal terms with club and left on 1 July.

In January 2010 he left América de Teófilo Otoni for 2010 Campeonato Mineiro. On 31 March 2010, he joined Goytacaz for the remaining Campeonato Carioca Série B match. Goytacaz entered the second stage and finished as the bottom (the 6th). After the season, he signed a contract with Confiança for 2010 Campeonato Brasileiro Série D. He missed the opening league matches, but started the remaining five matches.

In December 2010 he re-joined América de Teófilo Otoni.

=== International career ===
He capped for Brazil at the 1993 FIFA World Youth Championship, and the 1995 edition.

== Honours ==
- Campeonato Goiano: 2007

Individual

- Toulon Tournament Best Goalkeeper: 1995, 1996
