= Adrian helmet =

Combat helmet

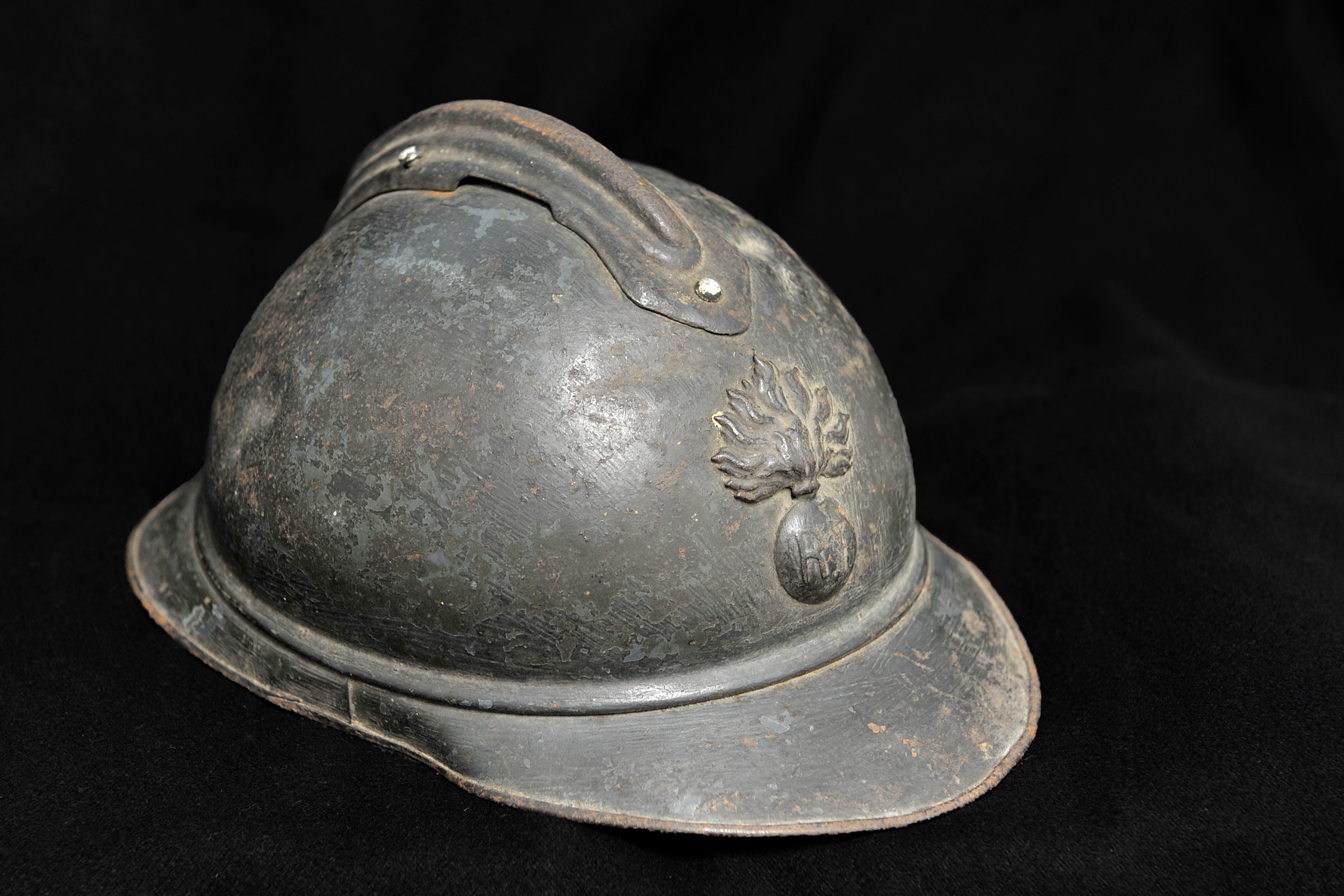
- French infantry M15 Adrian helmet
- Type: Combat helmet
- Place of origin: France

Service history
- In service: 1915–present
- Used by: France; Vichy France; Free France; Belgium; Luxembourg; Russian Empire; Russian Republic; Soviet Union; Poland; Romania; Kingdom of Serbia; Yugoslavia; Republic of Latvia; Greece; Italy; Second Spanish Republic; Germany; China; Thailand; Mexico; Japan; Spain; Albania; Turkey; Morocco; United States; Brazil; Peru; Ukrainian People's Republic; Belarusian People's Republic
- Wars: First World War; Warlord Era; Russian Civil War; Ukrainian–Soviet War; Latvian War of Independence; Polish-Soviet War; Polish-Ukrainian War; Finnish Civil War; Hungarian–Romanian War; Greco-Turkish War; Rif War; Chinese Civil War; Spanish Civil War; Second Sino-Japanese War; Second World War; Greco–Italian War; Franco-Thai War; Italian Civil War; Greek Civil War; First Indochina War; Korean War; 1968 student demonstrations in Yugoslavia

Production history
- Designer: Louis Adrian
- Designed: 1915
- Produced: 1915–?
- No. produced: Millions
- Variants: M15; M26; Wz.15

The Adrian helmet (French: Casque Adrian) is a combat helmet designed by Louis Adrian for the French Army during World War I. Its original version, the M15, was the first standard helmet of the French Army and was designed when millions of French troops were engaged in trench warfare, and head wounds from falling shrapnel generated by indirect fire became a frequent cause of battlefield casualties. Introduced in 1915, it was the first modern steel helmet and it served as the basic helmet of many armies well into the 1930s. Initially issued to infantry soldiers, in modified form they were also issued to cavalry and tank crews. A subsequent version, the M26, was used during World War II.

== History ==
=== World War I ===
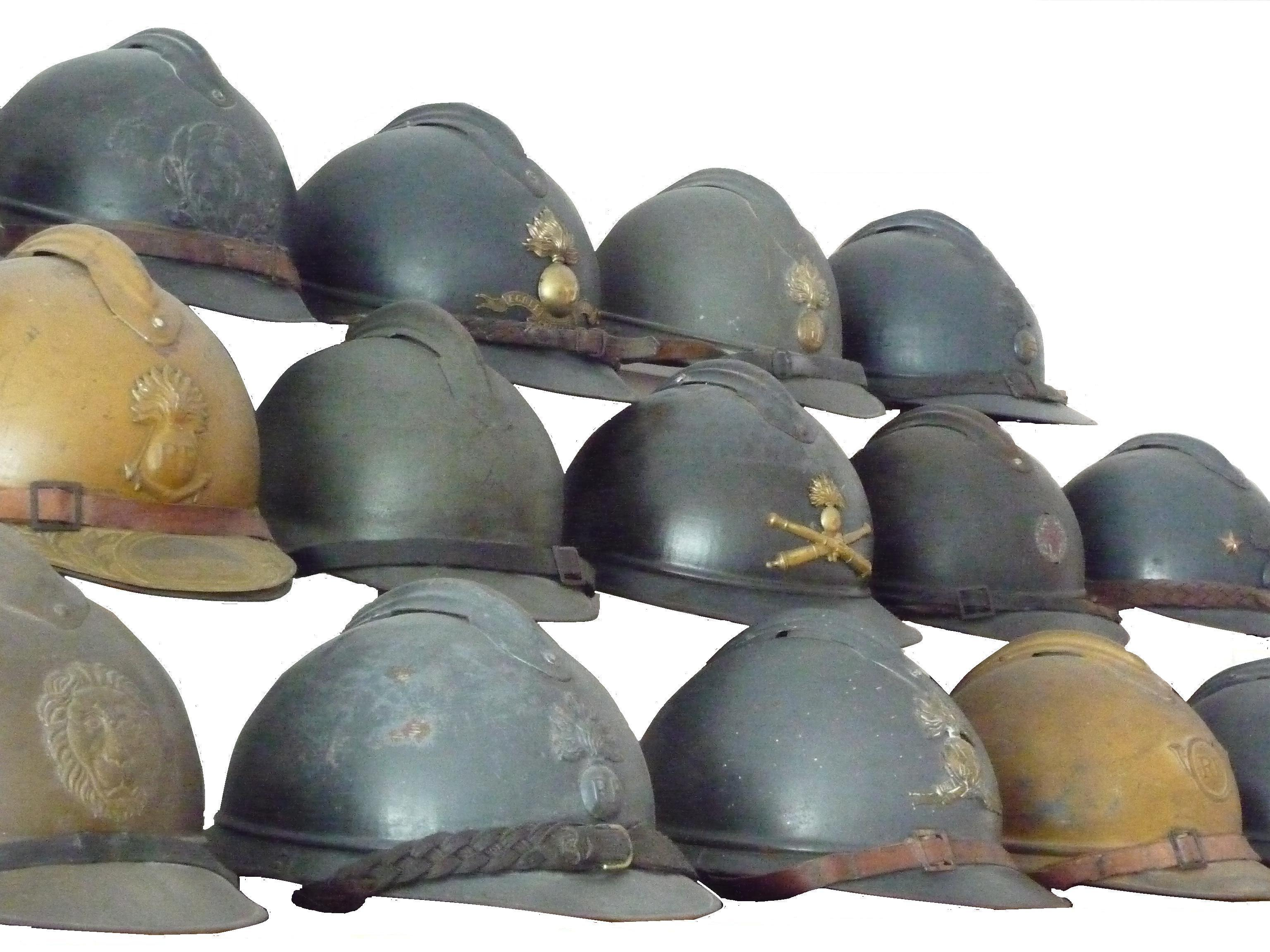
Collection of Adrian helmets from various regiments of various states

At the outbreak of World War I in August 1914, soldiers in the French Army wore the standard kepi cap, which provided no protection against injury. The early stages of trench warfare proved that even basic protection of the head would result in a significantly lower mortality rate among front-line soldiers. By the beginning of 1915, a rudimentary steel skull-cap (calotte métallique, cervelière) was being issued to be worn under the kepi.

Consequently, the French staff ordered development of a metal helmet that could protect soldiers from the shrapnel of exploding artillery shells. Intendant-General Louis Adrian designed a helmet which was adopted by the French military and named after him. Since soldiers in trenches were also vulnerable to shrapnel exploding above their heads, a deflector crest was added along the helmet's axis. Branch insignia in the form of a flaming grenade for line infantry and cavalry, a bugle horn for chasseurs, flaming grenade and crossed cannon for artillery, an anchor for colonial troops and a crescent for North African units was attached to the front. Contrary to common misconception, the Adrian helmet, and other World War I helmets, were not designed to protect the wearer from direct impact by rifle or machine gun cartridges, but shrapnel from indirect fire.

The helmet adopted by the army was made of mild steel and weighed only 0.765 kg (1 lb 11.0 oz), which made it lighter and less protective than the contemporary British Brodie helmet and the German Stahlhelm. Orders were placed for the helmets in the spring of 1915, which started being issued by July. By September, all frontline troops in France were issued the helmet. The helmet was surprisingly complex to produce, with seventy stages involved in its production, not including those required to prepare the metal. The slot for the badges and the distinctive crest took additional time to manufacture, while also adding a hundred grams of weight.

However, the helmet was deliberately designed this way to evoke the artistic style of the highly popular military artist Édouard Detaille, which helped raise the morale of the troops. Indeed French troops identified closely with their helmets. The helmet's light weight was also better suited to France's emphasis on mobility and was easier for soldiers to wear for extended periods. In addition to the helmet, a set of armored "epaulets" were also developed by Adrian and issued to defend against shrapnel and air-dropped darts, although they were not in common use.

From late 1915, a cloth cover for the helmet was issued, in khaki or light blue, to prevent reflection. However, it was found that if the helmet was pierced by shell splinters, pieces of dirty cloth were carried into the wound, which increased the risk of infection. Consequently, in mid-1916 an order was issued that the covers should be discarded. By the end of World War I, the Adrian had been issued to almost all infantry units fighting with the French Army. It was also used by some of the American divisions fighting in France, including the African-American 369th Infantry Regiment, commonly known as the Harlem Hellfighters, and the Polish forces of Haller's Blue Army. The French Gendarmerie mobile adopted a dark blue version in 1926, and continued to wear it into the 1960s, well after the regular army had discarded it.

In December 1915, Winston Churchill (later to become Prime Minister of the United Kingdom from 1940 to 1945), while serving as a major with the British Army's Grenadier Guards, was presented with an Adrian helmet by the French General Émile Fayolle. He is seen wearing it in photographs and in a portrait painted by Sir John Lavery.

The helmet proved to be fairly effective against shrapnel and while complex to manufacture (see details above) it was relatively inexpensive. As a consequence, more than twenty million Adrian helmets were produced. They were widely adopted by other countries, including Albania, Belgium, Brazil, China, Czechoslovakia, Greece, Haiti, Italy (including license-built versions), Japan, Latvia, Luxembourg, Mexico, Morocco, Peru, Poland, Romania, Russia, Serbia, Spain, Siam, Turkey, the United States, USSR, and Yugoslavia, many of these states adding their own insignia to the front of the helmet.

However, because the new steel helmets offered little protection against bullets, they were reportedly often among the first pieces of equipment to be abandoned by soldiers on the battlefield. It was also discovered that the badge placed on the front of helmets impaired the strength of the helmet because of the two slots required. This perceived weakness made several armies remove their national insignia altogether. Early helmets were painted "horizon-blue" (light blue-grey) for French troops and khaki for colonial forces. Those made after 1935 are usually painted khaki, reflecting the French army movement to a more camouflaged uniform in the 1930s.

=== Later service ===
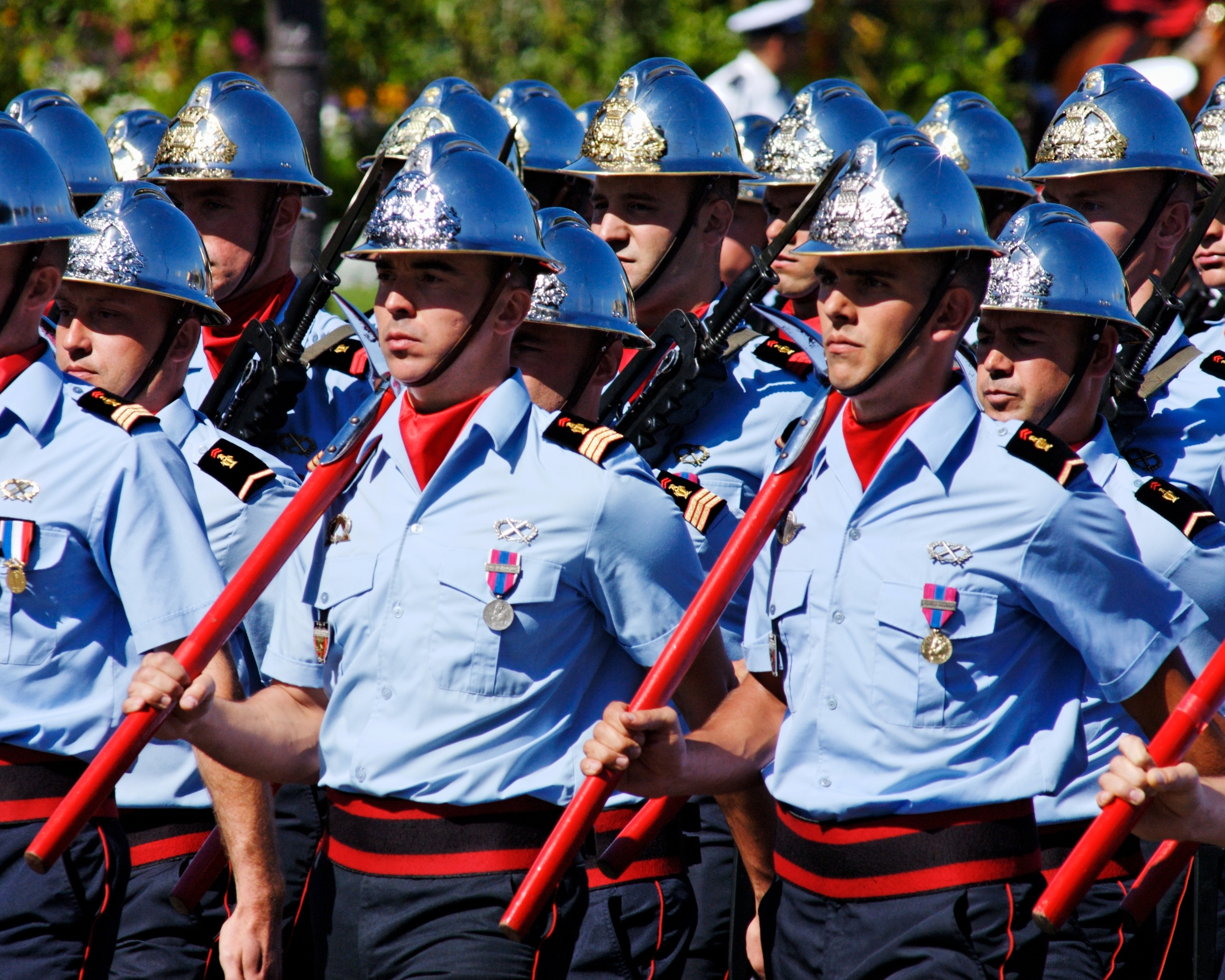
The Paris Fire Brigade (pompiers) still wears a silver type of Adrian helmet on parades.

In 1926, the Adrian helmet was modified by being constructed of stronger steel and simplified by having the main part of the helmet stamped from one piece of metal, and therefore without the joining rim around the helmet that characterizes the M15. The large ventilation hole under the comb, which had been a weak point of the old design, was also replaced with a series of small holes. The M26 helmet continued in use with the French Army until after World War II, and was also used by the French police up to the 1970s. During the interwar period Belgium began to produce their own domestically made M26 Adrians and exported them around the globe. These helmets can be distinguished from their French counterparts, because they have a slightly different comb and a wider rim. In other countries the Adrian-type helmets were also in use with the firefighting units, railway guards or marine infantry (e.g. Japan's SNLF). Adrian helmets are still prized by collectors today. In 1940, Mexico began to produce M26 helmets locally after shipments from France stopped due to the German occupation. A crestless version was produced in small numbers as well. The Turkish Army used them until 1950s. The last country to replace the Adrian helmets was Thailand. The Thais had adopted the Adrian helmet in the interwar period and issued them until the 1970s, when more modern and affordable helmets such as the American M1 replaced the French helmet.

== Modern assessment ==
A 2020 study published by PLOS One found that the Adrian helmet outperformed the Advanced Combat Helmet, which was deployed almost a century later, in protection against overhead blasts waves. It also surpassed the Stahlhelm and Brodie helmets. The researchers believed the crest, a feature unique to the Adrian helmet, might be the cause.

== Gallery ==
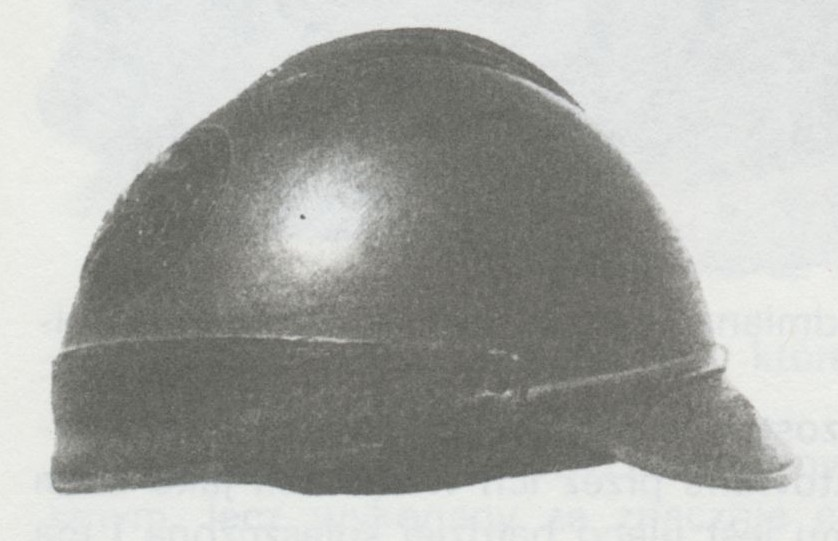
A smaller version of the Adrian helmet for tank crew members

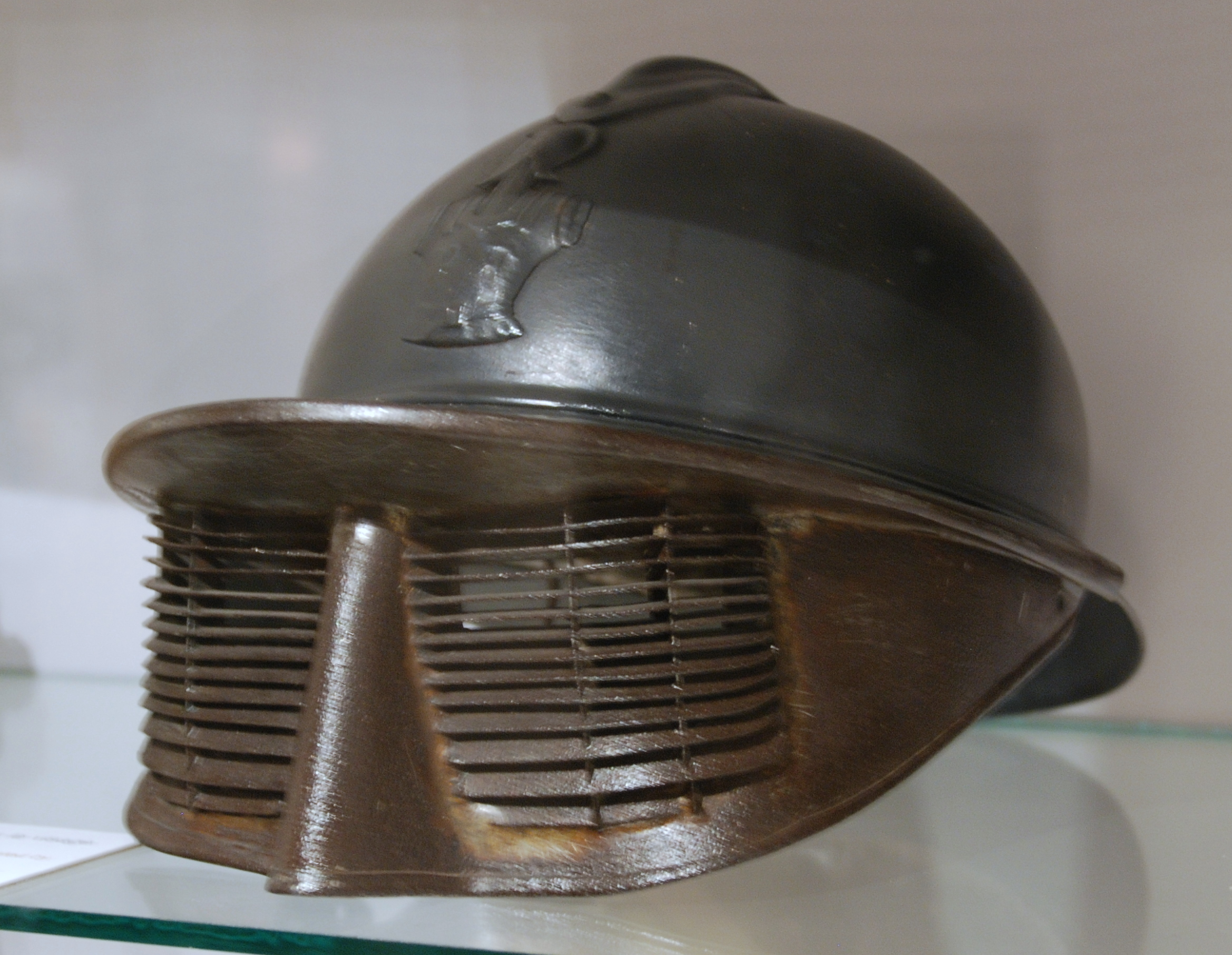
French sentry's helmet designed to protect the face, invented by Polack, medical officer; the Verdun Memorial, Fleury-devant-Douaumont, France

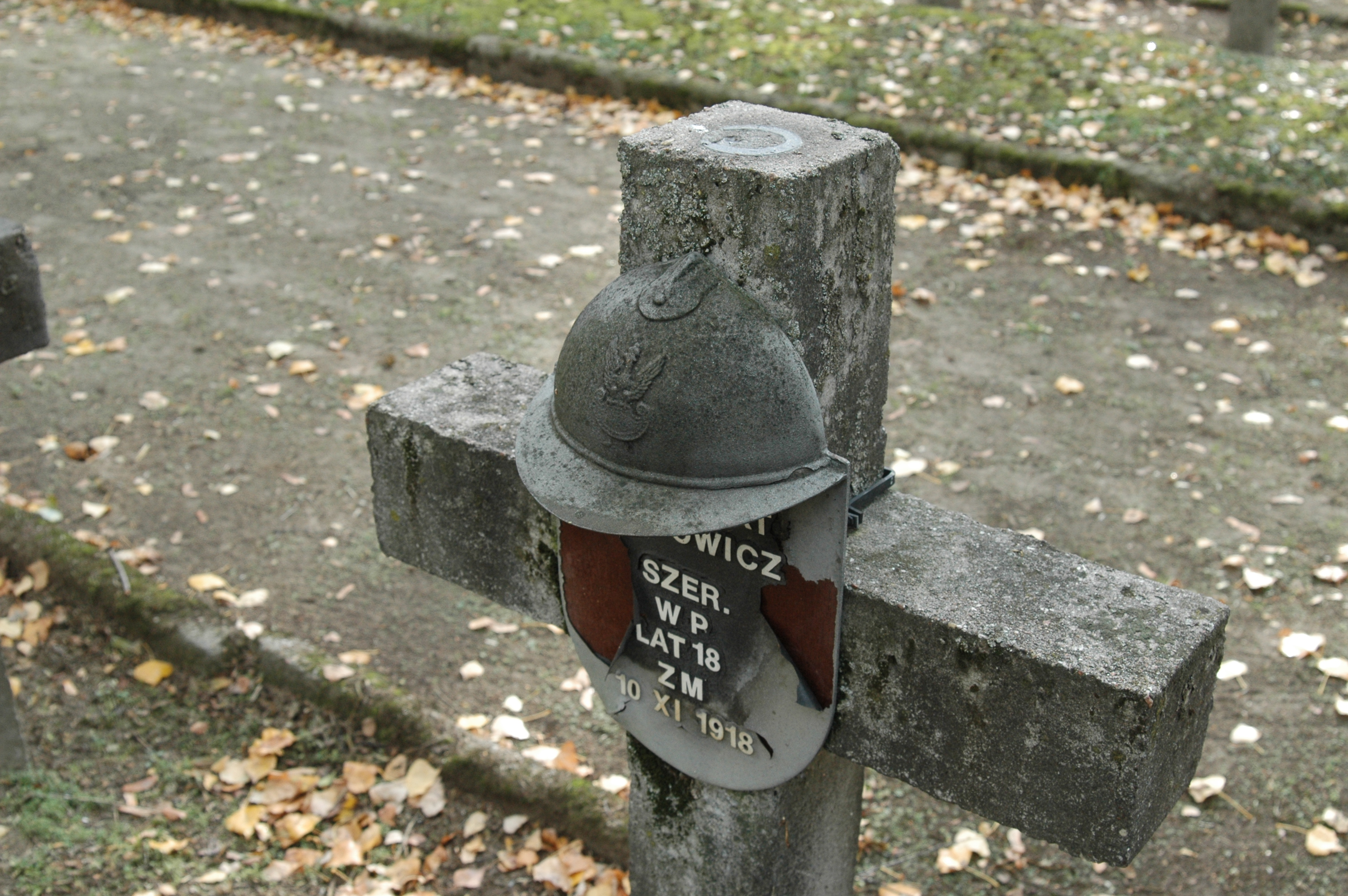
Wz.15 (Polish version of the Adrian helmet) as part of a soldier's grave at Powązki cemetery in Warsaw

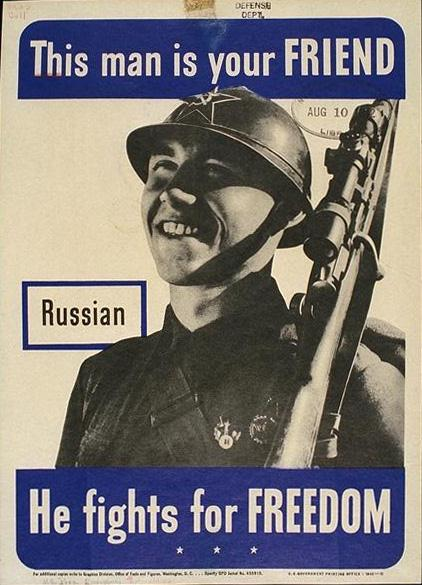
World War II recognition card featuring a Soviet soldier wearing the Adrian helmet with red star insignia

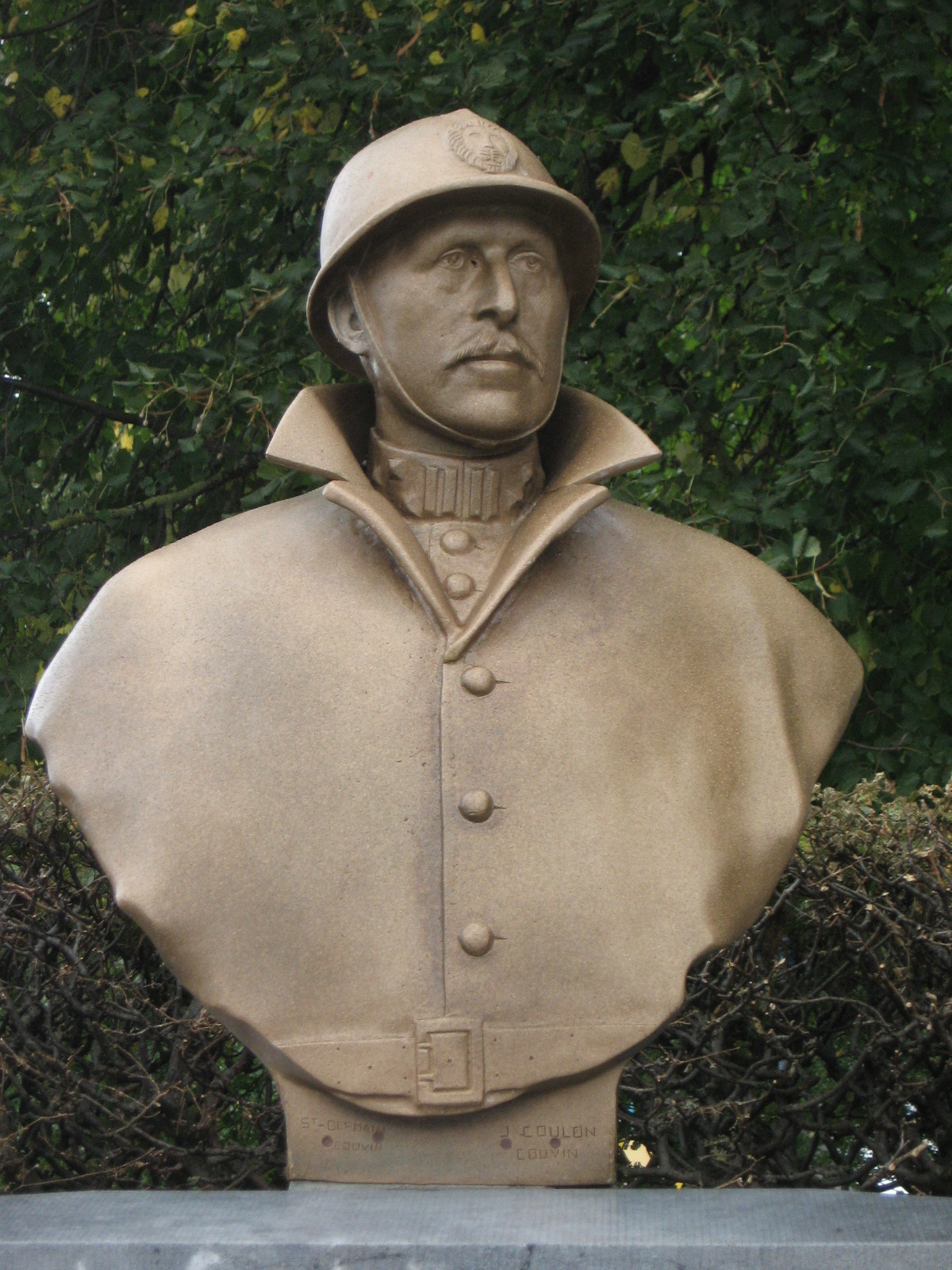
Statue of Albert I of Belgium with Adrian helmet distinguished by lion's head insignia

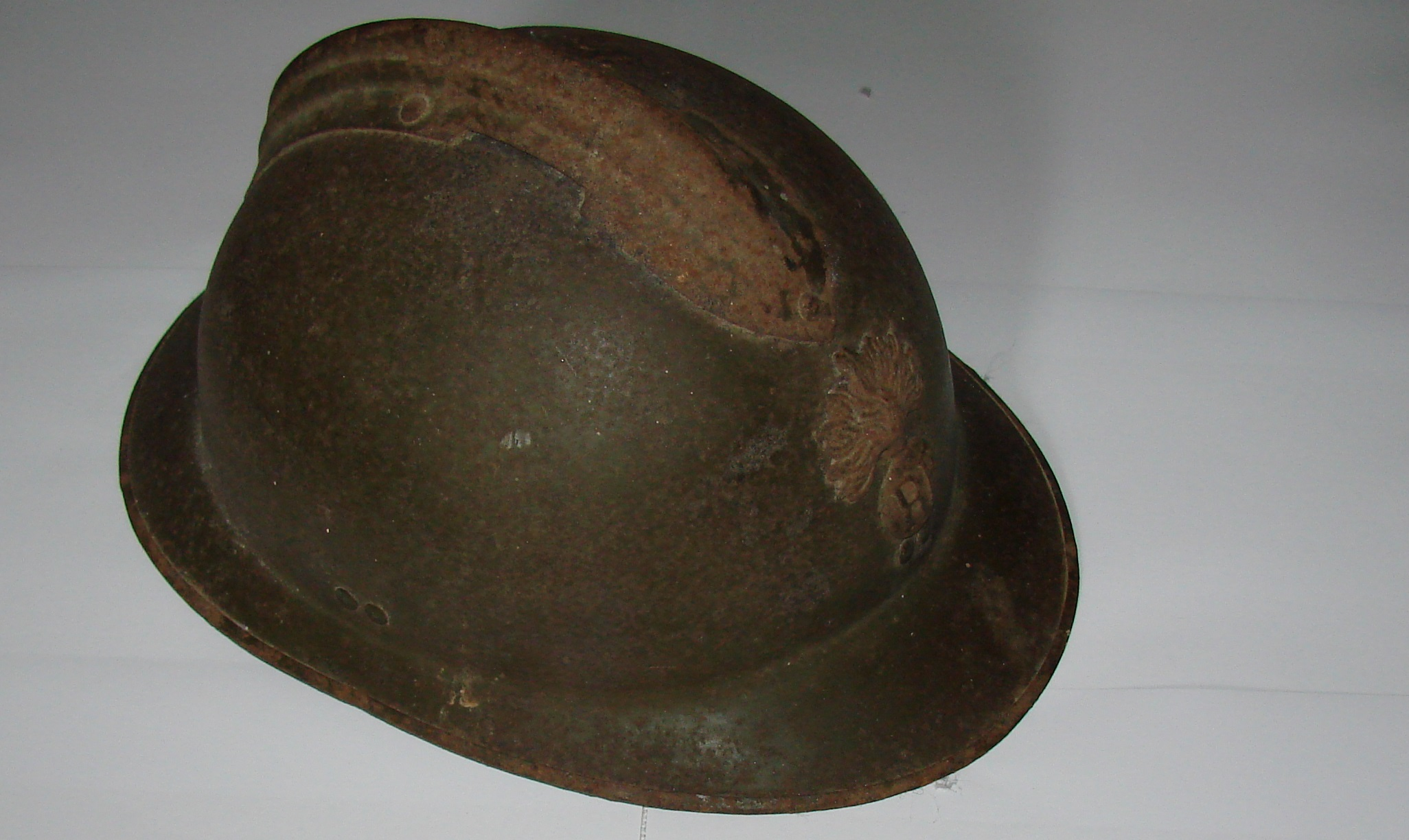
A 1926 model of the Adrian helmet

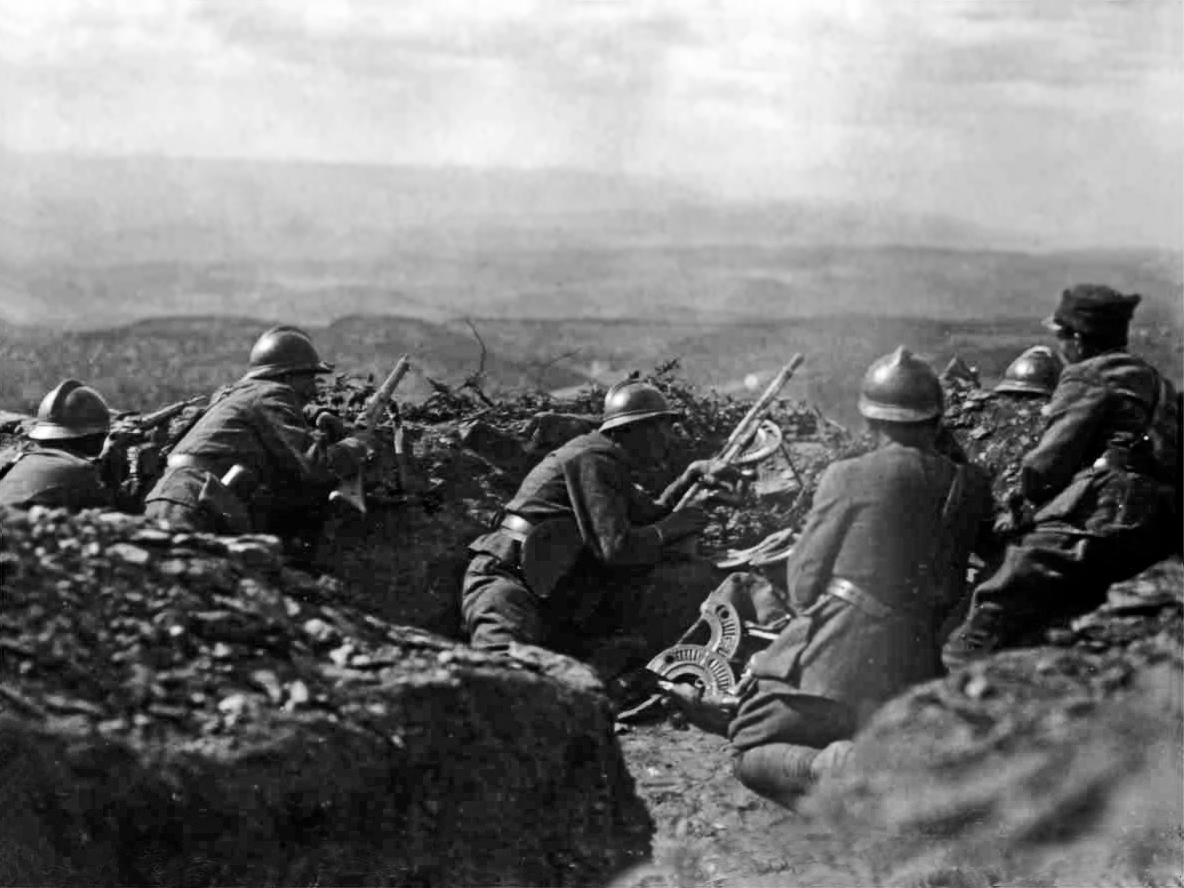
Greek soldiers wearing Adrian helmets at Afyonkarahisar, 1922, Greco-Turkish War (1919–1922)

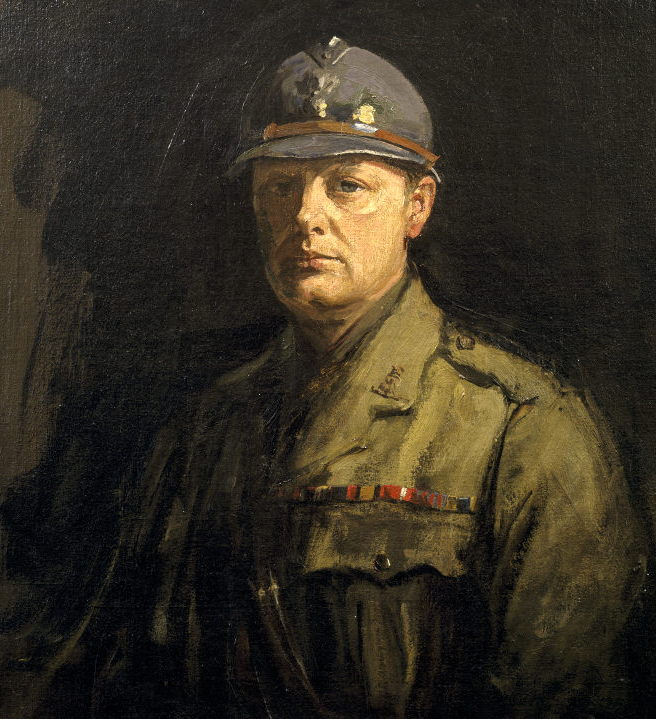
Lavery's portrait of Churchill wearing an Adrian helmet presented by General Fayolle.

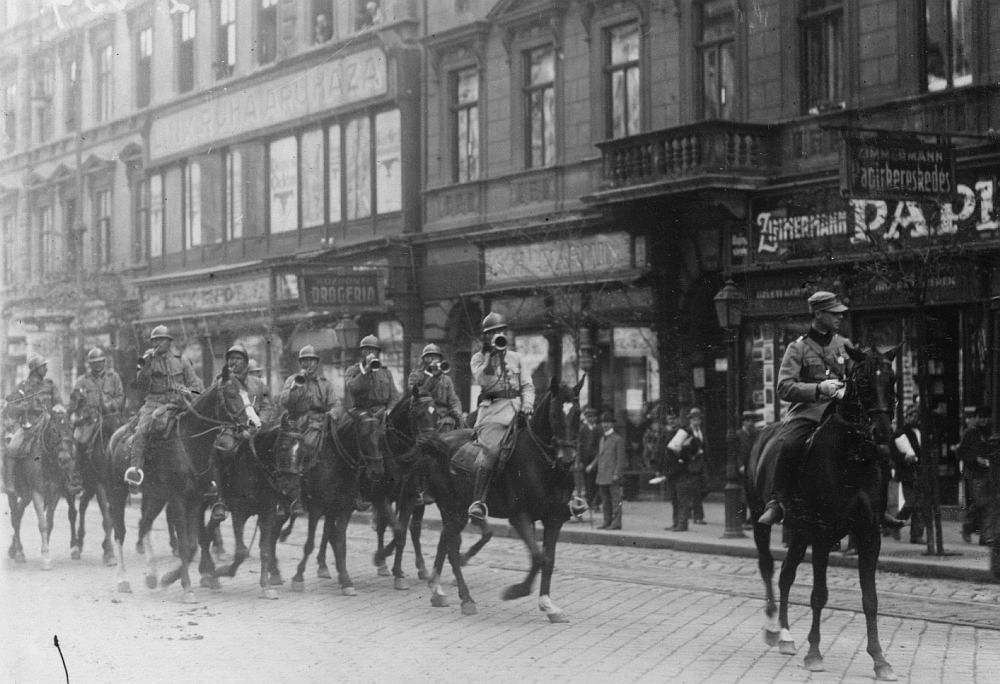
Romanian Cavalry wearing Adrian helmets in Budapest in 1919

== See also ==
- Brodie helmet
- Pickelhaube
- Sallet
- SSh-36
- Stahlhelm

== Notes and references ==
=== Bibliography ===
- Jacek Kijak; Bartłomiej Błaszkowski (2004). Hełmy Wojska Polskiego 1917–2000 (in Polish). Warsaw: Bellona. p. 128. ISBN 83-11-09636-8.
