= Parco Adriano =

Public park in Rome, Italy

Coordinates: 41°54′13″N 12°27′59″E

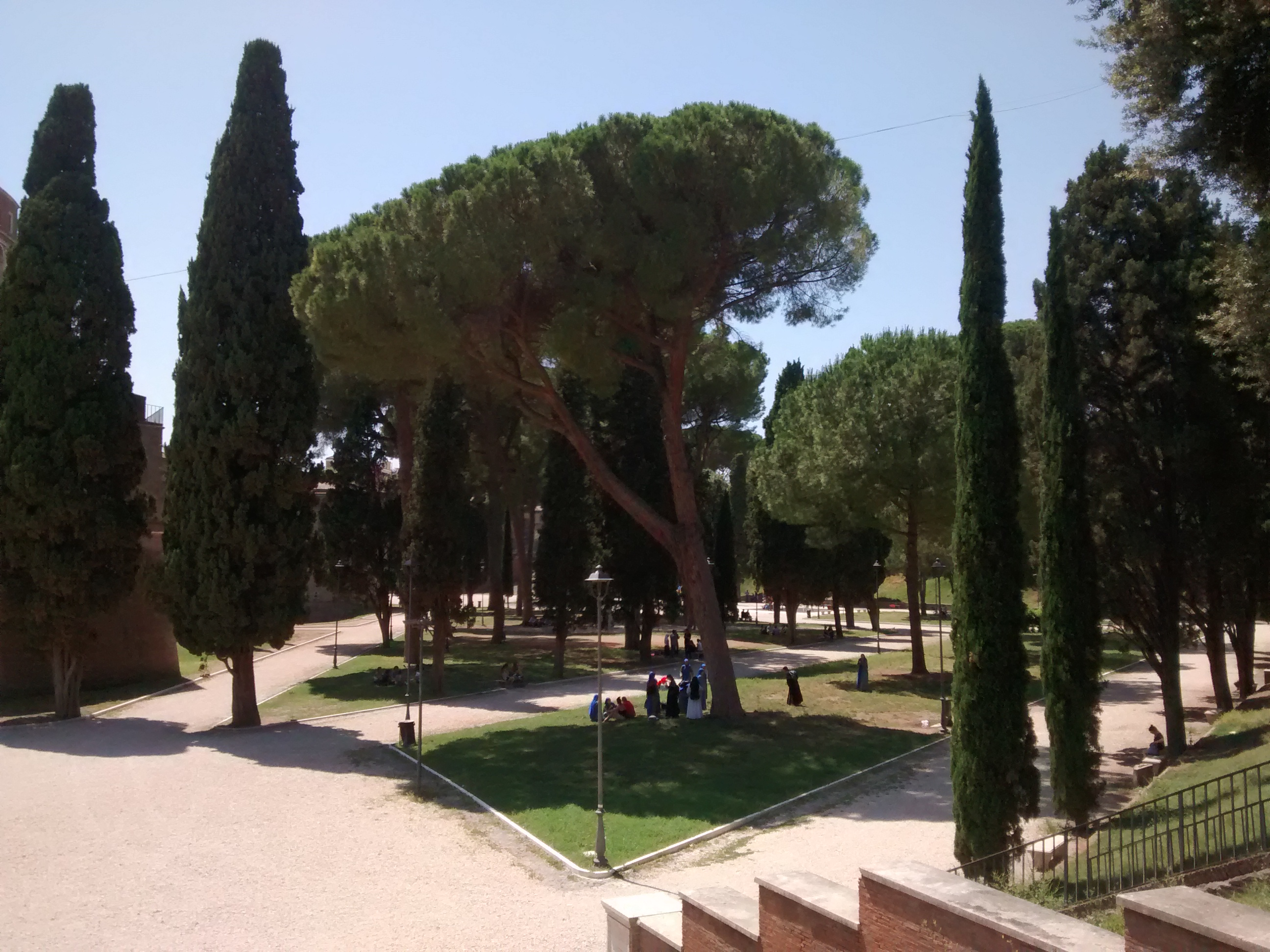
Parco Adriano

Parco Adriano is a park in Rome, Italy on the northern bank of the Tiber, just to the east of the Vatican. It contains the Castel Sant'Angelo.

It is a good place for families to go to, because it has a playground for children, who can "let off steam" after visiting churches and museums. Picnics are allowed.
