= Adriano do Baldy =

Brazilian politician (born 1969)

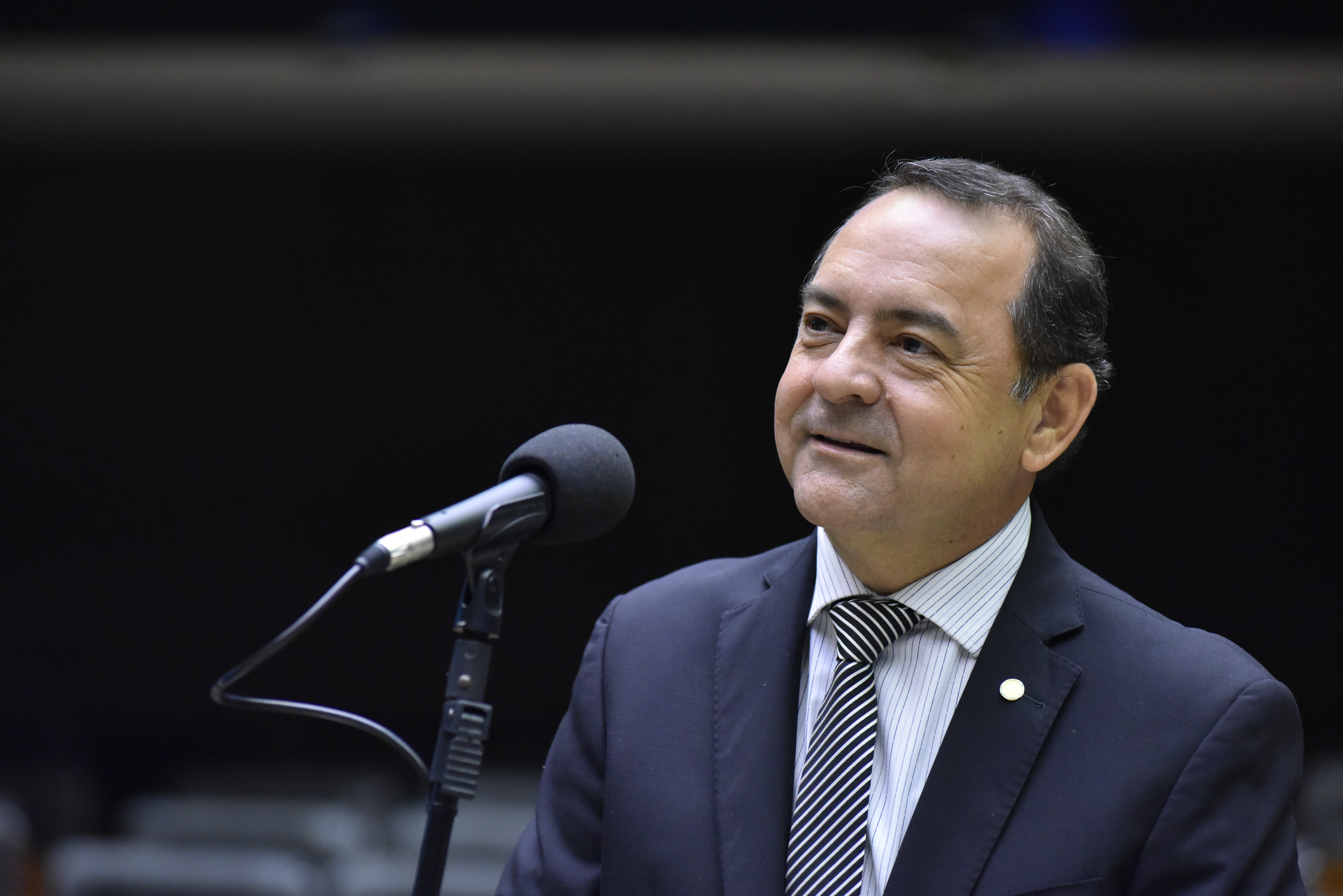
- Baldy in 2022

Member of the Chamber of Deputies
- Incumbent
- Assumed office 1 February 2019
- Constituency: Goiás

Personal details
- Born: 6 September 1969 (age 56)
- Party: Progressistas (since 2018)

Adriano Antônio Avelar (born 6 September 1969), better known as Adriano do Baldy, is a Brazilian politician serving as a member of the Chamber of Deputies since 2019. He previously served as chief of staff to Alexandre Baldy.
