= Louis Adrian =

French Army officer (1859–1933)

- Born: 29 August 1859; Metz, France
- Died: 8 August 1933 (aged 73); Val-de-Grace, France
- Military career
- Allegiance: France
- Branch: French Army
- Service years: 1880–1913, 1914–1920
- Rank: Divisional general
- Conflicts: World War I

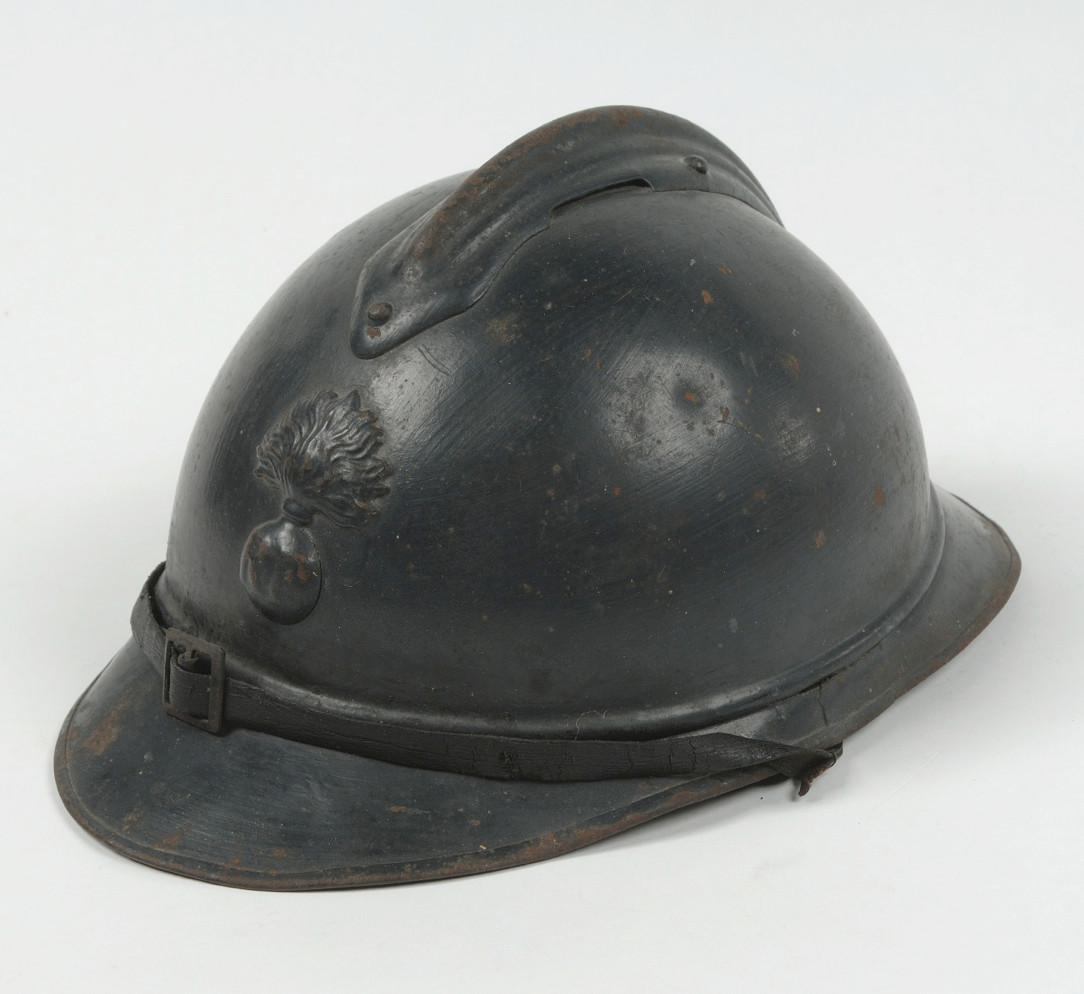
An Adrian helmet

Auguste Louis Adrian (29 August 1859 – 8 August 1933) was a French Army officer. His early career was spent as an engineer building military infrastructure in France and Madagascar. In 1898, he was appointed an instructor in military logistics, and in 1907, he was appointed director of supplies with a remit to reduce corruption in the supply chain. Fatigued by this role, he retired in 1913.

Adrian returned to the army at the start of the First World War and helped organise the taxis used to ferry reinforcements to the First Battle of the Marne. He was later assigned responsibility for military clothing and helped supply winter uniforms and armour for soldiers. This included a metal skull cap to be worn under the kepi. Adrian developed the skull cap into the Adrian helmet, which played an important role in reducing head injuries during trench warfare. Late in the war, Adrian helped to triangulate the locations of the Paris guns used by Germany to bombard the French capital. He finally retired in 1920.

== Early career ==
Auguste Louis Adrian was born in Metz in north-eastern France on 29 August 1859. He was the son of Jean Louis and Cornelie-Joseph Adrian and was raised as in the Roman Catholic faith. The Adrian family relocated to Tours in central France after Metz was annexed to the German Empire following the 1870–71 Franco-Prussian War. Adrian was awarded a scholarship to study at the Lycée Descartes in Tours, Indre-et-Loire, and from 1880 studied engineering at the École polytechnique in Paris.

On 1 October 1880, Adrian was commissioned into the French Army at the rank of second lieutenant to attend the Applied School of Artillery and Engineering at Fontainebleau. He was promoted to lieutenant on 1 October 1882 and posted to the 3rd (Arras) Engineer Regiment at the end of that month. On 12 February 1886, Adrian was promoted to captain to serve on the general staff. From this time he worked on constructing roads, bridges and coastal defences in France, including barracks on the English Channel coast. On 23 January 1889, Adrian married Marguerite Anna.

Adrian served on construction projects in French Madagascar from 12 March 1895 to 30 December 1895. He was appointed a chevalier of the Legion of Honour on 30 January 1896 and served as an instructor at the School of Military Administration in Valenciennes from 19 March 1898, with the appointment of sub-intendent third class (equivalent to the rank of Major) in the supplies service. In this period, Adrian wrote articles on military logistics and a manual for junior officers. He became senior sub-intendent for the army supplies service in Paris in 1900 and was advanced to sub-intendent second class (equivalent to the rank of lieutenant-colonel) in July 1904 and assigned to Arras, Pas-de-Calais.

In 1907, Adrian became the Ministry of War's director of supplies. He was tasked with eliminating fraud and corruption in the supply chain, a role which made him unpopular. Adrian was appointed a sub-intendent first class (equivalent to colonel) on 25 December 1908. He was appointed an officer of the Legion of Honour on 31 December 1912 and by 1913 had also been appointed a commander of the Order of the Star of Anjouan. Fatigued by his anti-corruption role, Adrian requested retirement, which was granted on 1 May 1913. He afterwards lived in Genêts in north-west France; in retirement, Adrian designed a pre-fabricated hut for use by ranchers in Venezuela, designed to be frequently disassembled and relocated.

== First World War ==
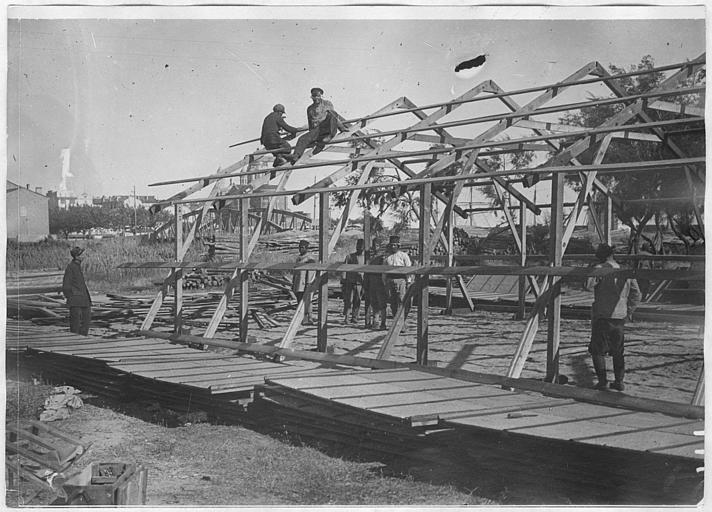
An Adrian hut under construction in Madagscar

In the lead up to the First World War, Adrian returned to active duty on 2 August 1914, the day before the German declaration of war on France. During the early part of the war he served as a deputy director in the Supply Corps. During the First Battle of the Marne in early September 1914, Adrian helped to organise the transport of reinforcements to the front by Parisian taxis. He was also responsible for saving 4,000 tonnes (4,400 tons) of textiles from Lille before it was occupied by German forces that October.

In 1915, Adrian was appointed inspector general of clothing, holding the role until 28 November 1916. He reformed the manufacture of uniforms and arranged supply of sheepskin capes and trench boots for the first winter of the war. Also in 1915, recognising the shortage of canvas for the manufacture of tents, Adrian developed his prefabricated Venezuela sheds into the "Adrian hut" for use by the French army. Twenty factories were established to manufacture the huts, which saw widespread use in rest camps in France, Africa, Salonika and Corfu and as temporary post-war accommodation.

With artillery responsible for two-thirds of the French army's fatalities, Adrian developed a metal skull cap to be worn inside the cloth kepi. Some 700,000 were made by early 1915 and were shown to provide protection against 60% of shrapnel strikes. In April 1915, Adrian developed the skull cap into a new brimmed steel helmet, which became known as the Adrian helmet. Some 7 million were produced within a year and it was used by the French, Russian, Romanian, Serbian, Belgian and Italian armies. The introduction of the helmet led to a reduction in head injuries in the army and Adrian was rewarded by appointment as commander of the Legion of Honour on 28 October 1915. He also developed abdominal armour as protection against barbed wire and bayonet thrusts, infantry shoulder armour, armoured aircraft seats and new straps for the French army backpack.

Adrian was appointed inspector-general of cantonments (equivalent to the rank of divisional general) on 26 June 1917, with responsibility for refugees and repatriation. In 1918, he helped to triangulate the locations of the German Paris Guns used to bombard the capital. Adrian transferred to the reserve of officers in August 1918.

== Later life ==
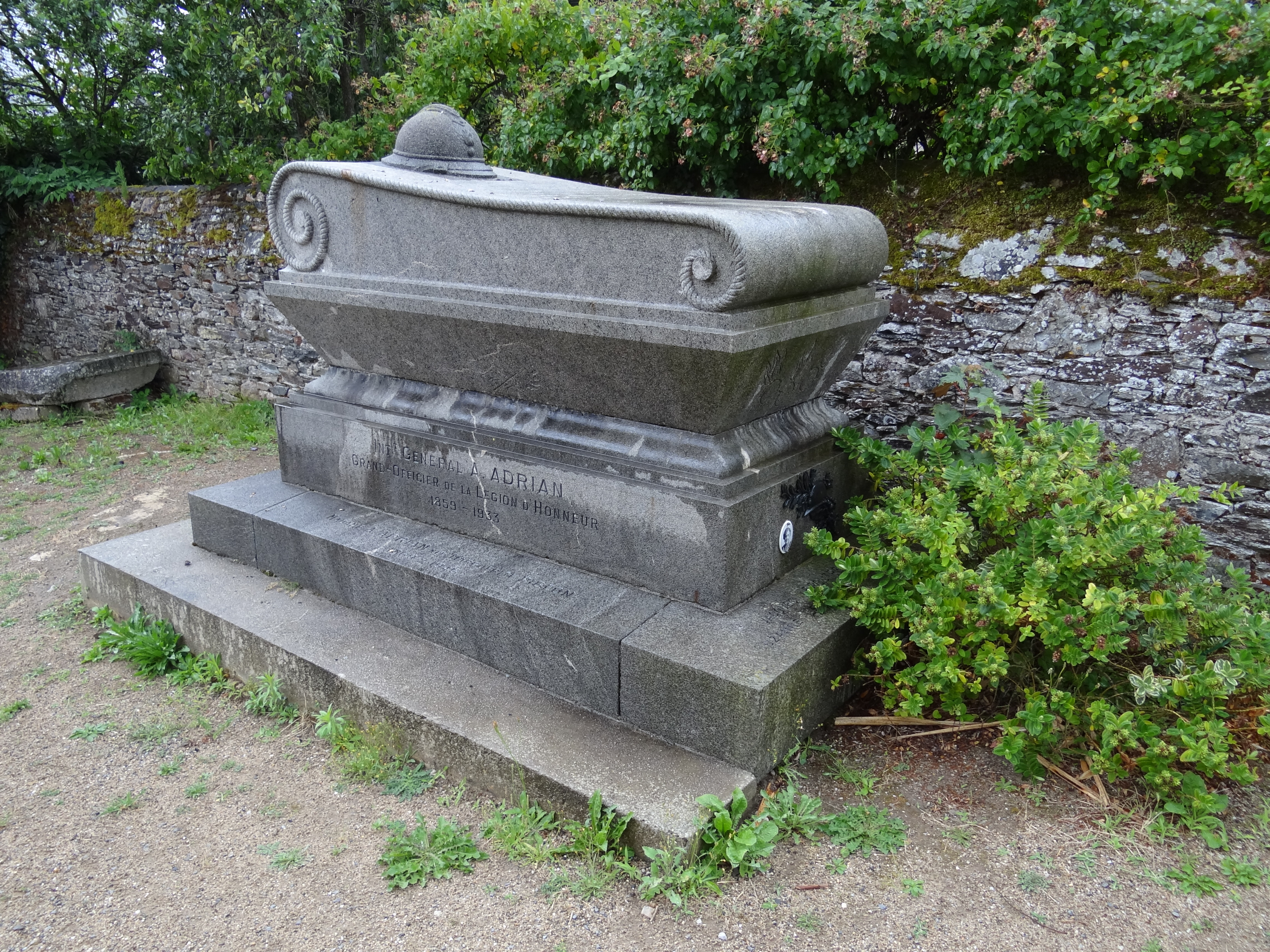
Adrian's tomb

Adrian returned to the army as a general on 2 March 1919. He was appointed a grand officer of the Legion of Honour on 16 June 1920, shortly before his final retirement to Genêts. Adrian died at Val-de-Grace on 8 August 1933. He is buried in Genêts, where his tomb is topped with a representation of the Adrian helmet.
