= Phil Adrian =

Canadian football player (born c. 1933)

Profile
- Positions: Halfback, Fullback, FW, Linebacker

Personal information
- Born: c. 1933 (age 92–93); Hamilton, Ontario, Canada
- Listed height: 6 ft 0 in (1.83 m)
- Listed weight: 195 lb (88 kg)

Career information
- High school: Montreal (QC) Westhill

Career history
- 1951–1954: Montreal Alouettes

Phil Adrian (born c. 1933) is a Canadian former professional football player who played for the Montreal Alouettes. He played in 39 games for the Alouettes over four seasons from 1951 to 1954.
