= Charles R. Adrian =

American political science professor

- Born: Charles Raymomd Adrian; March 12, 1922; Portland, Oregon, U.S.
- Died: May 28, 2004 (aged 82); Riverside, California, U.S.
- Education: B.A Cornell College (1947): M.A University of Minnesota (1948); Ph.D University of Minnesota (1950)
- Title: Professor Emeritus of Political Science
- Spouse: Audrey Jean Nelson (m. 1946; died 2004)
- Awards: LL.D Cornell College (1973)

Charles Raymond Adrian (March 12, 1922 – May 28, 2004) was an American professor of political science who specialized in municipal politics.

== Early life and education ==
In December 1924, Adrian's mother sued his father for divorce and custody of Adrian and his sister, Marian. After his parents' divorce Adrian relocated with his mother and sister to his mother's hometown of Davenport, Iowa. Having been dissuaded against pursuing music while still a high school student, Adrian pursued political science at Cornell College. With the US entrance into World War II, Adrian enlisted in the United States Army Air Forces in 1943 where he served in the Weather Wing. After his military service ended in 1946, Adrian returned to Cornell College, graduating in 1947 with a Bachelor's degree. Adrian was elected a member of Phi Beta Kappa at Cornell. Adrian met his future wife Audrey Nelson, a euphonium player, at a concert in Iowa. Her father was a physics professor at Cornell. They married in 1946. Adrian immediately enrolled at the University of Minnesota to study urban politics under William Anderson. He completed his master's degree in 1948 and his doctorate in 1950. Adrian accepted a post-doctoral fellowship in 1954 from the Ford Foundation and attended the University of Copenhagen to study the developing welfare state there.

== Career ==
For many years, [Adrian's] textbooks were among the top two or three, easily, in the field of urban politics ... He was particularly important in the study of urban institutions, examining the impact of non partisanship and direct democracy on local government. His stature in the department was very important in attracting top faculty and graduate students.

— Professor Max Neiman

Adrian started teaching at Wayne University in 1949. After returning from his post-doctoral fellowship in the Summer of 1955 he started teaching at Michigan State University in 1955. Through 1956 and 1957 he served as an administrative assistant to G. Mennen Williams, then Governor of Michigan. During his time in Michigan Adrian wrote two articles, Some General Characteristics of Nonpartisan Elections and A Typology for Nonpartisan Elections, that are considered the seminal works in the study of non-partisanship. Adrian wrote a third, The Origin of Minnesota's Nonpartisan Legislature, specifically discussing the "political accident" of nonpartisanship in the Minnesota Legislature. Adrian was promoted to associate professor in 1957 and again to chair of the political science department in 1963.

Adrian was recruited by fellow University of Minnesota-alum Ivan Hinderaker, the Chancellor of University of California, Riverside (UCR), to join the faculty. Adrian served as chair of the political science department from 1966 until his retirement on June 30, 1988 as the effects of his diabetes hampered his ability to teach. Adrian's 1977 book, Governing Urban America, was considered the most cited textbook in the field of urban politics.

Adrian was a member of the American Political Science Association, the American Society for Public Administration and the American Association of University Professors.

== Death ==
Adrian died of complications from diabetes on May 28, 2004.

== Selected published works ==
- Adrian, Charles R. (September 1952). "Some General Characteristics of Nonpartisan Elections". The American Political Science Review. 46 (3). American Political Science Association: 766–776. doi:10.2307/1952283. JSTOR 1952283.
- Adrian, Charles R. (June 1959). "A Typology for Nonpartisan Elections". The Western Political Quarterly. 12 (2). Western Political Science Association: 449–458. doi:10.2307/443982. JSTOR 443982.
- Williams, Oliver P.; Adrian, Charles R. (1959). "The insulation of local politics under the non-partisan ballot". The American Political Science Review. 53 (4): 1052–1063. doi:10.2307/1952074. JSTOR 1952074.
- Governing our fifty States and their communities. New York: McGraw-Hill. 1972.
- Governing urban America. New York: McGraw-Hill. 1977. ISBN 0070004463.
- A History of American City Government: The Emergence of the Metropolis, 1920–1945. University Press of America. 1987. ISBN 9780819166494.
