= Tomás Adriano =

Mexican footballer (born 1977)

Tomas Adriano
Personal information
- Full name: Tomás Adriano de León
- Date of birth: 14 October 1977 (age 49)
- Place of birth: Torreón, Coahuila, Mexico
- Height: 1.80 m (5 ft 11 in)
- Position: Goalkeeper

Senior career*
Years	Team	Apps	(Gls)
2001–2002	Santos Laguna	10	(0)
2004	Club León	11	(0)
2005–2010	Dorados de Sinaloa	78	(0)
2010	Veracruz	10	(0)
2011–2012	CF La Piedad	16	(0)
2012–2013	Dorados de Sinaloa	4	(0)
- * Club domestic league appearances and goals as of 30 July 2013

Tomás Adriano de León (born October 14, 1977) is a former Mexican football player who plays the role of goalkeeper. He played for Santos Laguna, Club León and Dorados de Sinaloa.
