= Barbara Adrian =

American painter

- Born: Barbara Love Adrian; July 25, 1931; New York City, New York, United States
- Died: February 2, 2014 (aged 82)
- Other names: Barbara Tramutola Adrian
- Education: Hunter College, Columbia University, Art Students League of New York
- Employer: Art Students League of New York
- Spouse: Franklin Creighton Tramutola (m. 1972–)

Barbara Love Adrian (July 25, 1931 – February 2, 2014) was an American visual artist and educator, known for her paintings.

== Life ==
Adrian was born on July 25, 1931, in New York City, the daughter of Mildred Brown and Allen Isaac Adrian (born as Adrachinsky). Her grandparents parents were Jewish emigrants from the Russian Empire.

Adrian graduated from Hunter College, and Columbia University. She also studied under Reginald Marsh at the Art Students League of New York starting in 1947, and later served as his assistant.

She taught at the Art Students League of New York, from 1968 to 2011.

In 1972, Adrian married lawyer Franklin Creighton Tramutola.

== Exhibitions ==
- 1966, Barbara Adrian: Recent Paintings and Drawings, Banfer Gallery, New York City, New York
- 1975, An American Dream World: Romantic Realism, 1930–1955, Whitney Museum of American Art, New York City, New York
