= Adriano (footballer, born October 1985) =

Brazilian footballer

Personal information
- Full name: Francisco Adriano da Silva Rodrigues
- Date of birth: 14 October 1985 (age 41)
- Place of birth: Belo Horizonte, Brazil
- Height: 1.80 m (5 ft 11 in)
- Position: Forward

Senior career*
Years	Team	Apps	(Gls)
2004	Cruzeiro		
2005	Ipatinga		
2006	América-MG		
2006	Cruzeiro		
2006–2009	Nacional da Madeira		
2008–2009	→ Boavista (loan)		
- * Club domestic league appearances and goals

Francisco Adriano da Silva Rodrigues, commonly known as Adriano (born 14 October 1985), is a Brazilian former professional footballer who played as a forward.

== Career ==
Adriano played two Copa do Brasil games in 2006 defending América-MG. He has also played for Cruzeiro, Ipatinga and Nacional da Madeira, and was transferred to Boavista in 2008.
