= Adriano Costa (artist) =

Brazilian artist (born 1975)

Adriano Costa (born 1975) is a Brazilian contemporary artist who works in sculpture, installation, and painting. He has had solo exhibitions in international cities such as São Paulo, Vienna, London, Milan, Los Angeles, Cologne, Porto, and New York. His work is also in the permanent collection of Solomon R. Guggenheim Museum, New York; Pinacoteca de Estado de São Paulo; Sandretto Re Rebaudengo Collection, Turin, Italy; and the Boros Collection, Berlin, among others. Costa is a three-time PIPA Prize nominee (2012, 2013, and 2016).

Costa was born and raised in São Paulo, where he graduated with a BA in art from University of São Paulo, and where he resides and works.

Throughout Costa's work, there is a theme of reusing and reinterpreting everyday objects and detritus to showcase both the raw and the beautiful aspects of urban neighbourhoods, the commodification of art and the – in his eyes – erroneous idea of separation of ephemera and art. He attempts to elevate the objects to the same position of importance as any artwork.
