= Adriano (footballer, born 1969) =

Brazilian footballer

Adriano Silva Francisco
Personal information
- Full name: Adriano Silva Francisco
- Date of birth: 7 February 1969 (age 57)
- Place of birth: Petrópolis, Brazil
- Height: 1.86 m (6 ft 1 in)
- Position: Goalkeeper

Youth career
- Flamengo

Senior career*
Years	Team	Apps	(Gls)
1993–1995	Flamengo	10	(0)
2004–2006	Volta Redonda	6	(0)
2006	America-RJ	3	(0)
2006	Olaria		
2007–2010	Friburguense	1	(0)
2007	→ Duque de Caxias (loan)		
2008	→ Nova Iguaçu (loan)		
2009	→ Goytacaz (loan)		
- * Club domestic league appearances and goals

Adriano Silva Francisco (born 7 February 1969), known as Adriano, is a Brazilian former professional footballer who played as a goalkeeper.

== Biography ==
=== Career ===
In 1999, he was selected by Brazil League XI for the Thai Four-Nation Tournament .

In October 2004, he signed a contract until 30 June 2006 for Volta Redonda. He played for the club at 2005 Campeonato Brasileiro Série C, and in 2006 Copa do Brasil.

In 2005 Brasileiro Série C, he missed the first two matches, but ahead of Lázaro in the remaining six matches.

On 1 July 2006, he signed a contract until the end of the year for America-RJ, where he played three matches in 2006 Campeonato Brasileiro Série C (another three played by Fábio Noronha).

After the club failed the qualify for the second stage, he left for Olaria for Campeonato Carioca Second Division.

On 10 January 2007, he signed a contract with Friburguense until the end of 2007 Campeonato Carioca. His contract was extended in June 2007 for 2007 Campeonato Brasileiro Série C. He was the backup of Léo.

After the team failed to qualify to the next round, he was loaned to Duque de Caxias until the end of the year for the 2007 Campeonato Carioca 2nd Division. The team finished 5th of the fourth stage (a total of eight teams in the 4th stage, Duque de Caxias finished as the first in the group for 5th to 8th place)

In January 2008, he signed a new 7-months deal with Friburguense. After the end of 2008, Campeonato Carioca extended his contract until the end of 2008 and loaned to Nova Iguaçu for 2008 Campeonato Carioca 2nd Division.

In January 2009, he signed a contract extension with Friburguense, until 30 April 2010. He was the backup keeper of Marcos at 2009 Campeonato Brasileiro Série D and played the last group stage match against Paulista He then left for Goytacaz for the remaining Campeonato Carioca Serie B matches.

He was released after 2010 Campeonato Carioca.

== Titles ==
Flamengo

- Copa São Paulo de Futebol Júnior: 1990
- Copa do Brasil: 1990

Friburguense

- Troféu João Ellis Filho: 2009
