= Barranca =

Barranca (Spanish for "canyon" or "ravine"), may refer to:

== Geography ==
=== Argentina ===
- Barranca Yaco, Viceroyalty of the Río de la Plata, Argentina

=== Chile ===
- Barrancas, Pichilemu, a village in Pichilemu

=== Colombia ===
- Barrancas, La Guajira, town and municipality of the Colombian Department of La Guajira
- Barranca de Upía, a town and municipality in the Meta Department, Colombia
- Barrancabermeja, Colombia

=== Costa Rica ===
- Barranca, a district of Puntarenas, Costa Rica

=== Guatemala ===
- Barranca Grande, a city in San Marcos Department, Guatemala
- La Barranca, an aldea of Colotenango, in Huehuetenango, Guatemala
- Aldea La Barranca, Cunén, Guatemala
- Barranca Honda, Jutiapa, Guatemala
- Barranca Seca, Zacapa, Guatemala
- Barrancas, Chiquimula, Guatemala
- Barranca, Izabal, Guatemala
- Barrancas de Galvez, a city in San Marcos Department, Guatemala

=== Mexico ===
- Barranca de Otates, a pueblo in Zacoalco municipality, Jalisco, Mexico
- Barranca del Cobre ("Copper Canyon"), Mexico
- Metro Barranca del Muerto, metro station in Mexico City

=== Peru ===
- Barranca District, Datem del Marañón in the Loreto Region
- Barranca District, Barranca in the Lima Region
- Barranca Province in the Lima Region
- Barranca, Lima

=== United States ===
- Barranca, a town in Rio Arriba County, New Mexico, USA
- Barrancas National Cemetery, a United States National Cemetery located at Naval Air Station Pensacola, in the city of Pensacola, Florida
- Fort Barrancas, in the Warrington area of Pensacola, Florida
- The Barranca, in Newbury Park, California

== Fiction ==
- Las Barrancas, a fictional town in a fictional county in the computer game, Grand Theft Auto: San Andreas
- The guide Barranca in the opening scenes of Raiders of the Lost Ark
- The setting of the 1939 Howard Hawks film Only Angels Have Wings

== Music ==
- La Barranca rock group from Mexico City

== See also ==
- Baranca (disambiguation)
