= Barrancas =

Barrancas may refer to:

- Barrancas, Neuquén, Argentina
- Barrancas, Pichilemu, Chile
- Barrancas, La Guajira, Colombia
- Barrancas del Orinoco, Venezuela
- Barrancas metro station, in Santiago, Chile
- Barrancas River, in Argentina
- Fort Barrancas, Pensacola, Florida, United States

== See also ==
- Barranca (disambiguation)
