= Alejandro González (Peruvian footballer) =

Peruvian footballer (1915–1953)

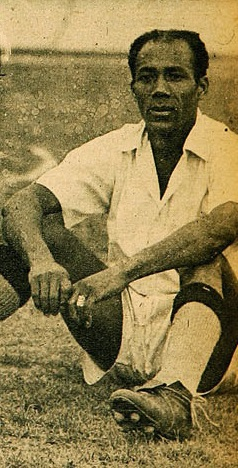

Personal information
- Full name: Alejandro González Ramírez
- Date of birth: 17 March 1915
- Place of birth: Paramonga, Peru
- Date of death: 5 July 1953 (aged 38)
- Place of death: Trujillo, Peru
- Position: Midfielder

Senior career*
Years	Team	Apps	(Gls)
1934–1938	Sport Paramonga		
1939–1940	Sporting Tabaco		
1941	Sucre FC		
1942–1943	Alfonso Ugarte (Chiclín)		
1943	Sucre FC		
1944–1949	Alianza Lima		
1950–1951	América de Cali		
1951	Alianza Lima		
1952–1953	Juan Aurich		

International career
1941–1949	Peru	14	(0)
- * Club domestic league appearances and goals

Alejandro González Ramírez (17 March 1915 – 5 July 1953) was a Peruvian professional footballer who played as midfielder.

== Playing career ==
=== Club career ===
Nicknamed Patrullero (the patrolman), Alejandro González made his debut for Sport Paramonga in his hometown in 1934. In 1939, he joined Sporting Tabaco, where he established himself as a central midfielder. After a stint with Sucre FC in 1941, he signed with Alfonso Ugarte de Chiclín, where he played between 1942 and 1943.

His career took a turn when he signed with Alianza Lima in 1944. Initially Gerardo Arce's backup, he quickly became a regular in midfield, to the point that coach Adelfo Magallanes included him in the starting eleven after Alianza's tour of Chile. He won his only Peruvian championship in 1948.

In the 1950s, he moved to Colombia, playing for América de Cali, a team that included several Peruvian players. However, América failed to live up to expectations, finishing only 10th in the 1950 championship, 15 points behind champions Once Caldas. He returned to Peru the following year.

Returning to Alianza Lima in 1951, he managed the club as a player-manager. In 1952, he moved to Juan Aurich. As player-manager of his new club, he died on 5 July 1953, in a car accident along with 22 other people.

As a tribute, the Paramonga stadium is named after him.

=== International career ===
Peruvian international Alejandro González received 14 caps (no goals scored) between 1941 and 1949. He participated in the South American championships of 1941 (one match), 1947 (six matches) and 1949 (seven matches).

== Honours ==
Alianza Lima

- Peruvian Primera División: 1948
- Campeonato de Apertura (2): 1947, 1949
