= Paramonga, Peru =

Paramonga
- Town
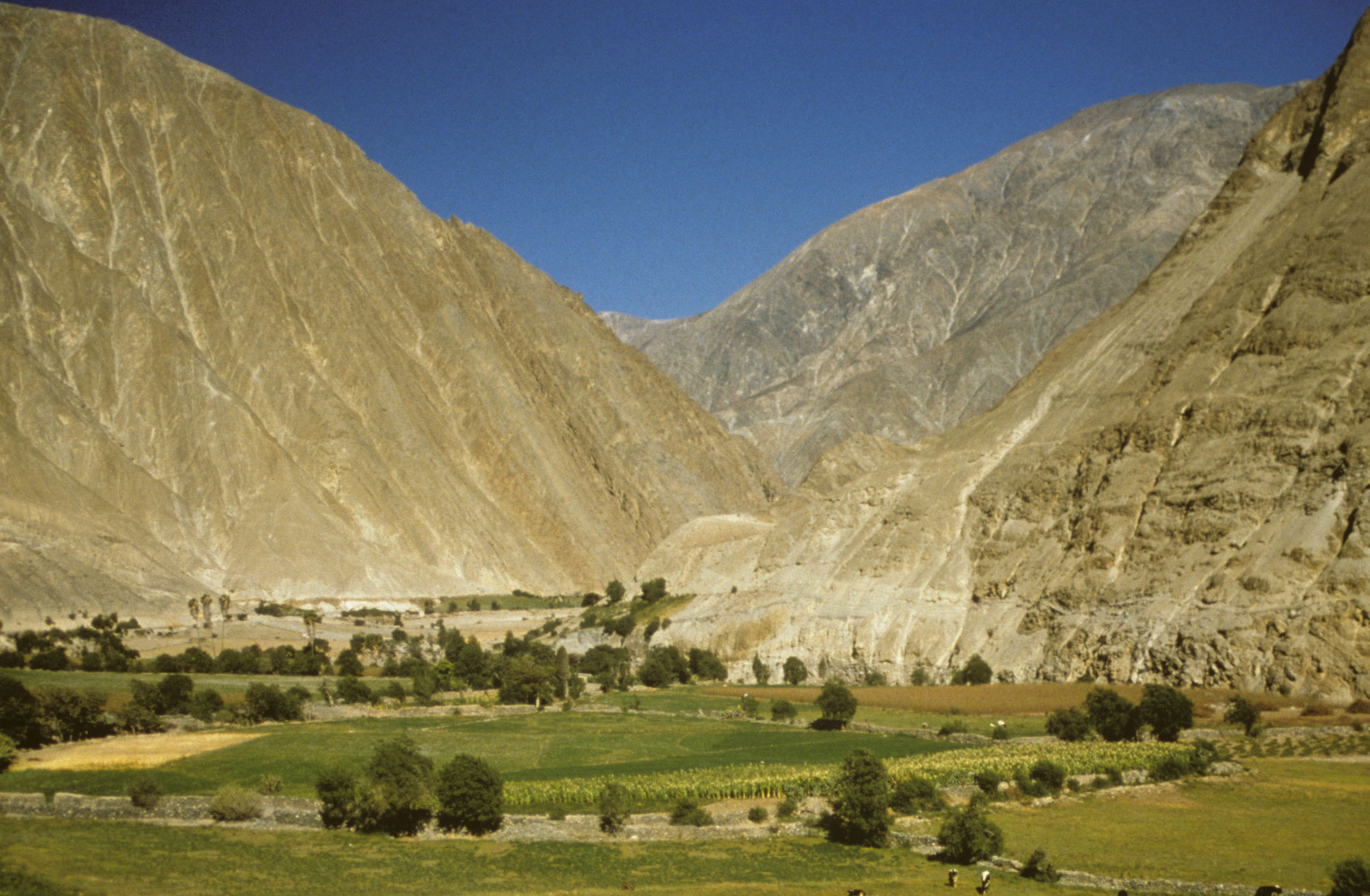

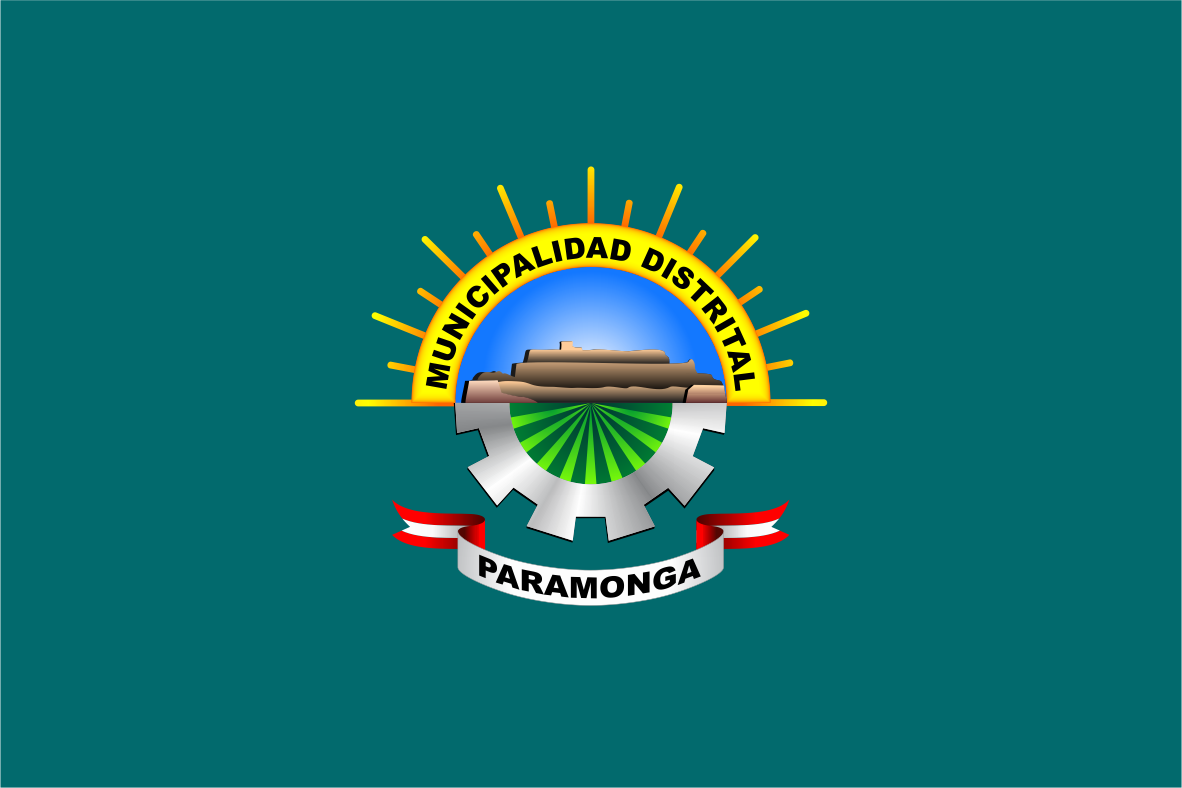
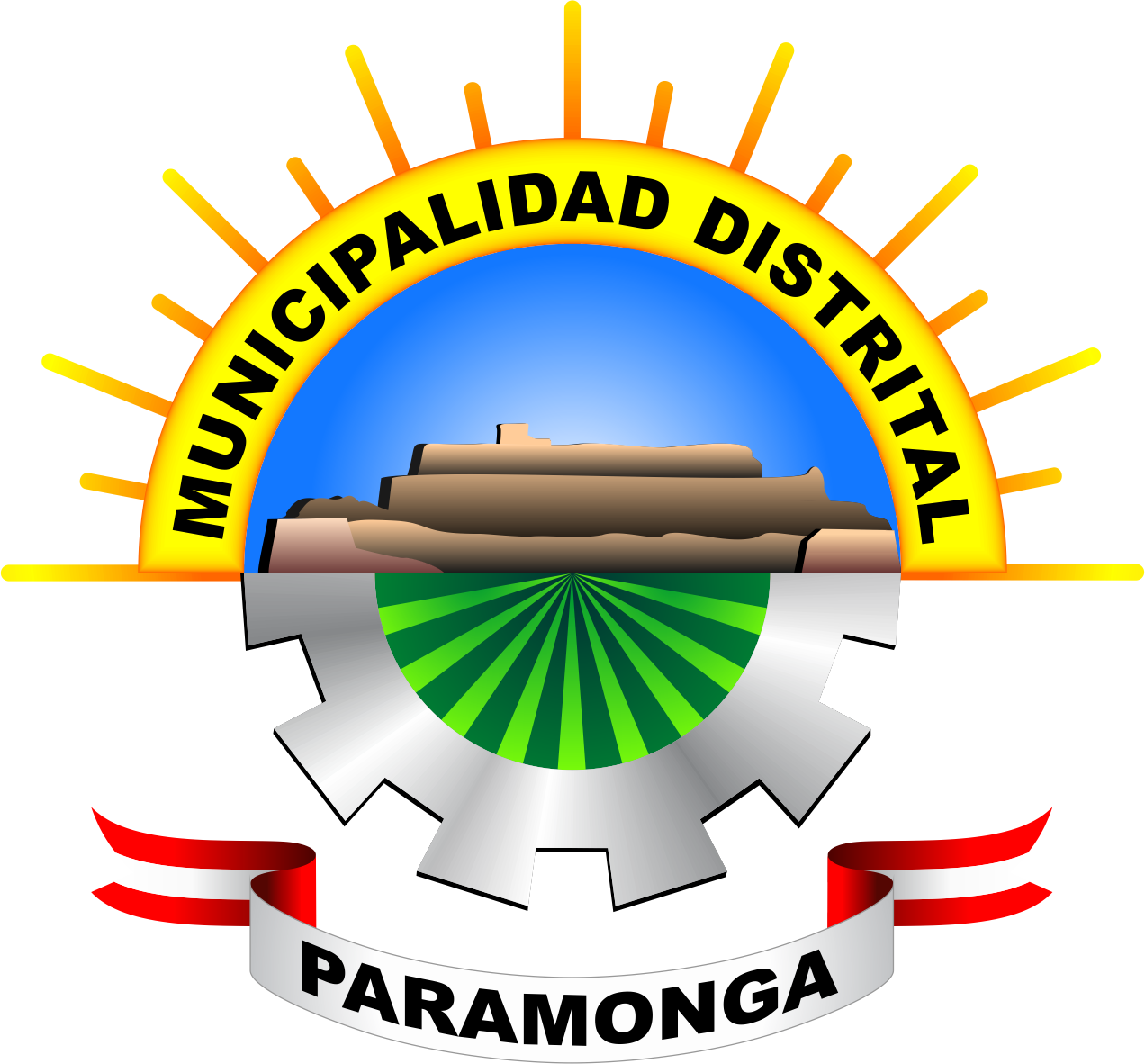
- Flag Seal

- Location within Peru
- Coordinates: 10°40′28″S 77°49′7″W
- Country: Peru
- Region: Lima
- Province: Barranca
- District: Paramonga

Government
  - Mayor: Eduardo Garcia Pagador (2019-2022)
- Elevation: 13 m (43 ft)

Population (2017)
  - Total: 21,453
- Time zone: UTC-5 (PET)
- Website: www.muniparamonga.gob.pe

Paramonga is a town in central Peru, capital of the district of Paramonga in the province of Barranca in the Department of Lima.

== Etymology ==
The word paramonga comes from the Mochica language spoken by the people that lived in the north coast, who settled in the Fortaleza Valley. Its meaning is the following:

- para (vassals)
- monga (here)

The translation would be "vassals from around here".

If the thesis of Torero were accepted, supporting that the Quechua language arose here, "paramonga" would come from para = rain and munqa = verbal ending of occurrence, i.e., "it's going to rain", according to scholar César Guardia Mayorga.
