= Baranga =

Baranga may refer to:

- Baranga (river), in Romania
- Aurel Baranga, Romanian playwright

== See also ==
- Barang (disambiguation)
- Baranca (disambiguation)
- Bangaranga
