= Laguna Sur metro station =

Santiago metro station

Laguna Sur
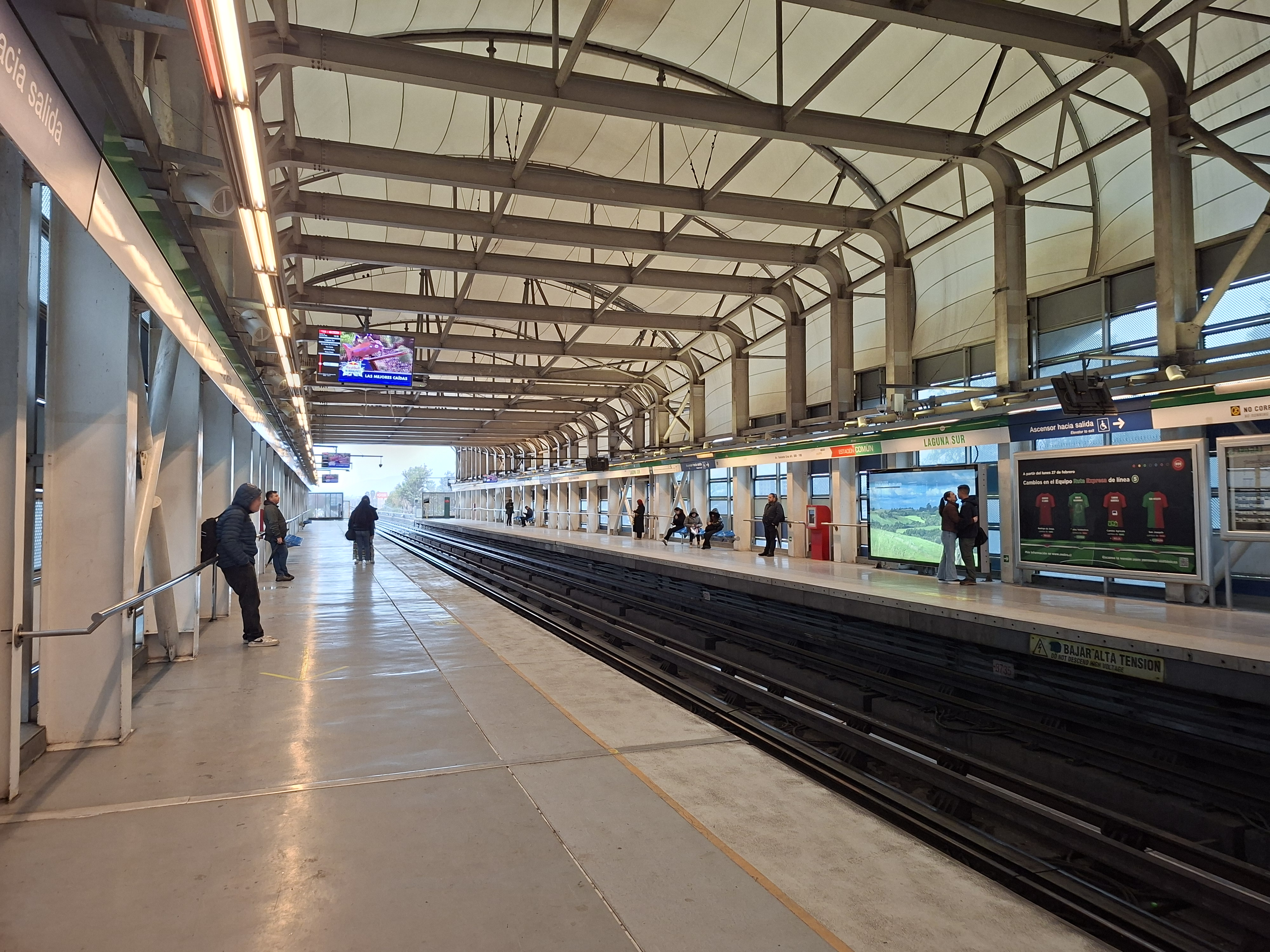
- Station platform

General information
- Location: Teniente Cruz Avenue / Laguna Sur Street
- Coordinates: 33°27′44.47″S 70°44′16.51″W
- System: Santiago rapid transit
- Line: Line 5
- Platforms: 2 side platforms
- Tracks: 2
- Connections: Transantiago buses

Construction
- Accessible: yes

History
- Opened: February 3, 2011

Services
Preceding station	Santiago Metro	Following station
Las Parcelas towards Plaza de Maipú	Line 5	Barrancas towards Vicente Valdés
Location

Laguna Sur station is an underground metro station on the Line 5 of Santiago Metro network, in Santiago, Chile. It is located underneath the junction of Teniente Cruz Avenue with Laguna Sur Street, in the commune of Pudahuel between Las Parcelas station (1,140 meters away) and Barrancas station (1,140 meters away).

The station was opened on 3 February 2011 as part of the extension of the line from Pudahuel to Plaza de Maipú. It is one of three stations on the elevated viaduct extension of the line to Maipú.

The station structure consists of two parts: the platforms, located on an elevated viaduct, and the ticket office and entrance points on the Teniente Cruz Avenue / Laguna Sur Street junction. The platforms and ticket office are linked by a footbridge over Teniente Cruz Avenue.

The surrounding area is mainly residential,

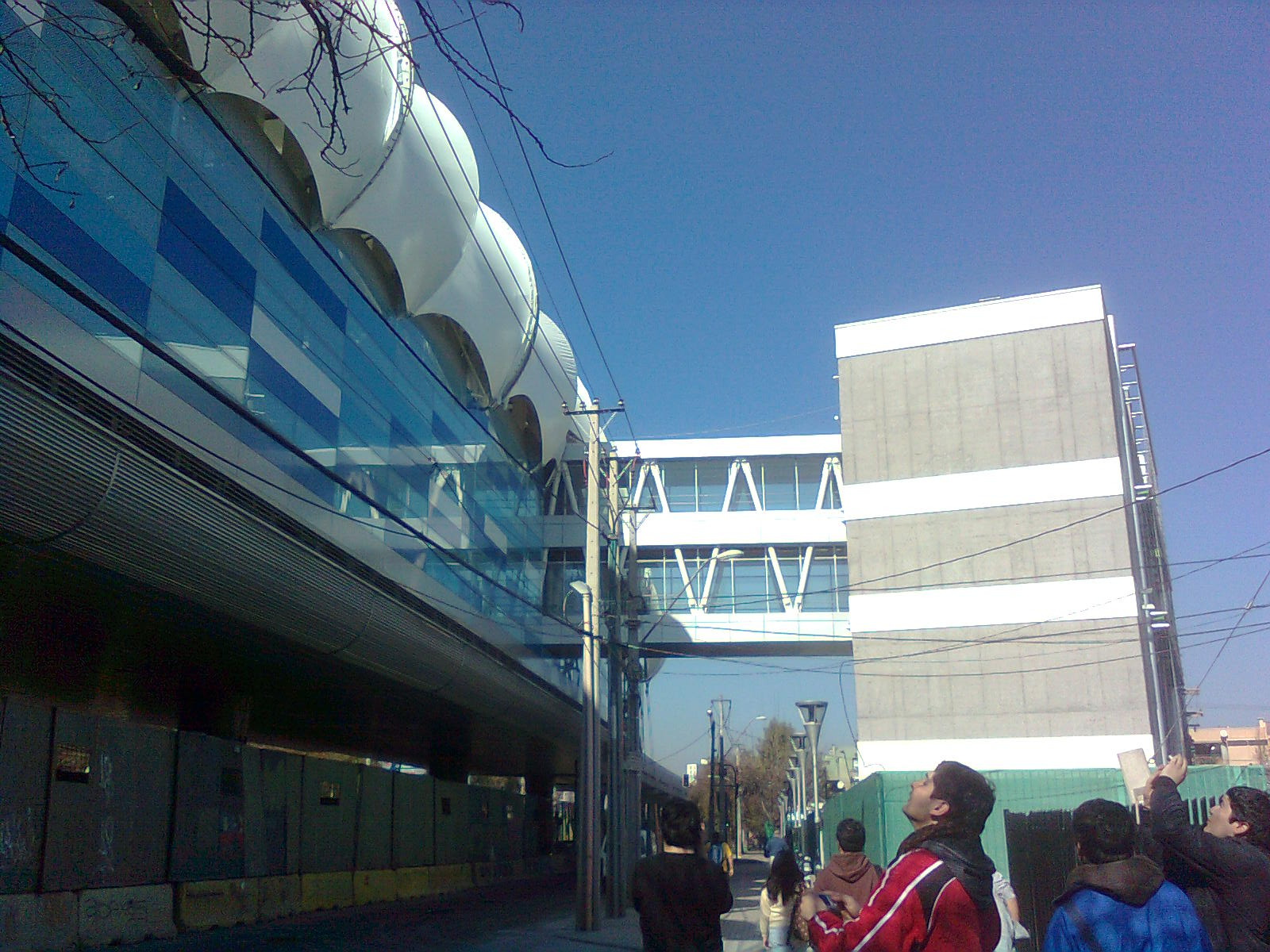
Laguna Sur station.

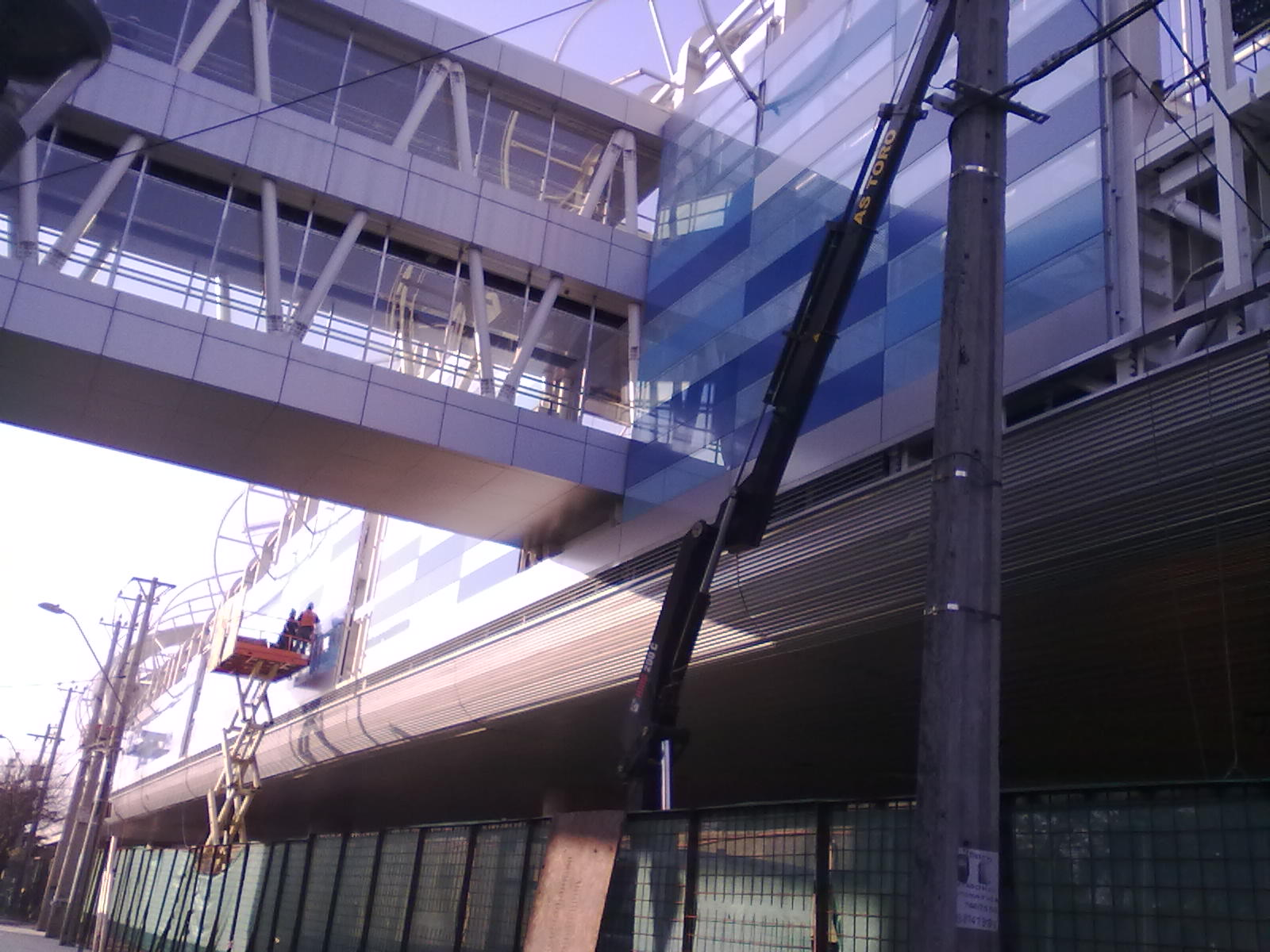
Final works on Laguna Sur station

== Etymology ==
The station is named after Laguna Sur Street, where it is located.

== History ==
In 2005, Chilean president Ricardo Lagos announced the extension of Line 5 to Maipú. Works began on Laguna Sur station in 2006 and were completed two years later. Construction of the full line extension was completed in 2010 and on October 5, 2010, the first train passed along the station's tracks. Laguna Sur station was finally inaugurated on February 3, 2011, by Chilean president Sebastián Piñera along with the rest of stations on the line extension between Barrancas and Plaza de Maipú stations. The station has been a catalyst for significant change and development in the area, with improvements in the public lighting, resurfacing of the streets surrounding the station and new residential and commercial development projects.
