= Supe Puerto =

- Town
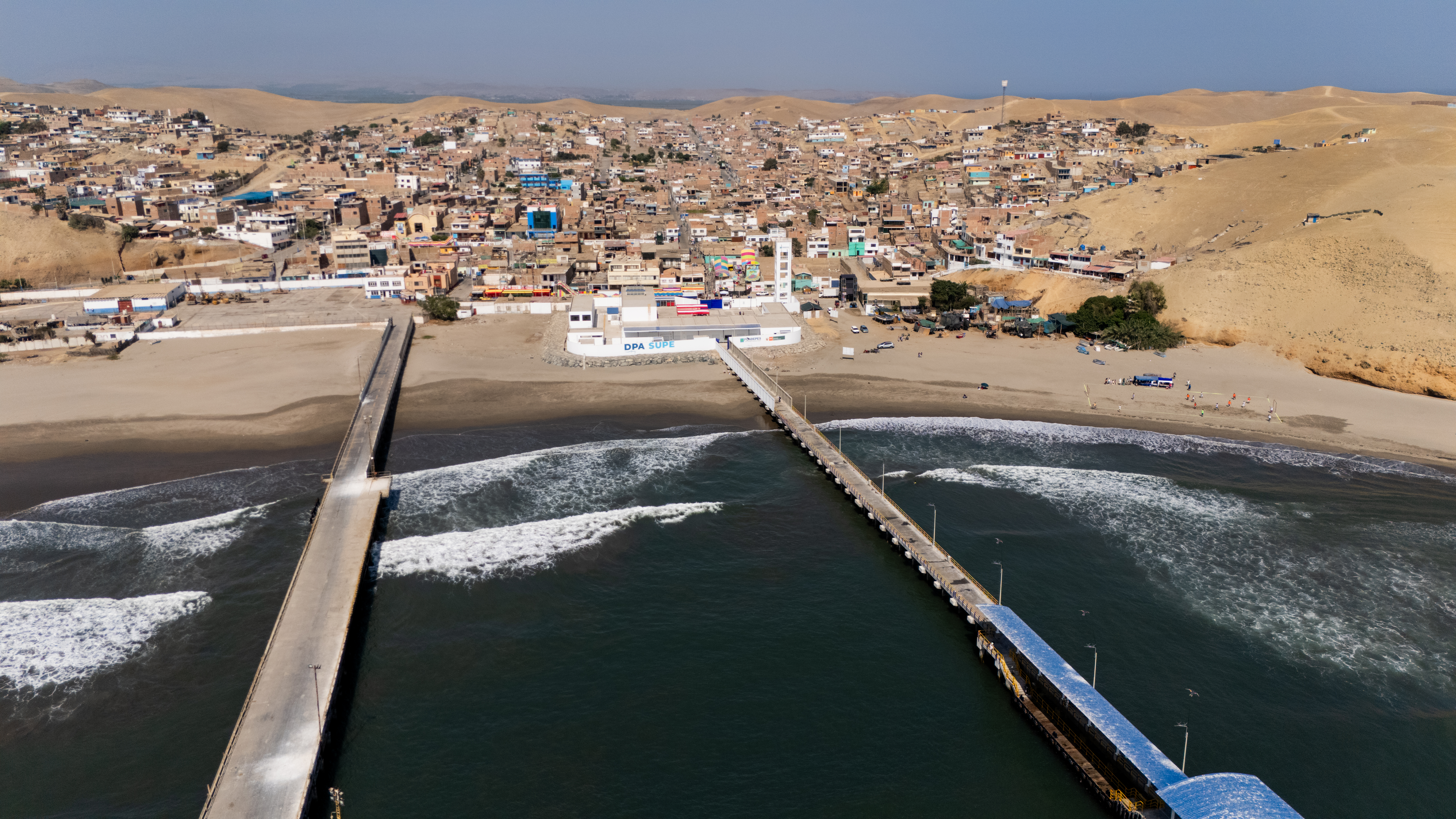
- Aerial view of Supe Puerto in 2026

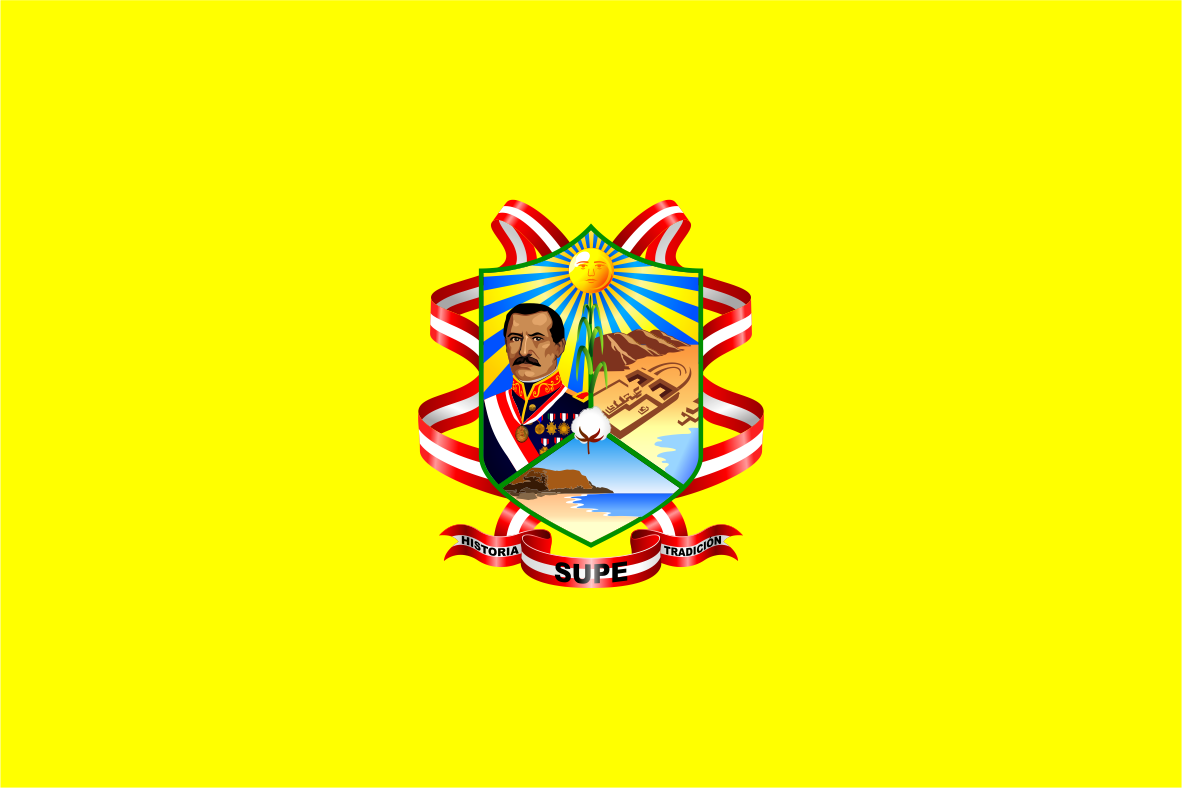
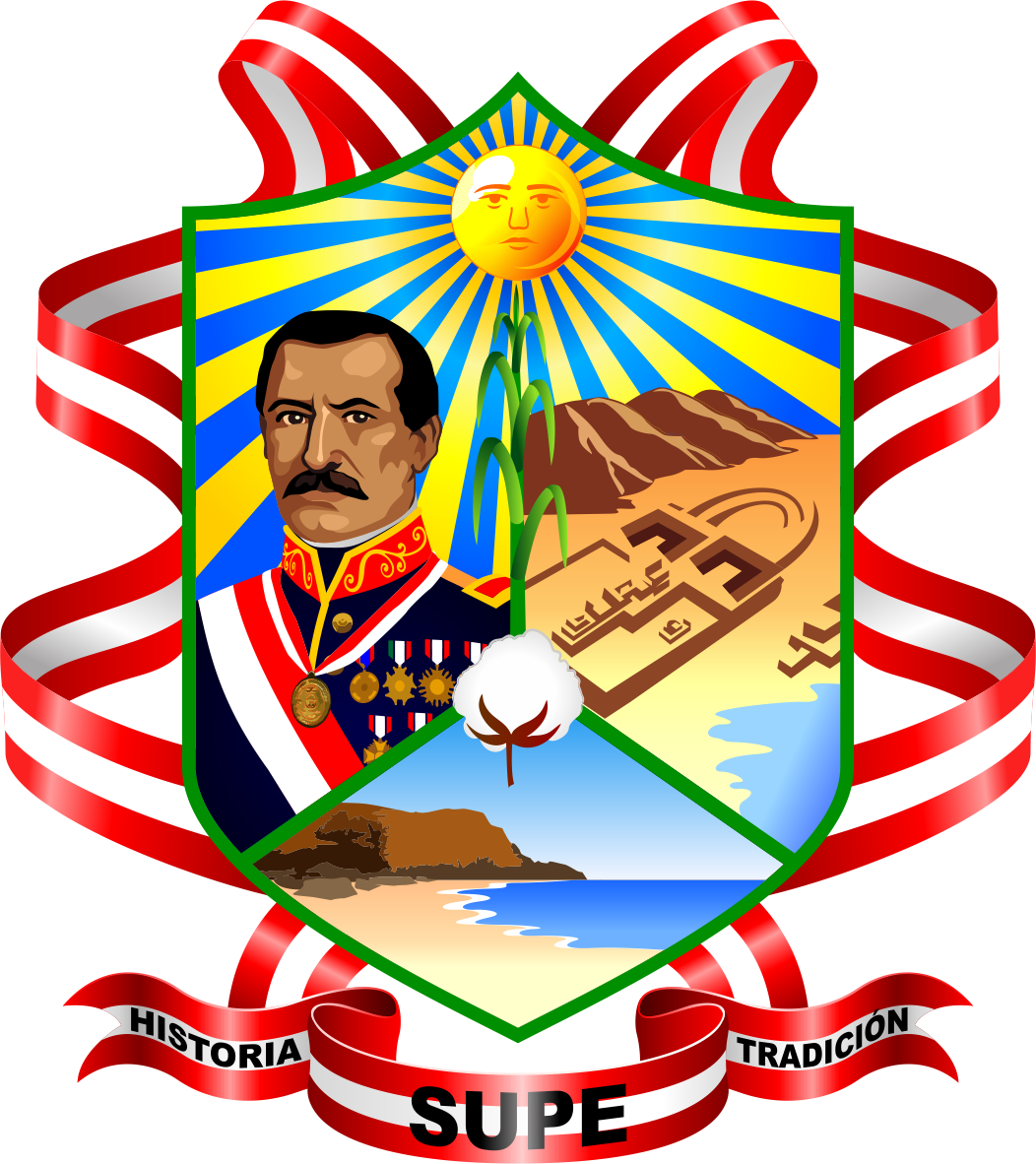
- Flag Seal

- Location within Peru
- Coordinates: 10°48′06″S 77°44′37″W
- Country: Peru
- Region: Lima
- Province: Barranca
- District: Supe Puerto

Government
  - Mayor: Luis Alberto Sosa Hidalgo (2019-2022)
- Elevation: 45 m (148 ft)

Population (2015)
  - Total: 28,286
- Time zone: UTC-5 (PET)
- Website: www.munisupe.gob.pe

Puerto Supe, officially known as Supe Puerto (to distinguish it from the neighboring district of Supe Pueblo, a separate municipality), is a small harbor town located in the province of Barranca, in the Lima Provincias region, on the coast of Peru. It is located approximately 190 km north of Lima, and is part of the Supe Valley.

Puerto Supe is known for having one of the oldest archaeological sites in the Americas. The archaeological site of El Áspero has been dated at over 3000 BCE, and is part of a complex of 20 sites spread throughout the Supe Valley that constitute the oldest known civilization in the Americas: The Norte Chico, or Caral-Supe, civilization.

The town also boasts a lighthouse and a virtually intact, protected beach where the main attraction is a tidal island known as Isla del Faraón (Pharaoh's Island) that is surrounded by water as the tide rises in the late afternoon (cf. Mont Saint-Michel in Normandy, France). In recent years, however, the sea seems to have receded (or the ground risen), so that the water now forms an island only occasionally, on the highest tides.

== Climate ==
Climate data for Supe
Month	Jan	Feb	Mar	Apr	May	Jun	Jul	Aug	Sep	Oct	Nov	Dec	Year
Mean daily maximum °C (°F)	25.8 (78.4)	26.8 (80.2)	26.4 (79.5)	25 (77)	22.6 (72.7)	21.2 (70.2)	20.6 (69.1)	20 (68)	20.2 (68.4)	21.1 (70.0)	22.6 (72.7)	24.4 (75.9)	23.1 (73.5)
Daily mean °C (°F)	21.4 (70.5)	22.4 (72.3)	22 (72)	20.7 (69.3)	18.6 (65.5)	17.5 (63.5)	16.9 (62.4)	16.3 (61.3)	16.4 (61.5)	17.1 (62.8)	18.4 (65.1)	19.8 (67.6)	19.0 (66.1)
Mean daily minimum °C (°F)	17.1 (62.8)	18 (64)	17.6 (63.7)	16.4 (61.5)	14.7 (58.5)	13.8 (56.8)	13.3 (55.9)	12.7 (54.9)	12.7 (54.9)	13.2 (55.8)	14.2 (57.6)	15.2 (59.4)	14.9 (58.8)
Average precipitation mm (inches)	1.0 (0.04)	1.0 (0.04)	0.0 (0.0)	0.0 (0.0)	1.0 (0.04)	1.0 (0.04)	1.0 (0.04)	1.0 (0.04)	1.0 (0.04)	1.0 (0.04)	0.0 (0.0)	0.0 (0.0)	0.7 (0.03)
Source: climate-data.org

== Gallery ==
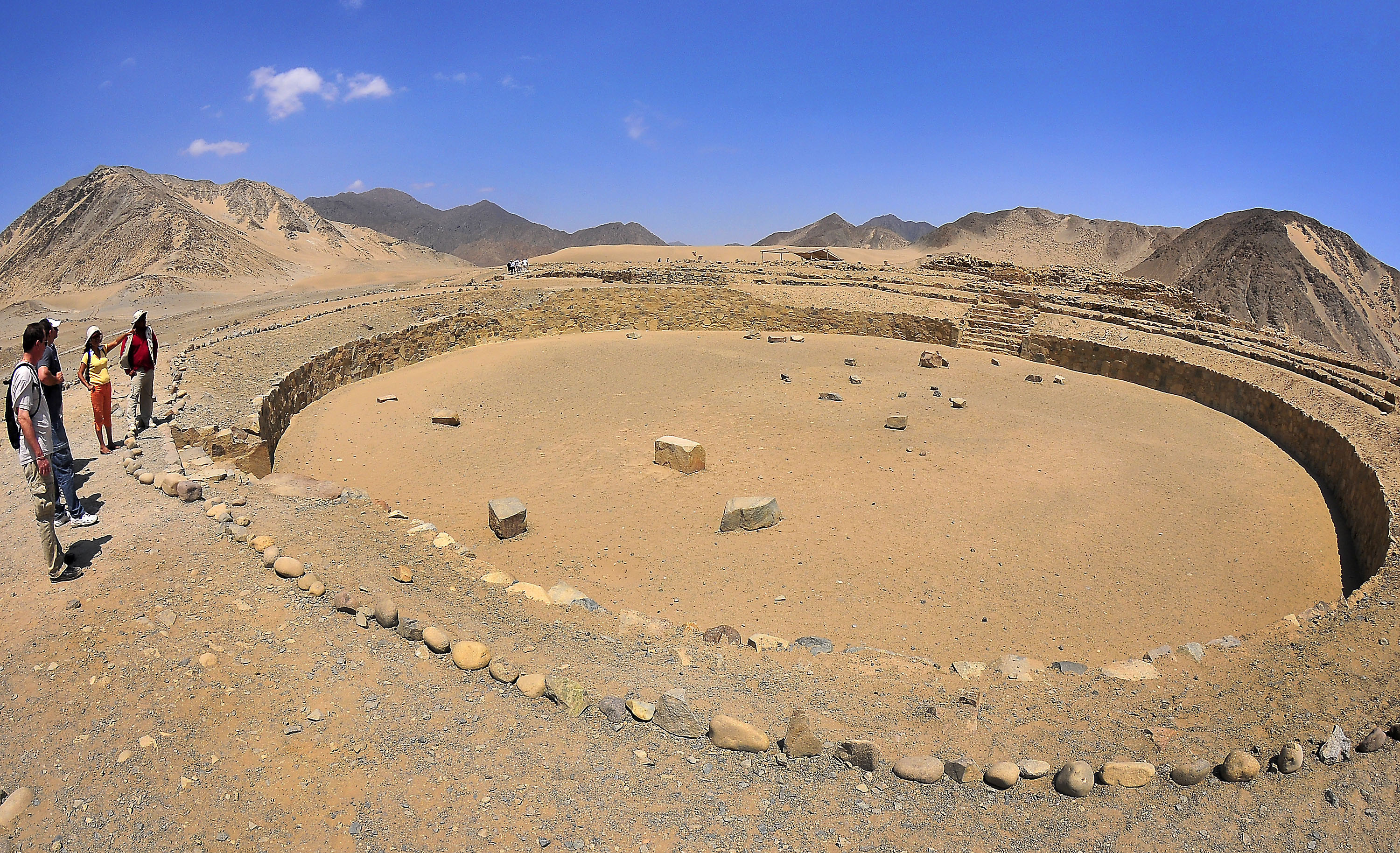

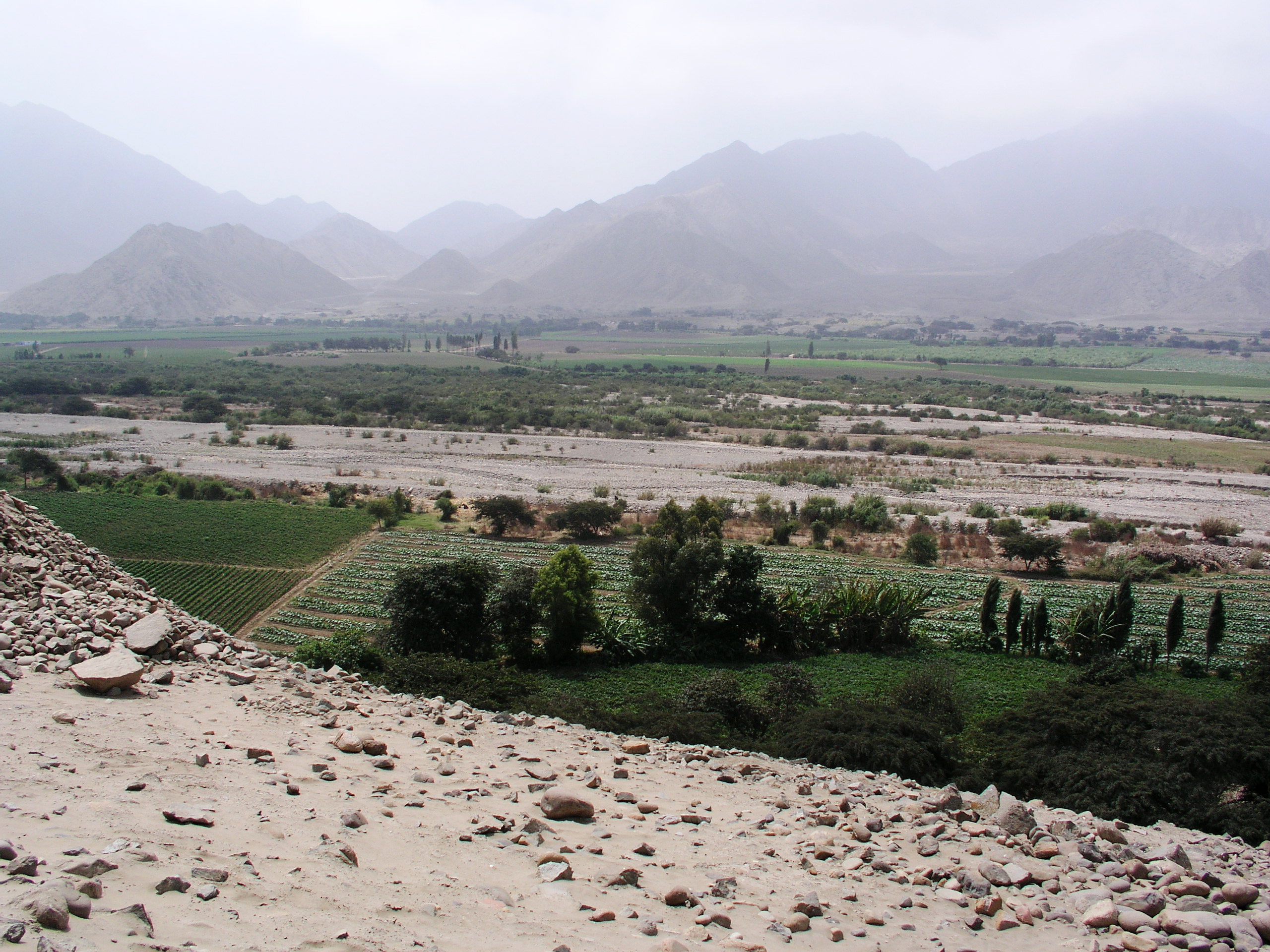

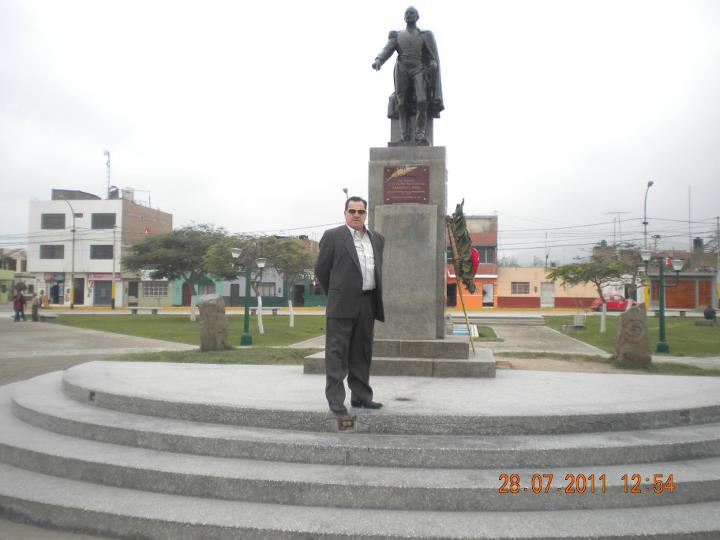
