= Baranca River =

Baranca River may refer to:

- Baranca, a tributary of the Siret in Suceava County, Romania
- Baranca, a tributary of the Herța in Botoșani County, Romania

== See also ==
- Baranca (disambiguation), various villages in Romania
