= Supe District =

- District
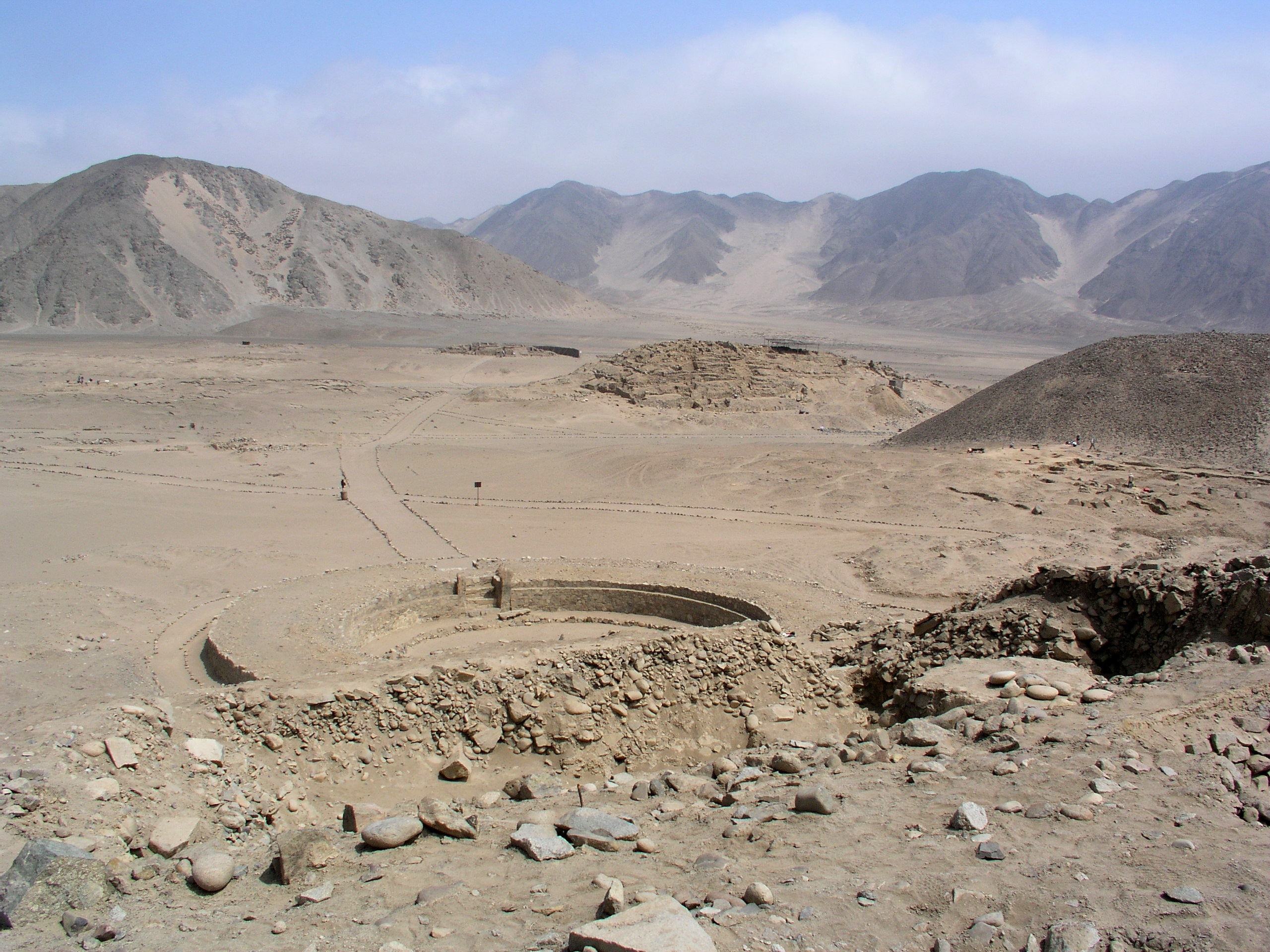

- Location of Supe District in Barranca Province
- Country: Peru
- Region: Lima
- Province: Barranca
- Capital: Supe

Government
  - Mayor: Luis Alberto Sosa Hidalgo

Area
  - Total: 516.28 km^{2} (199.34 sq mi)
- Elevation: 45 m (148 ft)

Population (2017)
  - Total: 24,318
  - Density: 47.102/km^{2} (121.99/sq mi)
- Time zone: UTC-5 (PET)
- UBIGEO: 150204
- Website: www.munisupe.gob.pe

Supe District is one of five districts of the province Barranca in Peru. In Supe there is an archeological "huaca" called Caral.
