= Pativilca District =

Coordinates: 10.6955°S 77.7787°W

Pativilca
- District
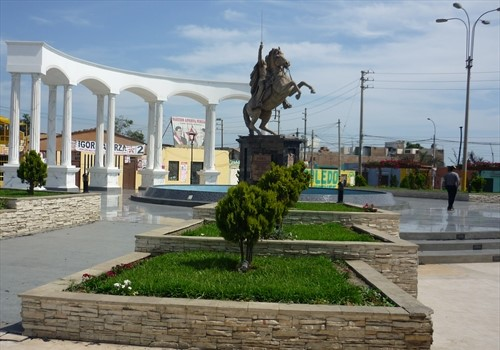

- Coat of arms
- Interactive map of Pativilca
- Country: Peru
- Region: Lima
- Province: Barranca
- Capital: Pativilca

Government
  - Mayor: Cesar Vidal (2019-2022)

Area
  - Total: 260.24 km^{2} (100.48 sq mi)
- Elevation: 81 m (266 ft)

Population (2017)
  - Total: 17,431
  - Density: 66.980/km^{2} (173.48/sq mi)
- Time zone: UTC-5 (PET)
- UBIGEO: 150203
- Website: munipativilca.gob.pe

Pativilca (Spanish pronunciation: [patiˈβilka]) is one of five districts of the province Barranca in Peru.
