= Barranca, Lima =

Peruvian city

Barranca
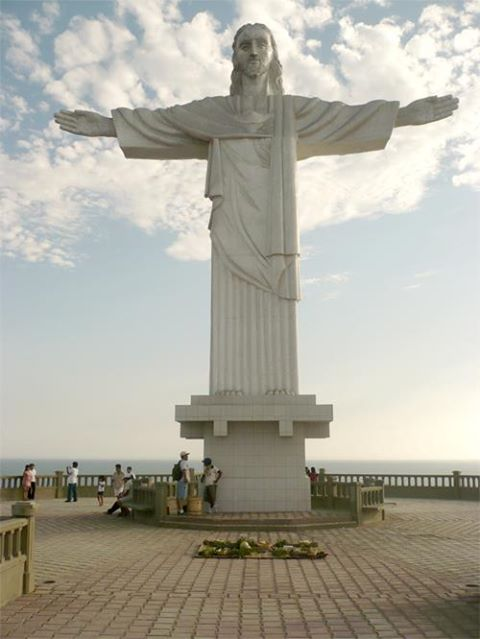
- Christ the Redeemer in Barranca

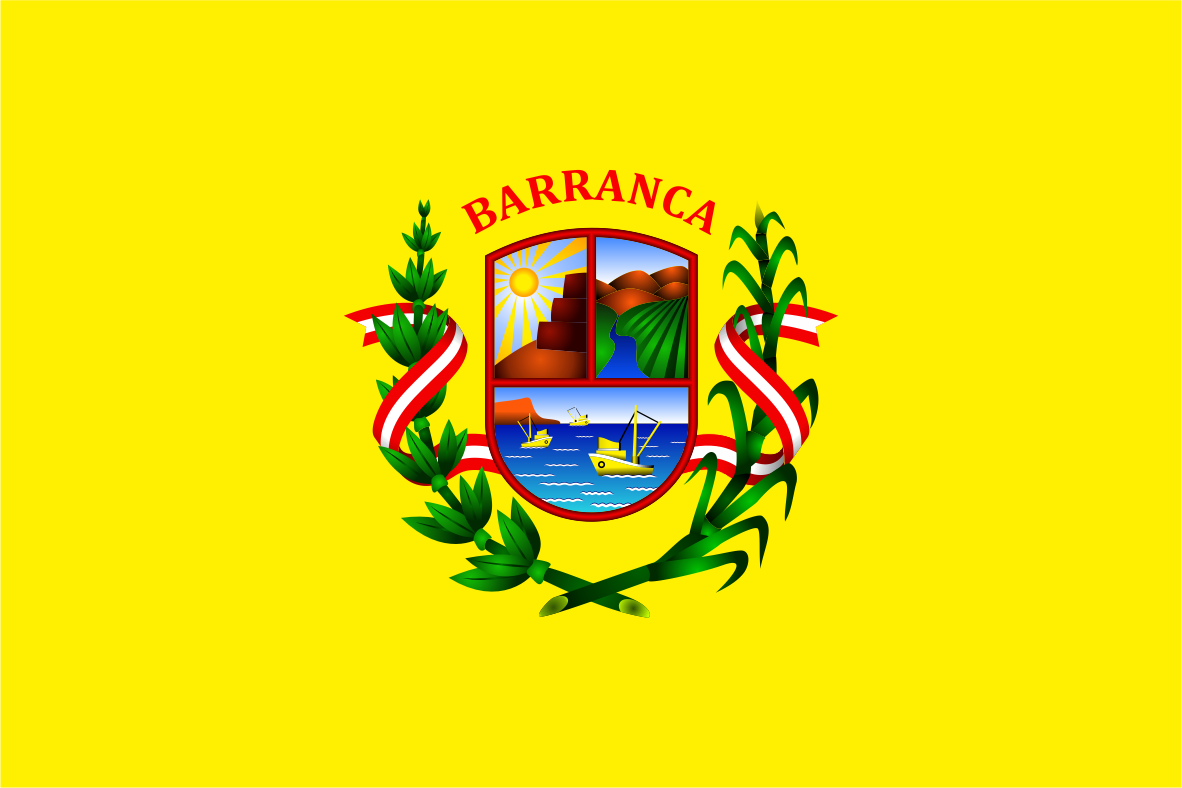
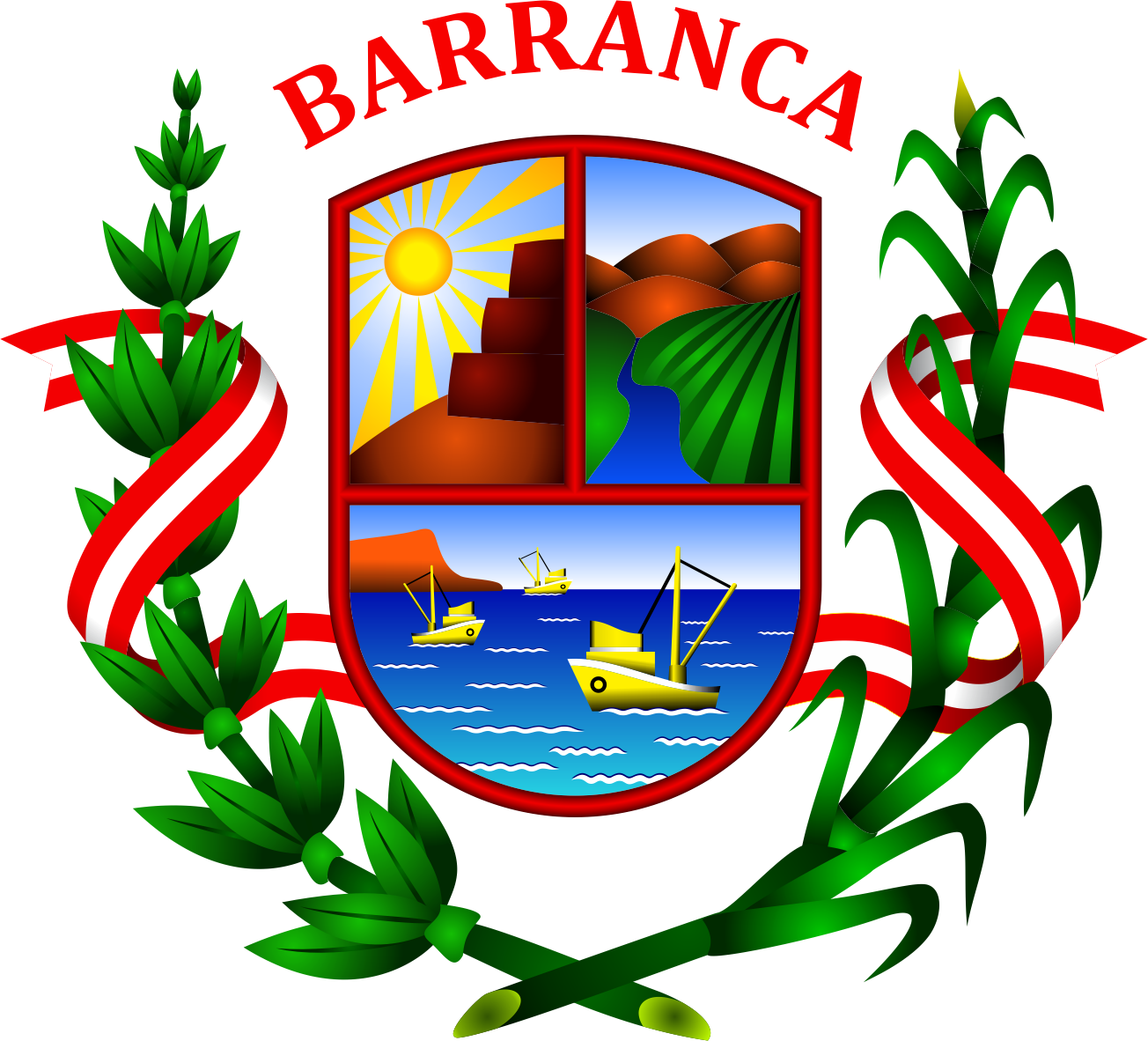
- Flag Seal

- Location within Peru
- Coordinates: 10°45′14.65″S 77°45′39.58″W
- Country: Peru
- Region: Lima
- Province: Barranca
- District: Barranca

Government
  - Mayor: Ricardo Zender (2019-2022)
- Elevation: 49 m (161 ft)

Population
  - Estimate (2017): 58,749
- Time zone: UTC-5 (PET)
- Website: www.munibarranca.gob.pe

Barranca is a city in coastal Peru, capital of the Barranca Province in the Department of Lima.

Historically it started out as a small settlement port made up of local fisherman supplying fish alongside the port of Callao. It is, however, the city it is today mostly from its growth during the Republican era in Peru in the late 1890s to the 1930s.

== Recent discoveries ==
In March 2023, archaeologists from the Jagiellonian University and the National University of San Marcos announced the discovery of the Pre-Columbian temple made of dried bricks with the destroyed human burials near the Barranca. One of the skulls of the male individuals was placed in a 3-meter-long cloth ornamented with zoomorphic representations.

== Climate ==
Climate data for Barranca (Paramonga District) (1991–2020 normals)
Month	Jan	Feb	Mar	Apr	May	Jun	Jul	Aug	Sep	Oct	Nov	Dec	Year
Mean daily maximum °C (°F)	25.7 (78.3)	26.3 (79.3)	25.9 (78.6)	23.8 (74.8)	22.0 (71.6)	20.7 (69.3)	19.8 (67.6)	19.3 (66.7)	19.6 (67.3)	20.6 (69.1)	22.2 (72.0)	23.8 (74.8)	22.5 (72.5)
Mean daily minimum °C (°F)	19.5 (67.1)	20.2 (68.4)	19.8 (67.6)	18.3 (64.9)	17.1 (62.8)	16.2 (61.2)	15.9 (60.6)	15.4 (59.7)	15.4 (59.7)	15.8 (60.4)	16.7 (62.1)	17.9 (64.2)	17.4 (63.2)
Average precipitation mm (inches)	0.1 (0.00)	1.3 (0.05)	0.5 (0.02)	0.0 (0.0)	0.0 (0.0)	0.3 (0.01)	0.4 (0.02)	1.2 (0.05)	0.6 (0.02)	0.0 (0.0)	0.0 (0.0)	0.2 (0.01)	4.6 (0.18)
Source: National Meteorology and Hydrology Service of Peru
