= Pativilca =

- Town
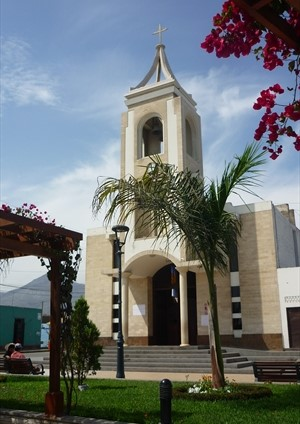
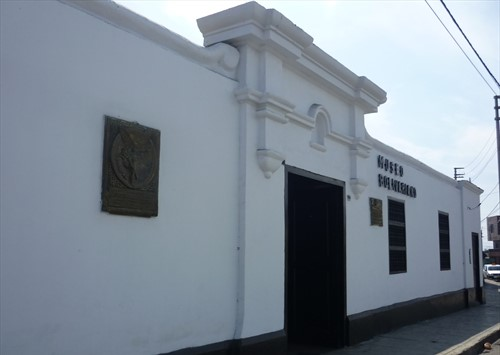
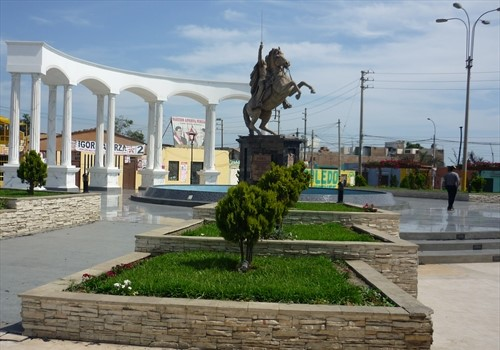

- Location within Peru
- Coordinates: 10°41′45″S 77°46′27″W
- Country: Peru
- Region: Lima
- Province: Barranca
- District: Pativilca

Government
  - Mayor: Cesar Vidal (2019-2022)

Population (2017)
  - Total: 47,827
- Time zone: UTC-5 (PET)
- Website: www.munipativilca.gob.pe

Pativilca is a town in central Peru, capital of the district Pativilca in the province Barranca in the region Lima.
