= Supe Puerto District =

Coordinates: 10.8015°S 77.7435°W

Supe Puerto
- District
- Interactive map of Supe Puerto
- Country: Peru
- Region: Lima
- Province: Barranca
- Founded: December 5, 1906
- Capital: Supe Puerto

Government
  - Mayor: Oscar Moran (2019-2022)

Area
  - Total: 11.51 km^{2} (4.44 sq mi)
- Elevation: 6 m (20 ft)

Population (2017)
  - Total: 12,855
  - Density: 1,117/km^{2} (2,893/sq mi)
- Time zone: UTC-5 (PET)
- UBIGEO: 150205
- Website: www.munisupepuerto.gob.pe

Supe Puerto District is one of five districts of the province Barranca in Peru.
