= Baranca =

Baranca may refer to several villages in Romania:

- Baranca, a village in Cristinești Commune, Botoşani County
- Baranca, a village in Hudeşti Commune, Botoşani County

== See also ==
- Baranca River (disambiguation)
- Barranca (disambiguation)
- Baranga (disambiguation)
