= Barranca District, Barranca =

Coordinates: 10.7525°S 77.7615°W

Barranca
- District
- Interactive map of Barranca
- Country: Peru
- Region: Lima
- Province: Barranca
- Capital: Barranca

Government
  - Mayor: Ricardo Zender (2019-2022)

Area
  - Total: 153.76 km^{2} (59.37 sq mi)
- Elevation: 49 m (161 ft)

Population (2017)
  - Total: 68,324
  - Density: 444.35/km^{2} (1,150.9/sq mi)
- Time zone: UTC-5 (PET)
- UBIGEO: 150201

Barranca District is one of five districts of the province Barranca in Peru.
