= Barranca province =

Province of Peru

Coordinates: 10°40′S 77°43′W

Barranca
- Province
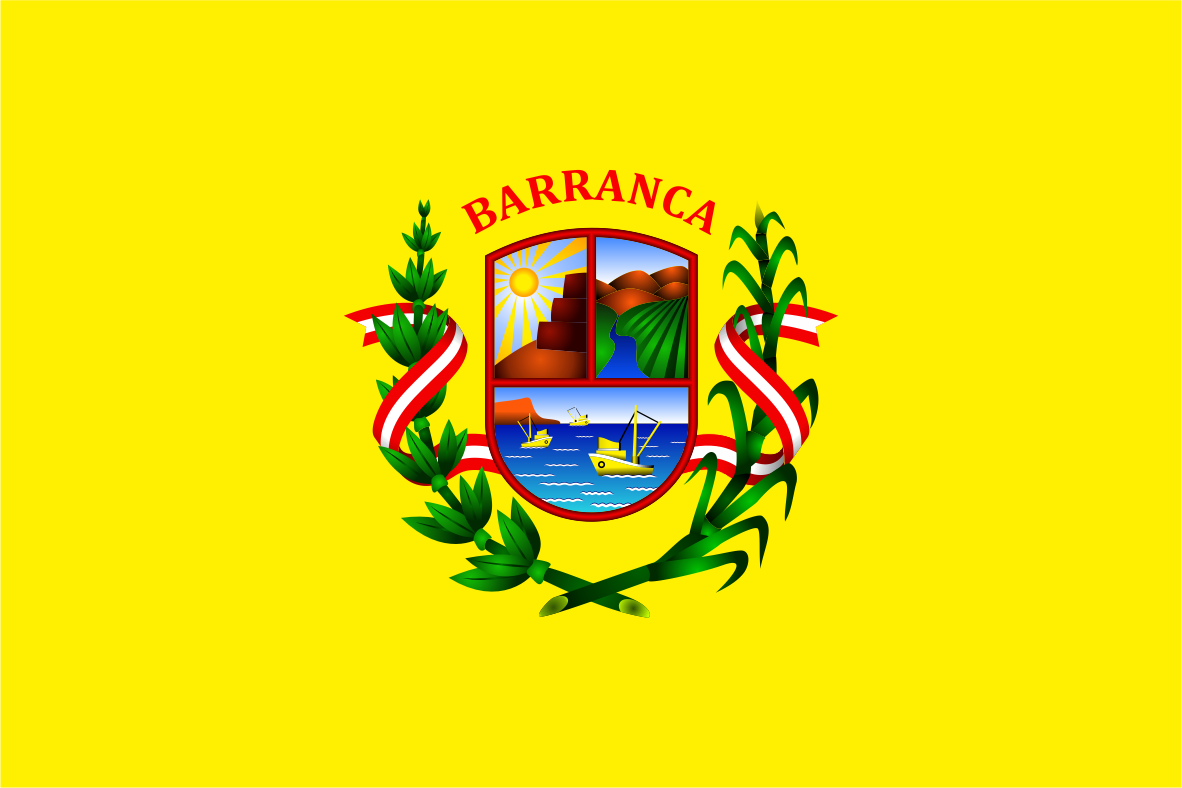
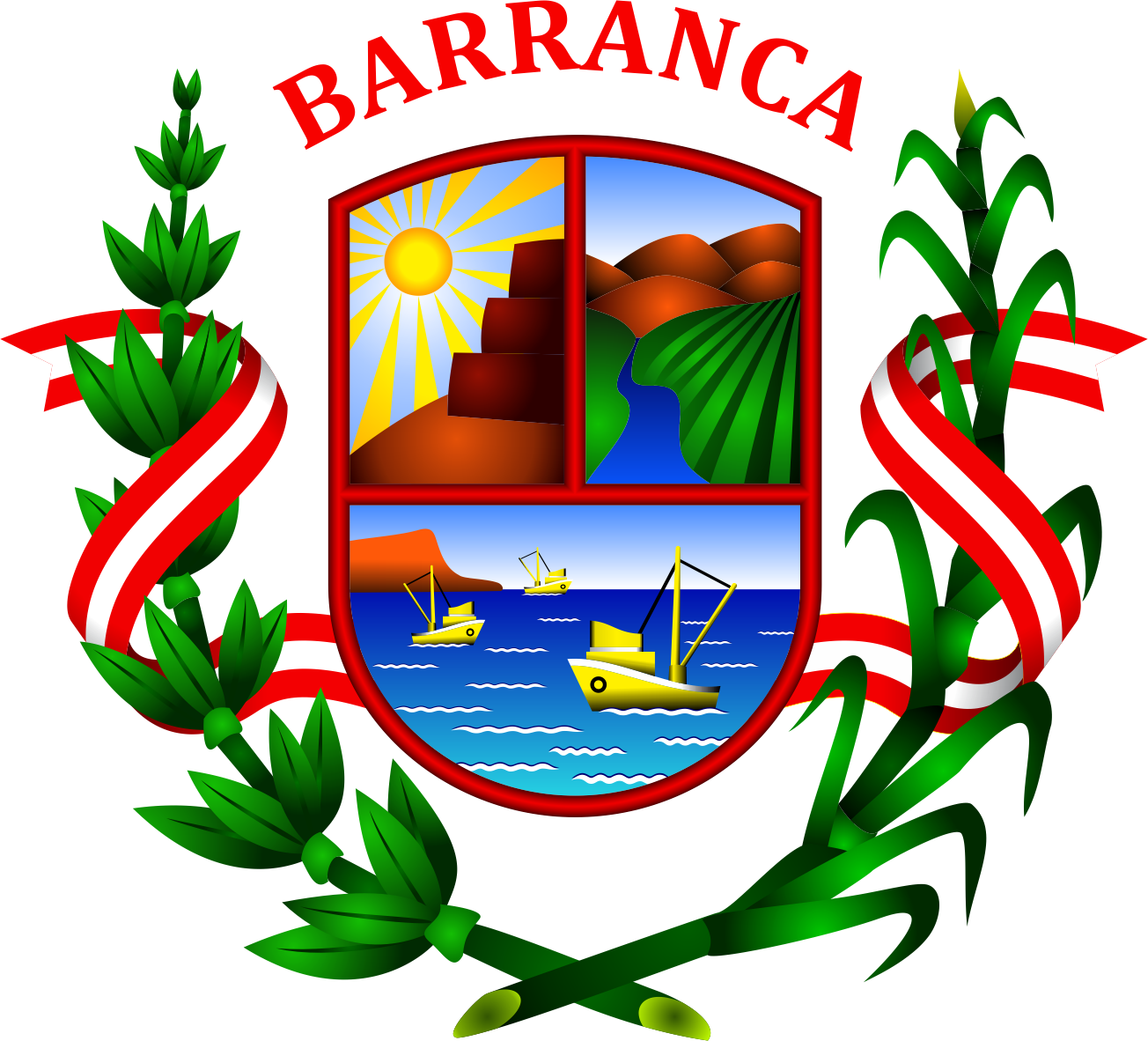
- Flag Coat of arms

- Location of Barranca in Lima
- Country: Peru
- Department: Lima
- Founded: October 5, 1984
- Capital: Barranca

Government
  - Mayor: Luis Emilio Ueno Samanamud

Area
  - Total: 1,355.87 km^{2} (523.50 sq mi)

Population
  - Total: 144,381
  - Density: 106.486/km^{2} (275.797/sq mi)
- UBIGEO: 1502
- Website: www.munibarranca.gob.pe

Barranca (Spanish: [baˈraŋka]) is a province of the department of Lima, Peru. From the administrative point of view of the Catholic Church in Peru, it forms part of the Diocese of Huacho.

== History ==
It was created by Law No. 23939 on October 5, 1984, by the government of President Fernando Belaunde Terry.

== Politics ==
=== Subdivisions ===
The province measures 1,355.87 square kilometres (523.50 sq mi) and is divided into five districts (Spanish: distritos, singular: distrito), each of which is headed by a mayor (alcalde). The districts, with their capitals in parentheses, are:

- Barranca (Barranca)
- Paramonga (Paramonga)
- Pativilca (Pativilca)
- Supe (Supe)
- Supe Puerto (Supe Puerto)

== Geography ==
Geographically, the province has a flat terrain crossed by the valleys of the rivers Fortaleza, Pativilca and Supe.

== See also ==
- Department of Lima
- Provinces of Peru
