= Barrancas metro station =

Santiago metro station

Barrancas
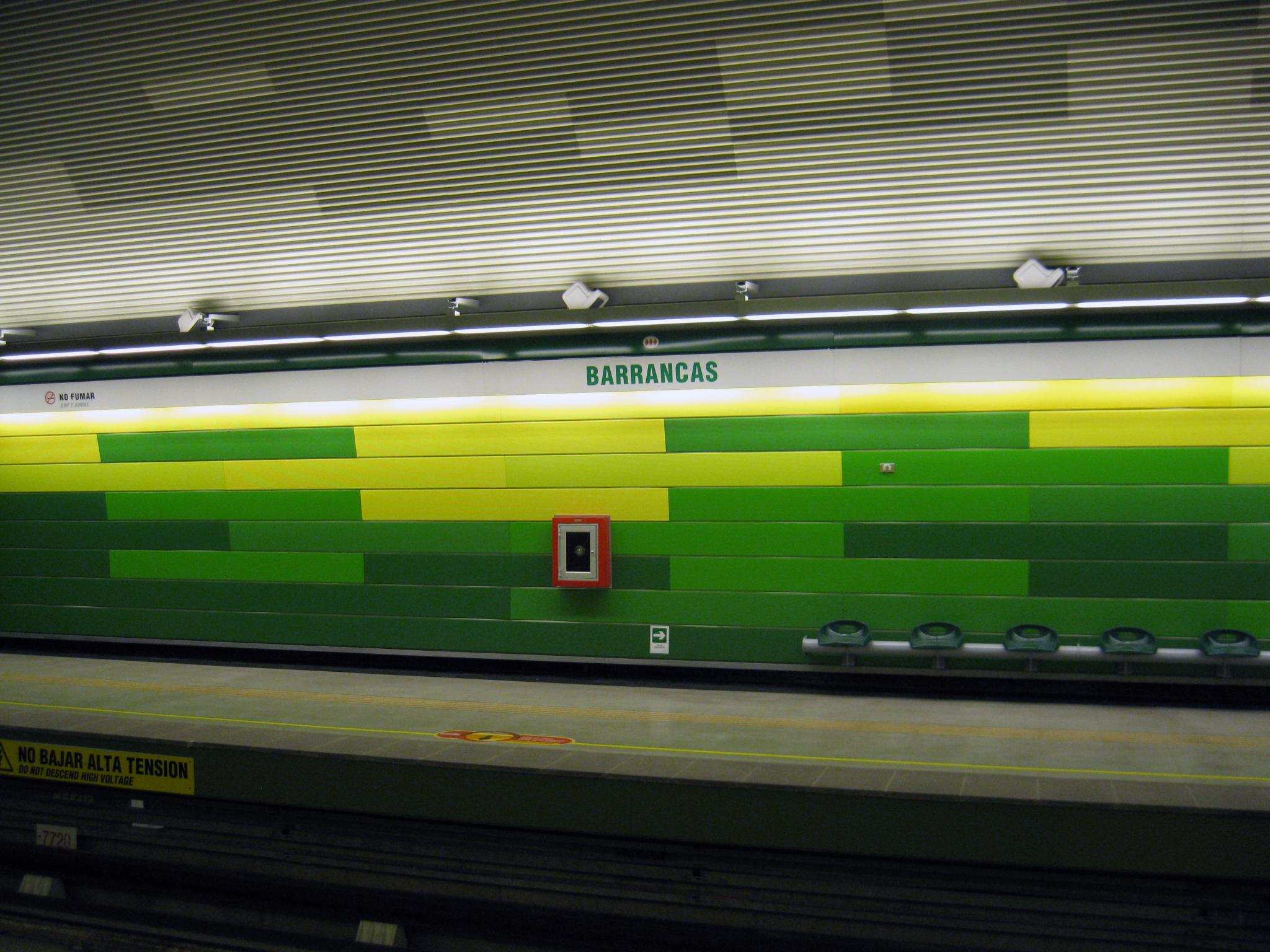
- Platform, Barrancas metro station

General information
- Location: Teniente Cruz Avenue / General Bonilla Avenue
- Coordinates: 33°27′10.48″S 70°44′21.88″W
- System: Santiago rapid transit
- Line: Line 5
- Platforms: 2 side platforms
- Tracks: 2
- Connections: Transantiago buses

Construction
- Accessible: yes

History
- Opened: February 3, 2011

Services
Preceding station	Santiago Metro	Following station
Laguna Sur towards Plaza de Maipú	Line 5	Pudahuel towards Vicente Valdés
Location

Barrancas is an underground metro station on Line 5 of the Santiago Metro network in Santiago, Chile. It is located underneath the junction of Teniente Cruz Avenue and General Bonilla Avenue on the border of the communes of Pudahuel and Lo Prado, between Laguna Sur station (1140 meters away) and Pudahuel station (990 meters away). It also lies parallel to the Route 68 highway which connects Santiago with Valparaíso and Viña del Mar, and the highway crosses over the underground metro line. The station has disabled access.

The station was opened on 3 February 2011 as part of the extension of the line from Pudahuel to Plaza de Maipú.

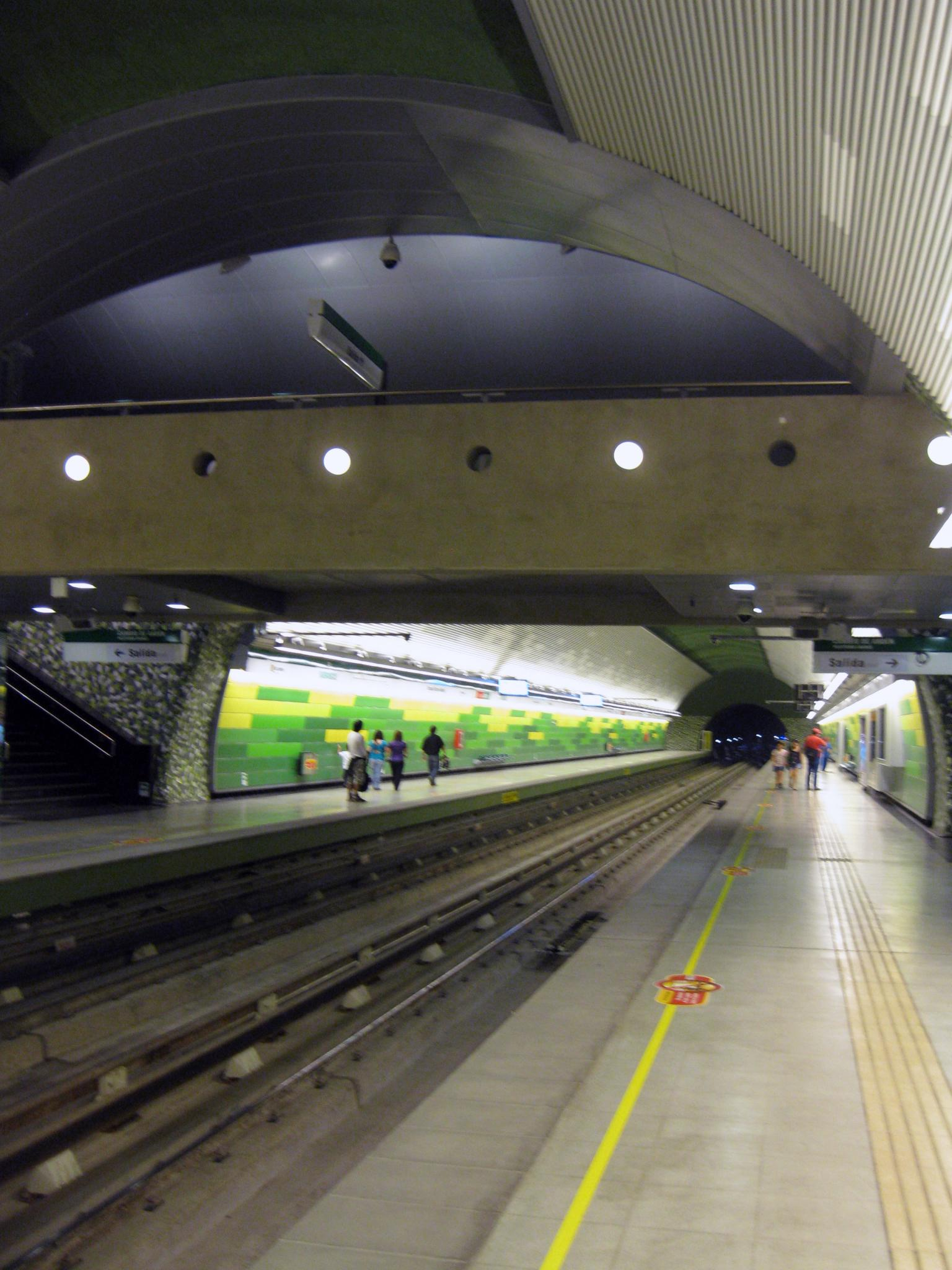
View from the platform

== Etymology ==
The station was named after the old name of this part of the city, Barrancas, which covered the nowadays communes of Pudahuel, Lo Prado, Cerro Navia and Quinta Normal during the 1960s. While the Line 5 extension was being built, Barrancas was known as “General Bonilla” station due to its location on General Bonilla Avenue, itself named after Chilean general Óscar Bonilla.

== History ==
In 2005, the Chilean president Ricardo Lagos announced the extension of Metro Line 5 as far as Maipú. After years of cancelled plans to extend the Metro network to Maipú, the use of Line 5 was unexpected because the Line 1 Metro stations Pajaritos station or Las Rejas station had historically received the bulk of commuters travelling up from Maipú.

Work on the project began in 2006, with the structural work completed in 2010. On October 5, 2010, the first train passed along the tracks of Barrancas station. The station was finally inaugurated on February 3, 2011, along with the other stations between Barrancas and Plaza de Maipú station.
