= César Guardia Mayorga =

Peruvian Quechua writer

- Born: 1906; Huancavelica
- Died: 1983 (aged 76–77); Lima, Peru
- Occupation: Writer
- Writing career
- Language: Quechua, Spanish
- Genres: Poetry, non-fiction

César Guardia Mayorga (Ayacucho, Peru, 1906 -Lima, 1983) was a Peruvian writer, philosopher and university professor. He contributed to Quechua literature with poetry and linguistic studies. He has also written history and philosophy books.

== Life ==
Guardia Mayorga was born in Ayacucho, and then moved with his family to the city of Arequipa. In Arequipa, he attended high school and then studied Philosophy at Universidad Nacional de San Agustin de Arequipa. Later he received his Doctorate and Lawyer degree.

== Legacy ==
In 2020, the researcher Óscar Huamán Águila received the Casa de las Américas Prize for his a thesis on the work of Guardia Mayorga.

== Works ==
- Historia contemporánea, 1937.
- Reconstruyendo el aprismo, 1945.
- Historia de la filosofía griega, 1953.
- La reforma agraria en el Perú, 1957.
- Diccionario kechwa-castellano, 1959.
- De Confucio a Mao tse tung, 1960.
- Runa simi jarawi (poemario en quechua II), 1962.
- Job el creyente y Prometeo el rebelde, 1966.
- Psicología del hombre concreto, 1967.
- Carlos Marx y Federico engels, 1968.
- Gramática kechwa, 1974.
- En el camino, 1978.
- Vida y pasión de Waman Poma de Ayala, 1979.
- Reforma Universitaria, 1949.
- ¿Es possible la existencia de una Filosofía Nacional o Latinoamericana?, 1956.
- Lenin y José Carlos Mariátegui, 1970.
- La Religión en el Tawantinsuyo (inédito).
- Prólogo en "Peruanicemos el Perú" de José Carlos Mariátegui, en 1970
