= Barrancas, Pichilemu =

Coordinates: 34.497°S 71.982°W

Barrancas
- Village
- Barrancas
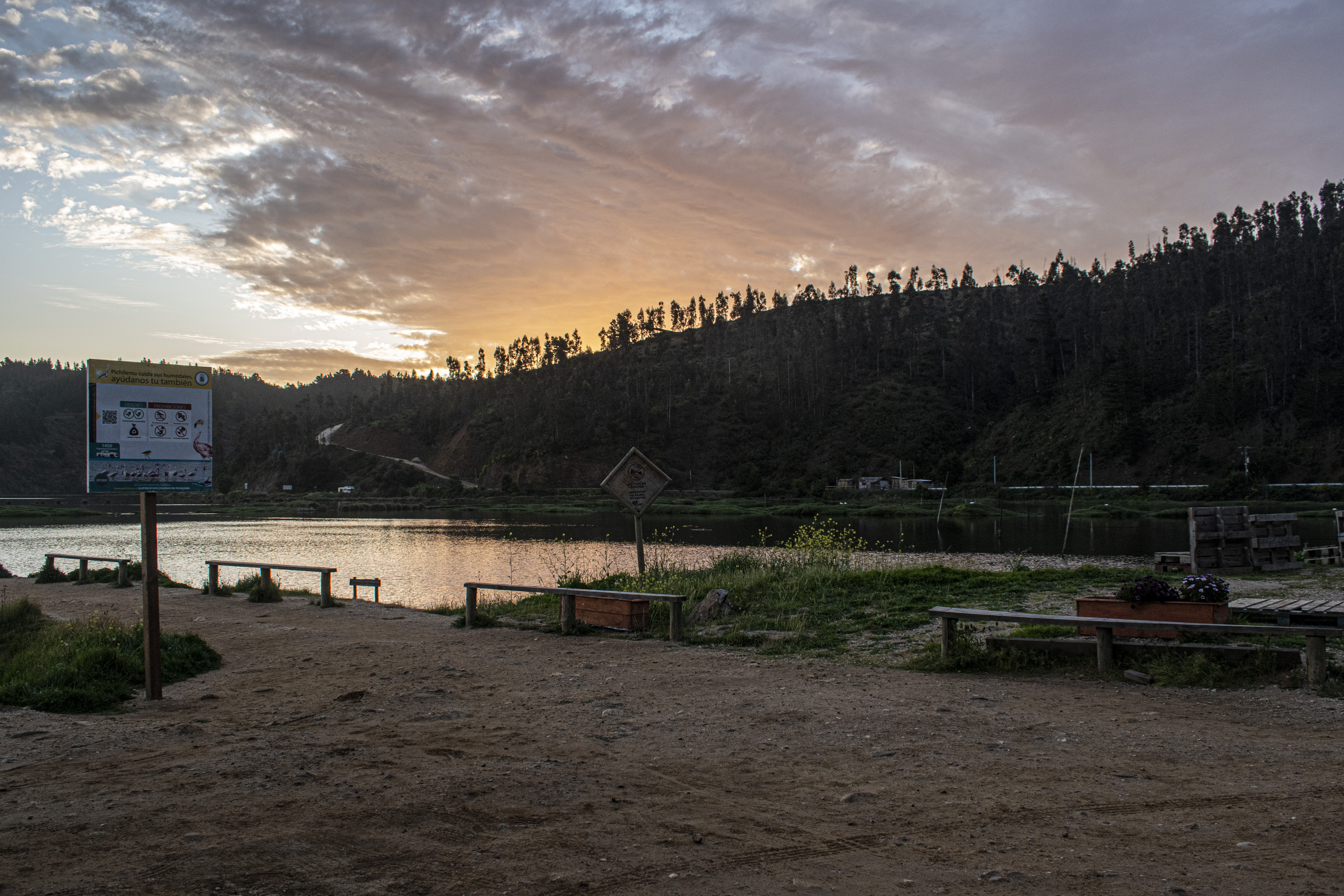
- Interactive map of Barrancas
- Country: Chile
- Region: (O'Higgins Region) O'Higgins
- Province: (Cardenal Caro Province) Cardenal Caro
- Commune: Pichilemu

Barrancas (Spanish for canyons, pronounced [baˈraŋkas]) is a Chilean village located in Pichilemu, Cardenal Caro Province.
