= Paramonga District =

Coordinates: 10°40′0″S 77°50′0″W

Paramonga
- District
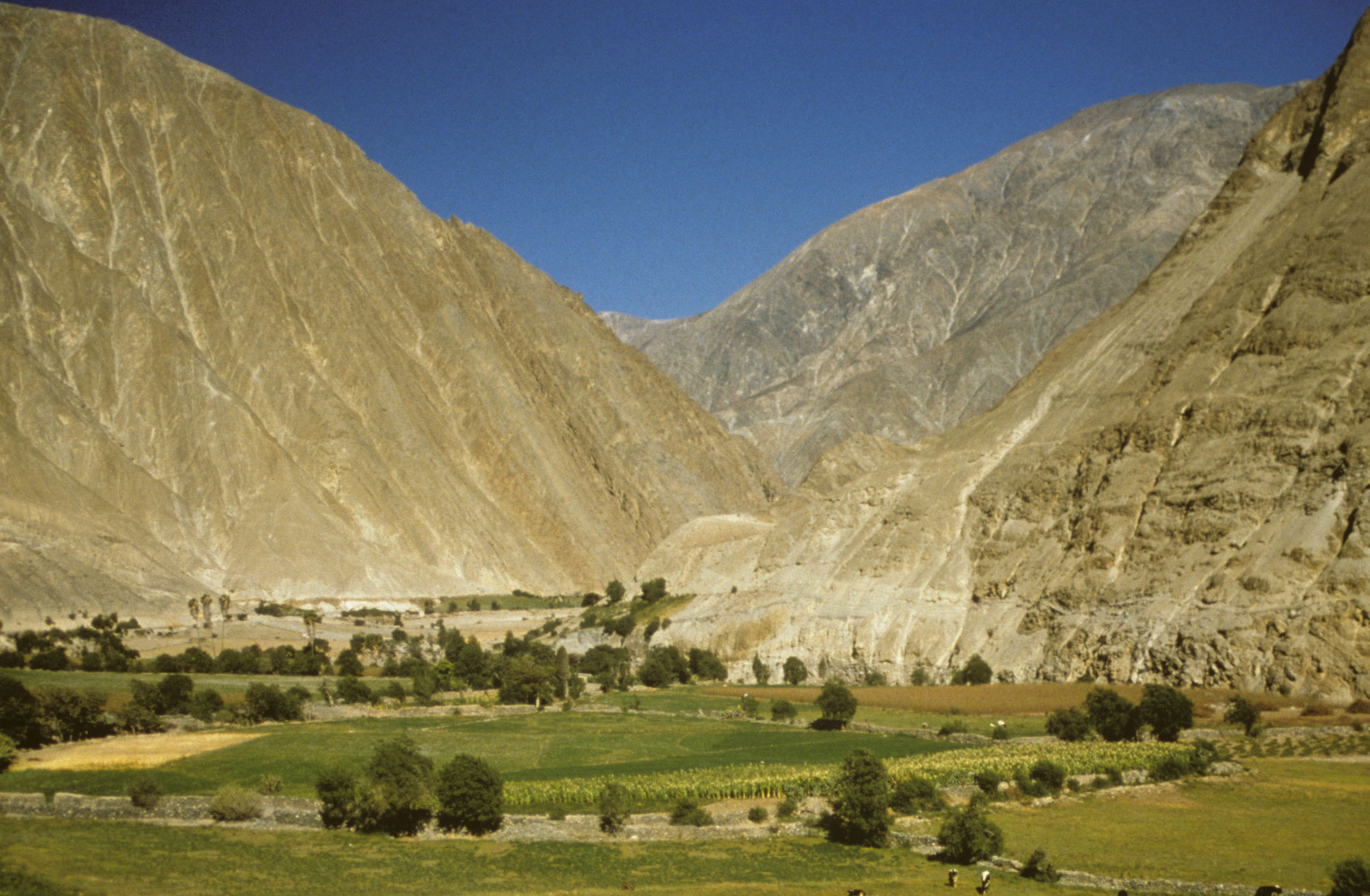

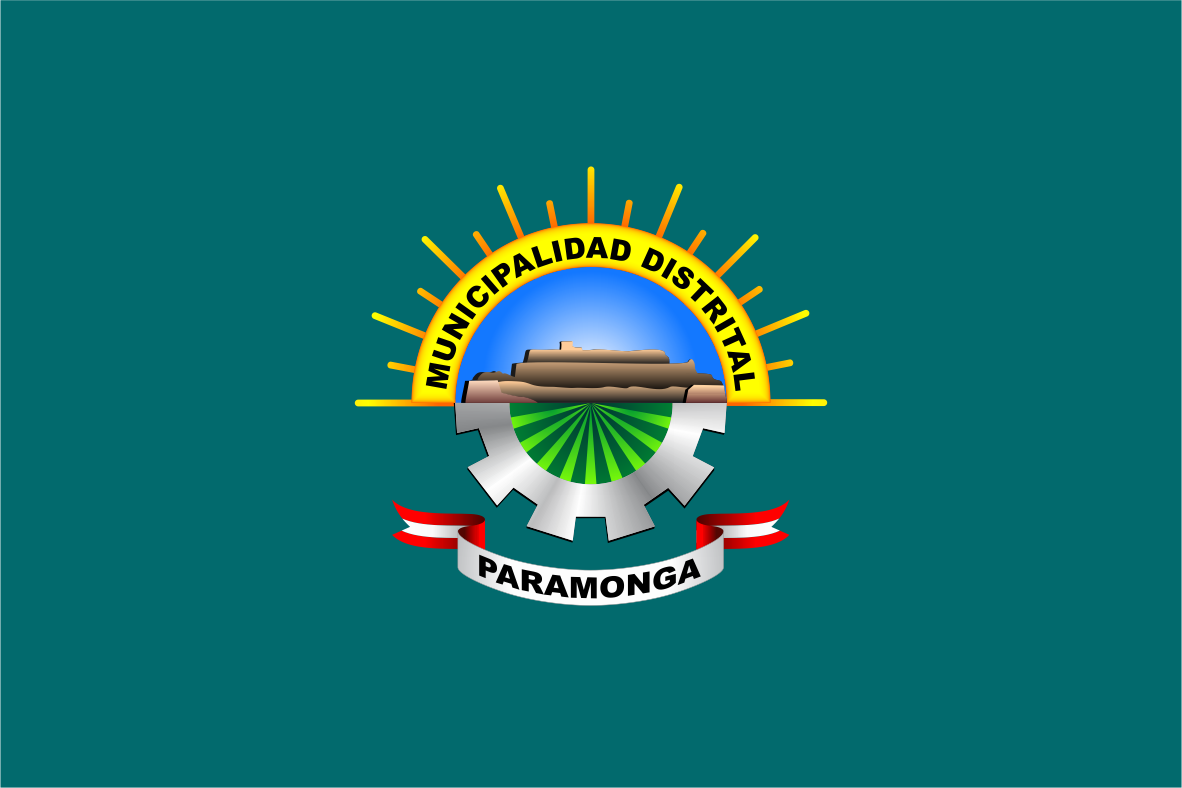
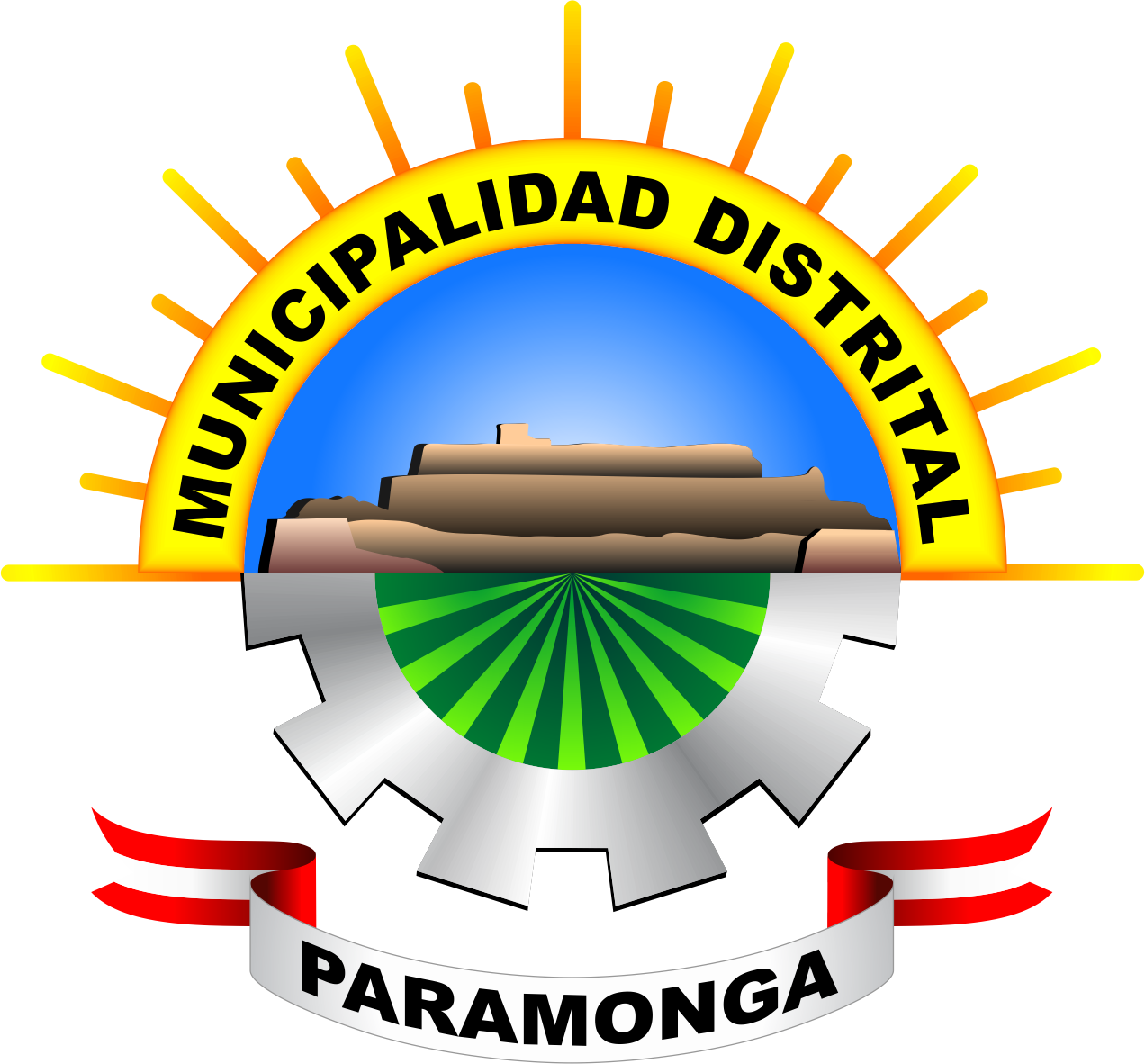
- Flag Coat of arms

- Location of Paramonga in the Barranca Province
- Country: Peru
- Region: Lima
- Province: Barranca
- Founded: November 23, 1976
- Capital: Paramonga

Government
  - Mayor: Luis Eduardo Arrestegui (2023-present)

Area
  - Total: 414.08 km^{2} (159.88 sq mi)
- Elevation: 13 m (43 ft)

Population (2017)
  - Total: 21,453
  - Density: 51.809/km^{2} (134.18/sq mi)
- Time zone: UTC-5 (PET)
- UBIGEO: 150202
- Website: muniparamonga.gob.pe

Paramonga District is one of five districts of the province Barranca in Peru.

It is, in the history of Peru, the first agroindustrial district due to the existence of factories dedicated to the production of sugarcane derivatives.
